= List of electoral divisions in West Sussex 2009 =

This is a list of all the electoral divisions in the non-metropolitan county of West Sussex.

These are new electoral divisions as recommended by the Boundary Committee for England following a review, carried out at the request of West Sussex County Council. The new divisions of 71 single-member wards replaced the 70 seats that were contested across 62 divisions in 2005. The recommendations were accepted by the Electoral Commission in February 2009, who implemented the legal order authorising the change on 6 March 2009, allowing the new divisions to be used for the first time in the 4 June 2009 local elections .

== Electoral divisions ==
- Angmering & Findon
- Arundel & Wick
- Bersted
- Bewbush & Ifield West
- Billingshurst
- Bognor Regis East
- Bognor Regis West & Aldwick
- Bourne
- Bramber Castle
- Broadfield
- Broadwater
- Burgess Hill East
- Burgess Hill Town
- Chichester East
- Chichester North
- Chichester South
- Chichester West
- Cissbury
- Cuckfield & Lucastes
- Durrington & Salvington
- East Grinstead Meridian
- East Grinstead South & Ashurst Wood
- East Preston & Ferring
- Felpham
- Fernhurst
- Fontwell
- Goring
- Gossops Green & Ifield East
- Hassocks & Victoria
- Haywards Heath East
- Haywards Heath Town
- Henfield
- Holbrook
- Horsham Hurst
- Horsham Riverside
- Horsham Tanbridge & Broadbridge Heath
- Hurstpierpoint & Bolney
- Imberdown
- Kingston Buci
- Lancing
- Langley Green & West Green
- Lindfield & High Weald
- Littlehampton East
- Littlehampton Town
- Maidenbower
- Middleton
- Midhurst
- Northbrook
- Northgate & Three Bridges
- Nyetimber
- Petworth
- Pound Hill & Worth
- Pulborough
- Roffey
- Rustington
- Saltings
- Selsey
- Shoreham
- Sompting & North Lancing
- Southgate & Crawley Central
- Southwater & Nuthurst
- Southwick
- Storrington
- Tarring
- Tilgate & Furnace Green
- Warnham & Rusper
- Witterings, The
- Worth Forest
- Worthing East
- Worthing Pier
- Worthing West
