= 2009 West Sussex County Council election =

2009 UK local government election

- 4 June 2009

All 71 seats to West Sussex County Council 36 seats needed for a majority
	First party	Second party	Third party
Party	Conservative	Liberal Democrats	Labour
Seats won	48	21	2
Seat change	▲2	▲4	▼5
- Map showing the results of the 2009 West Sussex County Council elections.
Council control before election
Conservative
Council control after election
Conservative

The West Sussex County Council election, 2009 were elections to West Sussex County Council which took place on 4 June 2009, having been delayed from 7 May, in order to coincide with elections to the European Parliament.

The elections saw the Conservative Party retain overall control, having done so since 1997. On this occasion they gained two seats and saw their vote share increase by just over 5%. The Liberal Democrats strengthened their position as the main opposition party, gaining a net total of four seats, despite their own share of the vote falling by nearly 4%. The Labour Party lost five of the seven seats they had held before the election, and saw their vote fall by nearly 10%, broadly in line with their national decline. This decline saw the party fall to fourth place in the county in terms of the popular vote, being replaced in third by the UK Independence Party, who are likely to have benefited by voting being held alongside the European Parliament elections.

== Summary ==
West Sussex County Council election, 2009
Party	Seats	Gains	Losses	Net gain/loss	Seats %	Votes %	Votes	+/−
Conservative	48	8	6	+2	67.61	48.40	114,088	+5.23%
Liberal Democrats	21	7 (Note: Includes Horsham, Tanbridge and Broadbridge Heath, a new seat created as a result of a long public consultation held by the Local Government Boundary Commission for England, triggered by a level of natural malapportionment due to the variance in electorate threshold reached in at least 30% of wards.)	3	+4	29.58	28.96	68,262	-3.76%
UKIP	0	0	0	0	0.00	8.55	20,152	+5.57%
Labour	2	0	5	-5	2.82	8.48	19,982	-9.28%
Green	0	0	0	0	0.00	2.21	5,212	-0.07%
BNP	0	0	0	0	0.00	2.01	4,742	+1.81%
Independent	0	0	0	0	0.00	0.66	1,553	-0.18%
English Democrat	0	0	0	0	0.00	0.61	1,446	N/A
Peace	0	0	0	0	0.00	0.07	159	N/A
Justice	0	0	0	0	0.00	0.05	121	N/A

== Results by division ==
The elections were the first to be fought on new electoral divisions as recommended by the Boundary Committee for England following a review, carried out at the request of West Sussex County Council. The new arrangement of 71 single-member divisions replaced the 70 seats that were contested across 62 divisions in 2005. The recommendations were accepted by the Electoral Commission in February 2009, who implemented the legal order authorising the change and allowing the new divisions to be used in these elections on 6 March 2009.

=== Adur ===
Kingston Buci
Party	Candidate	Votes	%	±%
Conservative	Paul Graysmark	1,198	45.8	+8.9
UKIP	Michael Henn	554	21.2	+15.6
Labour	Andrew Bray	452	17.3	−11.7
Liberal Democrats	Patricia Izod	409	15.7	−7.8
Majority		644	24.6	+16.7
Turnout		2,613	35.1	−26.8
Conservative hold		Swing		

Lancing
Party	Candidate	Votes	%	±%
Conservative	Angela Mills	880	34.4	−3.0
Liberal Democrats	Stephen Martin	753	29.4	−1.2
UKIP	David Bushell	710	27.8	+20.8
Labour	David Devoy	215	8.4	−16.6
Majority		127	5.0	−1.8
Turnout		2,558	31.6	−27.9
Conservative hold		Swing		

Saltings
Party	Candidate	Votes	%	±%
Conservative	Robert Dunn	1,154	38.1	−5.2
UKIP	Mike Mendoza	781	25.8	+21.1
Liberal Democrats	Doris Martin	458	15.1	−13.2
Green	Stephen Barnes	365	12.1	N/A
Labour	Agnes Daniel	269	8.9	−14.8
Majority		373	12.3	−2.7
Turnout		3,027	37.2	−26.2
Conservative hold		Swing		

Shoreham
Party	Candidate	Votes	%	±%
Conservative	Brian Coomber	1,453	49.1	+2.0
Green	Moyra Martin	483	16.3	+7.7
UKIP	Brian Elliott	396	13.4	+9.4
Liberal Democrats	Cyril Cannings	370	12.5	−8.6
Labour	Richard Daniel	256	8.7	−10.6
Majority		970	32.8	+6.8
Turnout		2,958	39.8	−30.2
Conservative hold		Swing		

Sompting & North Lancing
Party	Candidate	Votes	%	±%
Conservative	David Simmons	1,376	45.3	+5.3
UKIP	Reuben Whiting	747	24.6	N/A
Liberal Democrats	Richard Burt	546	18.0	−12.1
Labour	Barry Mear	370	12.2	−17.8
Majority		629	20.7	+10.8
Turnout		3,039	35.3	−25.8
Conservative hold		Swing		

Southwick
Party	Candidate	Votes	%	±%
Conservative	Janet Mockridge	1,089	42.6	+2.5
UKIP	Jennifer Greig	593	23.2	+16.7
Liberal Democrats	John Hilditch	359	14.0	−5.5
Labour	Barry Thompson	273	10.7	−18.3
Green	Susan Board	245	9.6	+4.6
Majority		496	19.4	+8.3
Turnout		2,559	33.1	−30.9
Conservative hold		Swing		

=== Arun ===
Angmering & Findon
Party	Candidate	Votes	%	±%
Conservative	Deborah Urquhart	2,083	66.6	+16.4
Liberal Democrats	Trevor Richards	1,043	33.4	−4.4
Majority		1,040	33.2	+20.8
Turnout		3,126	39.7	−27.1
Conservative hold		Swing		

Arundel & Wick
Party	Candidate	Votes	%	±%
Conservative	Nigel Peters	1,648	56.2	+18.7
Liberal Democrats	Nicholas Wiltshire	1,009	34.4	+7.1
Labour	Alan Butcher	274	9.3	−17.0
Majority		639	21.8	+11.6
Turnout		2,931	38.2	−26.7
Conservative hold		Swing		

Bersted
Party	Candidate	Votes	%	±%
Liberal Democrats	Simon McDougall	992	33.2	+2.8
Conservative	Ann Smee	873	29.2	+0.3
UKIP	Ann Rapnik	511	17.1	+6.3
Labour	Simon Holland	326	10.9	−19.1
BNP	Michael Witchell	285	9.5	N/A
Majority		119	4.0	+3.6
Turnout		2,987	34.1	−24.8
Liberal Democrats hold		Swing		

Bognor Regis East
Party	Candidate	Votes	%	±%
Liberal Democrats	Francis Oppler	1,279	45.9	+13.9
Conservative	Philip Hitchins	711	25.5	+3.5
UKIP	Philip Lee	517	18.6	+9.0
BNP	Albert Bodle	278	10.0	N/A
Majority		568	20.4	+17.9
Turnout		2,785	29.9	−25.3
Liberal Democrats hold		Swing		

Bognor Regis West & Aldwick
Party	Candidate	Votes	%	±%
Liberal Democrats	Paul Wells	1,606	44.3	+4.8
Conservative	Robin Brown	1,545	42.8	−3.3
BNP	David Little	264	7.3	N/A
Labour	Jan Cosgrave	214	5.9	N/A
Majority		61	1.5	
Turnout		3,629	40.1	−21.8
Liberal Democrats gain from Conservative		Swing		

East Preston & Ferring
Party	Candidate	Votes	%	±%
Conservative	Peter Evans	2,956	66.0	+8.8
Liberal Democrats	Christine Brown	649	14.5	−7.7
English Democrat	Clive Maltby	482	10.8	N/A
Labour	Henry Miller	390	8.7	−6.7
Majority		2,307	51.5	+16.5
Turnout		4,477	45.9	−23.9
Conservative hold		Swing		

Felpham
Party	Candidate	Votes	%	±%
Conservative	George Blampied	1,676	54.5	+9.3
UKIP	Alicia Denny	734	23.9	+14.7
Liberal Democrats	Jason Passingham	474	15.4	−16.3
Labour	Michelle White	191	6.2	−7.7
Majority		942	30.6	+17.1
Turnout		3,075	39.3	−29.2
Conservative hold		Swing		

Fontwell
Party	Candidate	Votes	%	±%
Conservative	Derek Whttington	2,310	64.3	+14.4
Liberal Democrats	George Fletcher	1,281	35.7	−1.3
Majority		1,029	28.6	+15.7
Turnout		3,591	39.9	−25.6
Conservative hold		Swing		

Littlehampton East
Party	Candidate	Votes	%	±%
Liberal Democrats	James Walsh	1,525	45.1	+8.0
Conservative	Joyce Bowyer	1,007	29.8	−2.2
UKIP	Robert East	553	16.3	+7.2
Labour	Stephen McConnell	179	5.3	−16.4
BNP	James Baxter	120	3.5	N/A
Majority		518	13.5	+8.4
Turnout		3,384	38.0	−24.3
Liberal Democrats hold		Swing		

Littlehampton Town
Party	Candidate	Votes	%	±%
Conservative	David Britton	757	28.7	+1.8
Liberal Democrats	Ian Buckland	689	26.1	+2.1
Labour	George O'Neill	568	21.5	−15.6
UKIP	Derek Pescud	476	18.0	+6.0
BNP	Valerie Manchee	149	5.6	N/A
Majority		68	2.6	
Turnout		2,639	32.3	−21.2
Conservative gain from Labour		Swing		

Middleton
Party	Candidate	Votes	%	±%
Conservative	Christina Freeman	1,640	49.9	−0.9
UKIP	Joan Phillips	906	27.5	+18.6
Liberal Democrats	David Bliss	531	16.1	−6.8
Labour	Edward Nattrass	212	6.4	−12.8
Majority		734	22.4	−3.7
Turnout		3,289	39.2	−24.4
Conservative hold		Swing		

Nyetimber
Party	Candidate	Votes	%	±%
Conservative	Michael Coleman	1,791	47.7	0.0
UKIP	Douglas Denny	924	24.6	+15.1
Liberal Democrats	Gregory Burt	544	14.5	−6.7
Labour	Pauline Nash	247	6.6	−14.9
BNP	Paul Cole	245	6.5	N/A
Majority		867	23.1	−3.1
Turnout		3,751	41.2	−26.9
Conservative hold		Swing		

Rustington
Party	Candidate	Votes	%	±%
Conservative	Graham Tyler	2,962	69.6	+23.5
Liberal Democrats	John Lovell	986	23.2	−9.0
Labour	Anthony Dines	310	7.3	−7.5
Majority		1,976	46.4	+32.6
Turnout		4,258	45.1	−22.9
Conservative hold		Swing		

=== Chichester ===
Bourne
Party	Candidate	Votes	%	±%
Conservative	Thomas Dunn	1,948	56.3	+15.7
Liberal Democrats	Philip MacDougall	1,382	40.0	+7.2
Labour	Janet Miller	127	3.7	−10.6
Majority		566	16.3	+8.6
Turnout		3,457	37.1	−28.5
Conservative hold		Swing		

Chichester East
Party	Candidate	Votes	%	±%
Liberal Democrats	Andrew Smith	1,717	52.3	+11.5
Conservative	Norman Dingemans	1,168	35.6	+2.7
BNP	Ray Fallick	203	6.2	N/A
Labour	June Leonard	196	6.0	−13.5
Majority		549	16.7	+8.8
Turnout		3,284	34.5	−24.7
Liberal Democrats hold		Swing		

Chichester North
Party	Candidate	Votes	%	±%
Conservative	Michael Hall	1,901	52.4	+17.5
Liberal Democrats	Richard Plowman	1,118	30.8	−17.9
UKIP	Michael Mason	439	12.1	+6.7
Labour	Margaret Dyer	168	4.6	−6.4
Majority		783	21.6	
Turnout		3,626	44.0	−24.4
Conservative gain from Liberal Democrats		Swing		

Chichester South
Party	Candidate	Votes	%	±%
Conservative	Elizabeth Whitehead	1,419	42.9	+6.2
Liberal Democrats	Alan Chaplin	1,068	32.3	−8.2
UKIP	Nigel Sitwell	581	17.6	+10.9
Labour	Wendy Pengelly	241	7.3	−8.8
Majority		351	10.6	
Turnout		3,309	36.7	−28.6
Conservative gain from Liberal Democrats		Swing		

Chichester West
Party	Candidate	Votes	%	±%
Conservative	Mary-Louise Goldsmith	2,190	55.0	+15.6
Liberal Democrats	Alix Henry	692	17.4	−15.6
UKIP	James McCulloch	380	9.5	+3.6
Green	Richard Lanchester	378	9.5	N/A
Labour	John Bennett	199	5.0	−9.1
BNP	Andrew Emerson	142	3.6	N/A
Majority		1,498	37.6	+31.2
Turnout		3,981	43.0	−22.3
Conservative hold		Swing		

Fernhurst
Party	Candidate	Votes	%	±%
Conservative	Michael Brown	1,995	54.9	+2.6
Liberal Democrats	Matthew Bonfante-Horrox	825	22.7	−9.3
UKIP	Andrew Moncrieff	644	17.7	+12.6
Labour	John Smith	169	4.7	−6.0
Majority		1,170	32.2	+11.9
Turnout		3,633	42.9	−27.6
Conservative hold		Swing		

Midhurst
Party	Candidate	Votes	%	±%
Conservative	Nola Hendon	2,479	68.4	+29.9
Liberal Democrats	Judith Fowler	952	26.3	−1.7
Labour	Andrew Young	195	5.4	N/A
Majority		1,527	42.1	+32.3
Turnout		3,626	41.3	−26.8
Conservative hold		Swing		

Petworth
Party	Candidate	Votes	%	±%
Conservative	Christopher Duncton	2,769	70.3	+16.1
Liberal Democrats	Raymond Cooper	810	20.6	−9.7
BNP	Robert Trower	209	5.3	N/A
Labour	Brenda Wise	148	3.8	−6.2
Majority		1,959	49.7	+25.8
Turnout		3,939	41.1	−28.6
Conservative hold		Swing		

Selsey
Party	Candidate	Votes	%	±%
Conservative	Peter Jones	1,525	47.1	+6.9
UKIP	Bernard Smith	1,295	40.0	+28.7
Labour	Ian Bell	415	12.8	−9.8
Majority		230	7.1	−7.2
Turnout		3,235	36.6	−28.0
Conservative hold		Swing		

The Witterings
Party	Candidate	Votes	%	±%
Conservative	Justus Montyn	1,627	49.6	+4.3
Independent	John Daws-Chew	618	18.8	+18.8
Liberal Democrats	Roger Tilbury	346	10.6	−8.6
Green	Adrian Mills	292	8.9	N/A
BNP	Sylvia Trower	220	6.7	N/A
Labour	Patrick O'Sullivan	176	5.4	−6.8
Majority		1,009	30.8	+4.7
Turnout		3,279	40.1	−26.2
Conservative hold		Swing		

=== Crawley ===
Bewbush & Ifield West
Party	Candidate	Votes	%	±%
Labour	Christopher Oxlade	865	36.0	
Conservative	Adam Brown	758	31.5	
Liberal Democrats	Edward Arnold	344	14.3	
BNP	George Baldwin	315	13.1	
Justice	Arshad Khan	121	5.0	
Majority		107	4.5	
Turnout		2,403	28.5	
Labour win (new seat)				

Broadfield
Party	Candidate	Votes	%	±%
Conservative	Alan Quirk	1,367	58.2	+26.6
Labour	Gillian Joyce	983	41.8	−3.7
Majority		384	16.4	
Turnout		2,350	27.0	−22.2
Conservative gain from Labour		Swing		

Gossops Green & Ifield East
Party	Candidate	Votes	%	±%
Conservative	Keith Blake	1,191	38.6	
Labour	John Mortimer	893	28.9	
BNP	Dennis Kenealy	387	12.5	
Liberal Democrats	Barry Hamilton	324	10.5	
Independent	Richard Symonds	291	9.4	
Majority		298	9.7	
Turnout		3,086	38.1	
Conservative win (new seat)				

Langley Green & West Green
Party	Candidate	Votes	%	±%
Labour	Brenda Smith	1,396	45.5	
Conservative	Lee Gilroy	1,140	37.2	
Liberal Democrats	Kevin Osborne	532	17.3	
Majority		256	8.3	
Turnout		3,068	33.4	
Labour win (new seat)				

Maidenbower
Party	Candidate	Votes	%	±%
Conservative	Henry Smith	2,192	72.3	
Labour	Kieran Byrne	425	14.0	
Liberal Democrats	Suhasini Gaurishanker	415	13.7	
Majority		1,767	58.3	
Turnout		3,032	34.8	
Conservative win (new seat)				

Northgate & Three Bridges
Party	Candidate	Votes	%	±%
Conservative	Robert Burgess	1,172	40.2	+7.1
Labour	William Thomas	891	30.6	−6.2
Liberal Democrats	Malcolm Wickins	504	17.3	−5.2
English Democrat	Mark Taylor	348	11.9	N/A
Majority		281	9.6	
Turnout		2,915	36.8	−23.3
Conservative gain from Labour		Swing		

Pound Hill & Worth
Party	Candidate	Votes	%	±%
Conservative	Richard Burrett	2,308	69.7	
Liberal Democrats	Eddie Reay	640	19.3	
Labour	David Shreeves	361	10.9	
Majority		1,668	50.4	
Turnout		3,309	39.1	
Conservative win (new seat)				

Southgate & Crawley Central
Party	Candidate	Votes	%	±%
Conservative	Howard Bloom	1,097	48.2	
Labour	Michael Jones	897	39.4	
BNP	Linda Atkinson	284	12.5	
Majority		200	8.8	
Turnout		2,278	34.7	
Labour win (new seat)				

Tilgate & Furnace Green
Party	Candidate	Votes	%	±%
Conservative	Duncan Crow	1,600	46.0	+5.4
Labour	Ian Irvine	871	25.0	−12.5
Liberal Democrats	Darren Wise	607	17.4	+0.4
BNP	Vernon Atkinson	401	11.5	N/A
Majority		729	21.0	+17.9
Turnout		3,479	39.7	−23.8
Conservative hold		Swing		

=== Horsham ===
Billingshurst
Party	Candidate	Votes	%	±%
Conservative	Amanda Jupp	1,701	54.1	+3.5
UKIP	David Duke	694	22.1	N/A
Liberal Democrats	Larissa Rowe	588	18.7	−17.0
Labour	Christine Conibear	160	5.1	−8.6
Majority		1,007	32.0	+17.1
Turnout		3,143	38.4	−28.1
Conservative hold		Swing		

Bramber Castle
Party	Candidate	Votes	%	±%
Liberal Democrats	Derek Deedman	2,252	48.8	0.0
Conservative	David Barling	1,669	36.2	−3.3
UKIP	Stuart Bower	351	7.6	N/A
BNP	Donna Bailey	226	4.9	N/A
Labour	Arleene Piercy	117	2.5	−9.3
Majority		583	12.6	+3.3
Turnout		4,615	50.8	−19.6
Liberal Democrats hold		Swing		

Henfield
Party	Candidate	Votes	%	±%
Conservative	Lionel Barnard	2,221	63.5	+1.7
Liberal Democrats	Andrew Purches	830	23.7	−14.5
BNP	Tony Aldous	257	7.3	N/A
Labour	Malcolm Uhlhorn	191	5.5	N/A
Majority		1,391	39.8	+16.2
Turnout		3,499	42.3	−25.4
Conservative hold		Swing		

Holbrook
Party	Candidate	Votes	%	±%
Conservative	Peter Catchpole	1,729	47.1	+2.7
Liberal Democrats	Belinda Walters	1,590	43.3	+1.9
BNP	Francis Carlin	192	5.2	N/A
Labour	Raymond Chapman	161	4.4	−9.8
Majority		139	3.8	+0.8
Turnout		3,672	43.0	−25.7
Conservative hold		Swing		

Horsham Hurst
Party	Candidate	Votes	%	±%
Liberal Democrats	Nigel Dennis	1,697	50.8	
Conservative	Marc Kent	879	26.3	
UKIP	Claire Bridewell	279	8.3	
Green	Stacey Frier	187	5.6	
Labour	Carol Hayton	183	5.5	
BNP	Joyce Audric	118	3.5	
Majority		818	24.5	
Turnout		3,343	42.3	
Liberal Democrats win (new seat)				

Horsham Riverside
Party	Candidate	Votes	%	±%
Liberal Democrats	Morwen Millson	1,985	55.7	+3.7
Conservative	Andrew Baldwin	1,283	36.0	+3.0
Peace	Jim Duggan	159	4.5	N/A
Labour	Jonathan Austin	137	3.8	−11.2
Majority		702	19.7	+0.7
Turnout		3,564	44.6	−22.7
Liberal Democrats hold		Swing		

Horsham Tanbridge & Broadbridge Heath
Party	Candidate	Votes	%	±%
Liberal Democrats	David Sheldon	1,496	56.1	
Conservative	Laurence Deakins	1,030	38.6	
Labour	David Hide	141	5.3	
Majority		466	17.5	
Turnout		2,667	39.2	
Liberal Democrats win (new seat)				

Pulborough
Party	Candidate	Votes	%	±%
Conservative	Patricia Arculus	2,871	73.2	+9.5
Liberal Democrats	Rosalyn Deedman	829	21.1	−15.2
Labour	Antony Bignell	222	5.7	N/A
Majority		2,042	52.1	+24.7
Turnout		3,922	42.5	−25.7
Conservative hold		Swing		

Roffey
Party	Candidate	Votes	%	±%
Liberal Democrats	Warwick Hellawell	1,468	48.4	+2.9
Conservative	John Charles	1,164	38.4	−0.4
BNP	Colin Poulter	279	9.2	N/A
Labour	Andrew Skudder	123	4.1	−11.6
Majority		304	10.0	+3.3
Turnout		3,034	39.8	−24.5
Liberal Democrats hold		Swing		

Southwater & Nuthurst
Party	Candidate	Votes	%	±%
Conservative	Brian Watson	1,934	49.6	+1.2
Liberal Democrats	Peter Stainton	1,075	27.5	−13.8
UKIP	Harry Aldridge	519	13.3	N/A
Green	Tristan Loraine	261	6.7	N/A
Labour	Jane Field	113	2.9	−7.3
Majority		859	22.1	+15.0
Turnout		3,902	40.5	−28.5
Conservative hold		Swing		

Storrington
Party	Candidate	Votes	%	±%
Conservative	Frank Wilkinson	2,677	64.0	+5.2
Liberal Democrats	Susan Stokes	771	18.4	−6.9
English Democrat	Henry Powell	523	12.5	N/A
Labour	Margaret Cornwell	215	5.1	−10.8
Majority		1,906	45.6	+12.1
Turnout		4,186	43.1	−27.0
Conservative hold		Swing		

Warnham & Rusper
Party	Candidate	Votes	%	±%
Conservative	Michael Hodgson	1,783	58.9	+2.4
UKIP	Stuart Aldridge	583	19.3	N/A
Liberal Democrats	Alan Belmore	535	17.7	−11.2
Labour	Sheila Chapman	125	4.1	−10.5
Majority		1,200	39.6	+12.0
Turnout		3,026	41.7	−25.6
Conservative hold		Swing		

=== Mid Sussex ===
Burgess Hill East
Party	Candidate	Votes	%	±%
Liberal Democrats	Susan Knight	1,944	50.0	
Conservative	Jacqui Landriani	1,769	45.5	'
Labour	Peter Allott	174	4.5	
Majority		175	4.5	
Turnout		3,887	41.5	
Liberal Democrats win (new seat)				

Burgess Hill Town
Party	Candidate	Votes	%	±%
Liberal Democrats	Heather Ross	1,421	41.5	
Conservative	Andrew Barrett-Miles	1,371	40.1	
UKIP	Chris French	476	13.9	
Labour	Nigel Foulkes	152	4.4	
Majority		50	1.4	
Turnout		3,420	38.1	
Liberal Democrats win (new seat)				

Cuckfield & Lucastes
Party	Candidate	Votes	%	±%
Conservative	Peter Bradbury	1,703	46.8	−6.2
Liberal Democrats	Stephen Blanch	770	21.2	−10.1
Independent	Michael Bright	644	17.7	N/A
UKIP	Marc Montgomery	218	6.0	N/A
Green	Catherine Edminson	208	5.7	−1.4
Labour	Derek Davies	95	2.6	−5.9
Majority		933	25.6	+3.9
Turnout		3,638	45.4	−27.4
Conservative hold		Swing		

East Grinstead Meridian
Party	Candidate	Votes	%	±%
Conservative	Liz Bennett	1,408	47.5	
Liberal Democrats	Paul Johnson	1,153	38.9	
Green	James Blair	300	10.1	
Labour	Colin Moffatt	103	3.5	
Majority		255	8.6	
Turnout		2,964	35.6	
Conservative win (new seat)				

East Grinstead South & Ashurst Wood
Party	Candidate	Votes	%	±%
Conservative	Lee Quinn	1,599	44.5	
Liberal Democrats	Margaret Collins	1,469	40.9	
Green	Paul Brown	429	11.9	
Labour	Peter Lamb	94	2.6	
Majority		130	3.6	
Turnout		3,591	41.2	
Conservative win (new seat)				

Hassocks & Victoria
Party	Candidate	Votes	%	±%
Liberal Democrats	Colin Wilsdon	2,159	50.4	+7.5
Conservative	Mandy Thomas-Atkin	1,895	44.2	+4.1
Labour	Jennifer Epstein	204	4.8	−5.8
Majority		264	6.2	+3.4
Turnout		4,258	43.9	−26.0
Liberal Democrats hold		Swing		

Haywards Heath East
Party	Candidate	Votes	%	±%
Liberal Democrats	Anne Hall	1,237	41.2	+8.2
Conservative	John de Mierre	1,194	39.7	+3.4
Labour	Osiji Onah	406	13.5	−17.2
BNP	Richard Trower	168	5.6	N/A
Majority		43	1.5	
Turnout		3,005	39.1	−28.5
Liberal Democrats gain from Conservative		Swing		

Haywards Heath Town
Party	Candidate	Votes	%	±%
Liberal Democrats	Brian Hall	1,477	44.0	+4.6
Conservative	Katy Bourne	1,416	42.2	+3.6
Green	Philip Smith	289	8.6	+2.5
Labour	Pascal Atkins	175	5.2	−10.7
Majority		61	1.8	+1.0
Turnout		3,357	40.1	−29.9
Liberal Democrats hold		Swing		

Hurstpierpoint & Bolney
Party	Candidate	Votes	%	±%
Conservative	Peter Griffiths	2,038	58.4	+4.6
Liberal Democrats	Rodney Jackson	727	20.8	−7.5
Green	Michael Airey	529	15.1	N/A
Labour	Ann Morgan	198	5.7	−8.5
Majority		1,311	37.6	+12.1
Turnout		3,492	44.6	−26.1
Conservative hold		Swing		

Imberdown
Party	Candidate	Votes	%	±%
Liberal Democrats	Heidi Brunsdon	1,522	44.1	+19.0
Conservative	Phillip Coote	1,370	39.7	−8.8
UKIP	Eric Saunders	412	11.9	N/A
Labour	Alison Cornell	144	4.2	−6.9
Majority		152	4.4	
Turnout		3,448	42.6	−29.3
Liberal Democrats gain from Conservative		Swing		

Lindfield & High Weald
Party	Candidate	Votes	%	±%
Conservative	Christine Field	2,573	57.9	+5.9
Liberal Democrats	Anne-Marie Lucraft	983	22.1	−7.6
Green	Peter Wemyss-Gorman	728	16.4	+7.0
Labour	Alan Yates	158	3.6	−5.3
Majority		1,590	35.8	+13.5
Turnout		4,442	47.0	−26.5
Conservative hold		Swing		

Worth Forest
Party	Candidate	Votes	%	±%
Conservative	William Acraman	2,147	61.2	+7.8
Liberal Democrats	Nicholas Dennis	617	17.6	−4.5
Green	Maurice Weller	518	14.8	+7.3
Labour	Frank Thomson	225	6.4	−10.6
Majority		1,530	43.6	+12.3
Turnout		3,507	37.5	−31.0
Conservative hold		Swing		

=== Worthing ===
Broadwater
Party	Candidate	Votes	%	±%
Liberal Democrats	Alan Rice	1,245	38.8	
Conservative	Tom Wye	1,230	38.3	
UKIP	Lionel Parsons	559	17.4	
Labour	John Turley	177	5.5	
Majority		15	0.5	
Turnout		3,211	33.0	
Liberal Democrats win (new seat)				

Cissbury
Party	Candidate	Votes	%	±%
Conservative	Clement Stevens	1,925	52.8	
UKIP	Mike Glennon	888	24.4	
Liberal Democrats	Wayne Hoban	641	17.6	
Labour	John Gardiner	191	5.2	
Majority		1,037	28.4	
Turnout		3,645	42.6	
Conservative win (new seat)				

Durrington & Salvington
Party	Candidate	Votes	%	±%
Conservative	Nicola Waight	1,308	39.5	
Liberal Democrats	Michael Donin	1,235	37.3	
UKIP	John Wallace	768	23.2	
Majority		73	2.2	
Turnout		3,311	34.4	
Conservative win (new seat)				

Goring
Party	Candidate	Votes	%	±%
Conservative	Steve Waight	1,727	54.0	
UKIP	Richard Bater	646	20.2	
Liberal Democrats	Nick John	576	18.0	
Labour	James Elwood	248	7.8	
Majority		1,081	33.8	
Turnout		3,197	39.4	
Conservative win (new seat)				

Northbrook
Party	Candidate	Votes	%	±%
Liberal Democrats	Robin Rogers	1,524	57.9	
Conservative	John Rogers	974	37.0	
Labour	Bren Albiston	135	5.1	
Majority		550	20.9	
Turnout		2,633	31.6	
Liberal Democrats win (new seat)				

Tarring
Party	Candidate	Votes	%	±%
Liberal Democrats	Robert Smytherman	1,646	47.4	
Conservative	Paul High	1,007	29.0	
UKIP	John Harwood	628	18.1	
Labour	Sid Wells	191	5.5	
Majority		639	18.4	
Turnout		3,472	35.3	
Liberal Democrats win (new seat)				

Worthing East
Party	Candidate	Votes	%	±%
Liberal Democrats	Irene Richards	1,157	40.9	−1.0
Conservative	Roger Oakley	1,012	35.8	−3.8
UKIP	Mick Clark	424	15.0	N/A
Labour	Ann Saunders	233	8.2	−10.4
Majority		145	5.1	+2.8
Turnout		2,826	35.2	−22.3
Liberal Democrats hold		Swing		

Worthing Pier
Party	Candidate	Votes	%	±%
Liberal Democrats	James Doyle	1,097	40.1	+5.6
Conservative	Paul Yallop	1,015	37.1	−3.3
UKIP	Christopher Woodward	350	12.8	N/A
Labour	Sue Marsh	181	6.6	−10.1
English Democrat	Michael Black-Feather	93	3.4	N/A
Majority		82	3.0	
Turnout		2,736	32.0	−20.5
Liberal Democrats gain from Conservative		Swing		

Worthing West
Party	Candidate	Votes	%	±%
Conservative	John Livermore	1,529	48.9	+3.7
Liberal Democrats	Yvonne Leonard	731	23.4	−1.4
UKIP	Phil Ruddock	616	19.7	+14.6
Labour	Eileen Powell	248	7.9	−7.8
Majority		798	25.5	+5.1
Turnout		3,124	36.3	−24.2
Conservative hold		Swing		
