= Bewbush & Ifield West (electoral division) =

Electoral division of West Sussex, England

Coordinates: 51.10848°N 0.22076°W

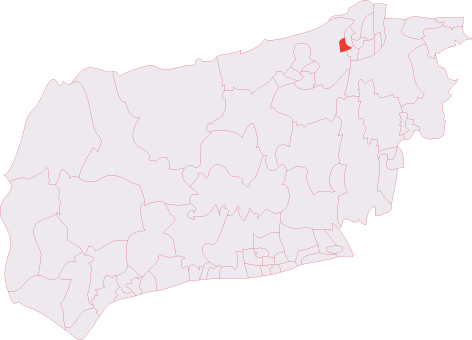
Bewbush & Ifield West
Shown within West Sussex
District:	Crawley
UK Parliament Constituency:	Crawley
Ceremonial county:	West Sussex
Electorate (2009):	8425
County Councillor
Chris Oxlade (Lab)

Bewbush & Ifield West is an electoral division of West Sussex in the United Kingdom and returns one member to sit on West Sussex County Council.

== Extent ==
The division covers the communities of Bewbush and West Ifield, which form part of the urban area of Crawley.

It falls entirely within the un-parished area of Crawley Borough and comprises the following borough wards: Bewbush Ward and the western part of Ifield Ward.

== Election results ==
=== 2013 Election ===
Results of the election held on 2 May 2013:

Bewbush & Ifield West
Party	Candidate	Votes	%	±%
Labour	Chris Oxlade	927	48.6	+12.6
UKIP	Norman Aston	492	25.8	N/A
Conservative	Duncan Peck	378	19.8	−11.7
Liberal Democrats	Lucy-Marie Nelson	70	3.7	−10.6
Justice Party	Arshad Khan	40	2.1	−2.9
Majority		435	22.8	+18.3
Turnout		1,907	22.5	−6.0
Labour hold		Swing		

=== 2009 Election ===
Results of the election held on 4 June 2009:

Bewbush & Ifield West
Party	Candidate	Votes	%	±%
Labour	Chris Oxlade	865	36.0	
Conservative	Adam Brown	758	31.5	
Liberal Democrats	Edward Arnold	344	14.3	
BNP	George Baldwin	315	13.1	
Justice Party	Arshad Khan	121	5.0	
Majority		107	4.5	
Turnout		2,403	28.5	
Labour win (new seat)				

This division came into existence as the result of a boundary review recommended by the Boundary Committee for England, the results of which were accepted by the Electoral Commission in March 2009.
