= Pound Hill & Worth (electoral division) =

Former electoral division of West Sussex, England

Coordinates: 51.13509°N 0.14952°W

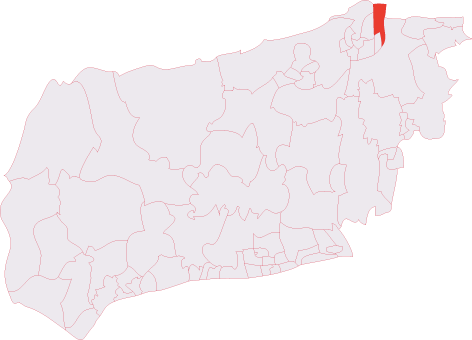
Pound Hill & Worth
Shown within West Sussex
District:	Crawley
UK Parliament Constituency:	Crawley
Ceremonial county:	West Sussex
Electorate (2009):	8474
County Councillor
Richard Burrett (Con)

Pound Hill & Worth is an electoral division of West Sussex in England, and returns one member to sit on West Sussex County Council.

== Extent ==
The division covers the neighbourhoods of Pound Hill, Tinsley Green and Worth, which form part of the urban area of the town of Crawley.

It falls entirely within the un-parished area of Crawley Borough and comprises the following borough wards: Pound Hill, North Ward and the eastern part of Pound Hill South & Worth Ward.

== Election results ==
=== 2013 Election ===
Results of the election held on 2 May 2013:

Pound Hill & Worth
Party	Candidate	Votes	%	±%
Conservative	Richard Burrett	1,493	54.0	−15.7
UKIP	John MacCanna	545	20.6	N/A
Labour	David Shreeves	413	15.6	+4.7
Green	Susi Liles	113	4.3	N/A
Liberal Democrats	Graham Knight	83	3.1	−16.2
Majority		948	33.4	−17.0
Turnout		2,647	30.3	−8.8
Conservative hold		Swing		

=== 2009 Election ===
Results of the election held on 4 June 2009:

Pound Hill & Worth
Party	Candidate	Votes	%	±%
Conservative	Richard Burrett	2,308	69.7	
Liberal Democrats	Eddie Reay	640	19.3	
Labour	David Shreeves	361	10.9	
Majority		1,668	50.4	
Turnout		3,309	39.1	
Conservative win (new seat)				

This division came into existence as the result of a boundary review recommended by the Boundary Committee for England, the results of which were accepted by the Electoral Commission in March 2009.
