= Southgate & Crawley Central (electoral division) =

Coordinates: 51.10832°N 0.19166°W

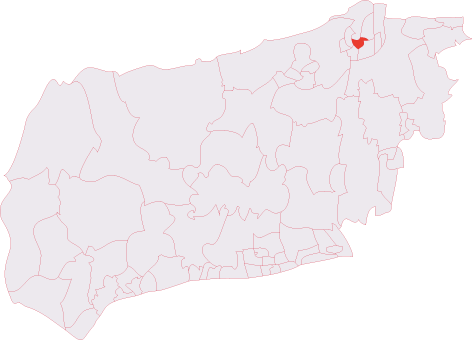
Southgate & Crawley Central
Shown within West Sussex
District:	Crawley
UK Parliament Constituency:	Crawley
Ceremonial county:	West Sussex
Electorate (2009):	6511
County Councillor
Michael Jones (Lab)

Southgate & Crawley Central is an electoral division of West Sussex in the United Kingdom, and returns one member to sit on West Sussex County Council.

== Extent ==
The division covers the town centre of Crawley, and the neighbourhood of Southgate.

It falls entirely within the un-parished area of Crawley Borough and comprises the following borough wards: the south part of Northgate Ward, Southgate Ward and the south part of Three Bridges Ward.

== Latest election result ==
=== 2013 Election ===
Results of the election held on 2 May 2013:

Southgate & Crawley Central
Party	Candidate	Votes	%	±%
Labour	Michael Jones	774	36.8	−2.6
Conservative	Howard Bloom	655	31.2	−17.0
UKIP	David Matthews	482	22.9	N/A
Green	Malcolm Liles	133	6.3	N/A
Liberal Democrats	Anthony Millson	57	2.7	N/A
Majority		119	5.6	
Turnout		2,101	27.1	−7.6
Labour gain from Conservative		Swing	+7.2%	

=== 2009 Election ===
Results of the election held on 4 June 2009:

Southgate & Crawley Central
Party	Candidate	Votes	%	±%
Conservative	Howard Bloom	1,097	48.2	
Labour	Michael Jones	897	39.4	
BNP	Linda Atkinson	284	12.5	
Majority		200	8.8	
Turnout		2,278	34.7	
Labour win (new seat)				

This division came into existence as the result of a boundary review recommended by the Boundary Committee for England, the results of which were accepted by the Electoral Commission in March 2009.
