= Cissbury (electoral division) =

Electoral division of West Sussex, England

Coordinates: 50.84877°N 0.39156°W

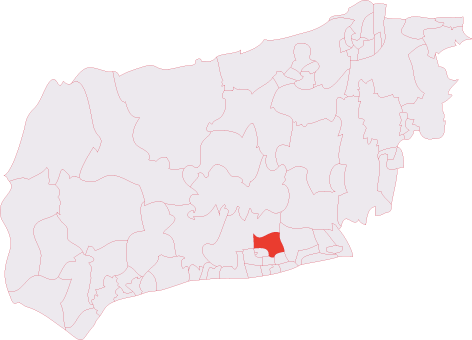
Cissbury
Shown within West Sussex
District:	Worthing
UK Parliament Constituency:	Worthing West, East Worthing & Shoreham
Ceremonial county:	West Sussex
Electorate (2009):	8565
County Councillor
Elizabeth Sparkes (Conservative)

Cissbury is an electoral division of West Sussex in the United Kingdom, and returns one member to sit on West Sussex County Council.

== Extent ==
The division covers the neighbourhoods of Findon Valley and High Salvington which form the northern part of the town of Worthing and came into existence as the result of a boundary review recommended by the Boundary Committee for England, the results of which were accepted by the Electoral Commission in March 2009.

It falls entirely within the un-parished area of Worthing Borough and comprises the following borough wards: Offington Ward and the northern part of Salvington Ward.

=== 2013 Election ===
Results of the election held on 2 May 2013:

Cissbury
Party	Candidate	Votes	%	±%
Conservative	John Rogers	1,154	41.9	−10.9
UKIP	Robin Harper	1,072	39.0	+14.6
Liberal Democrats	Victoria Taylor	213	7.7	−9.9
Labour	Ann Saunders	170	6.2	+1.0
Green	Al Emery	143	5.2	N/A
Majority		82	2.9	−25.5
Turnout		2,752	32.0	−10.6
Conservative hold		Swing	-12.8%	

=== 2009 Election ===
Results of the election held on 4 June 2009:

Cissbury
Party	Candidate	Votes	%	±%
Conservative	Clement Stevens	1,925	52.8	
UKIP	Mike Glennon	888	24.4	
Liberal Democrats	Wayne Hoban	641	17.6	
Labour	John Gardiner	191	5.2	
Majority		1,037	28.4	
Turnout		3,645	42.6	
Conservative win (new seat)				
