= Maidenbower (electoral division) =

Coordinates: 51.10934°N 0.15312°W

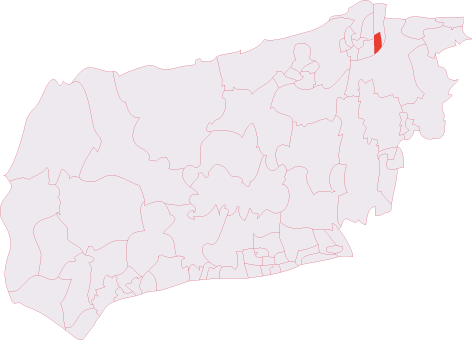
Maidenbower
Shown within West Sussex
District:	Crawley
UK Parliament Constituency:	Crawley
Ceremonial county:	West Sussex
Electorate (2009):	8720
County Councillor
Robert Lanzer (Con)

Maidenbower is an electoral division of West Sussex in the United Kingdom, and returns one member to sit on West Sussex County Council. The current County Councillor, is Robert Lanzer who won the seat in a by-election after the resignation of the former Leader of West Sussex County Council Henry Smith upon being elected as Member of Parliament for Crawley.

== Extent ==
The division covers the neighbourhoods of Maidenbower and the southern part of Pound Hill, which form part of the urban area of the town of Crawley.

It falls entirely within the un-parished area of Crawley Borough and comprises the following borough wards: Maidenbower Ward and the western part of Pound Hill South & Worth Ward.

== Election results ==
=== 2013 Election ===
Results of the election held on 2 May 2013:

Maidenbower
Party	Candidate	Votes	%	±%
Conservative	Bob Lanzer	1,165	50.3	−22.0
Labour	Peter Smith	506	21.8	+7.8
UKIP	Simon Mizzi	462	19.9	N/A
Green	Ben Liles	104	4.5	N/A
Liberal Democrats	Bill Morrison	79	3.4	−10.3
Majority		659	28.5	−6.3
Turnout		2,316	24.9	−9.9
Conservative hold		Swing	14.9% Con to Lab	

=== 2010 By-Election ===
Results of the election held on 7 October 2010:

Maidenbower
Party	Candidate	Votes	%	±%
Conservative	Robert Lanzer	1036	64.4	− 7.9
Labour	Peter Smith	417	25.9	+ 11.9
Liberal Democrats	Sulu Pandya	82	5,1	− 8.6
UKIP	John MacCanna	61	3.8	N/A
Justice Party	Arshad Khan	12	0.7	N/A
Majority		619	48.5	− 9.8
Turnout		1626	17.1	− 17.6
Conservative hold		Swing	9.9	

=== 2009 Election ===
Results of the election held on 4 June 2009:

Maidenbower
Party	Candidate	Votes	%	±%
Conservative	Henry Smith	2,192	72.3	
Labour	Kieran Byrne	425	14.0	
Liberal Democrats	Suhasini Gaurishanker	415	13.7	
Majority		1,767	58.3	
Turnout		3,032	34.8	
Conservative win (new seat)				

The division came into existence as the result of a boundary review recommended by the Boundary Committee for England, the results of which were accepted by the Electoral Commission in March 2009.
