= Northbrook (electoral division) =

Coordinates: 50.82882°N 0.42744°W

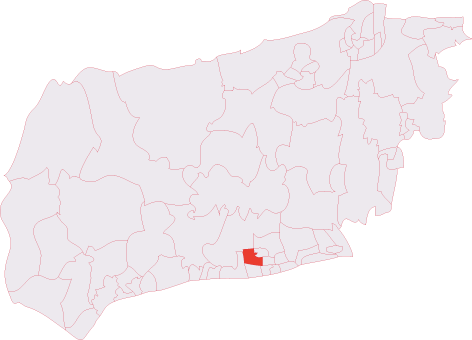
Northbrook
Shown within West Sussex
District:	Worthing
UK Parliament Constituency:	Worthing West
Ceremonial county:	West Sussex
Electorate (2009):	8333
County Councillor
Sean McDonald (Conservative)

Northbrook is an electoral division of West Sussex in the United Kingdom, and returns one member to sit on West Sussex County Council.

== Extent ==
The division covers the neighbourhood of Northbrook, which forms part of the urban area of the town of Worthing and came into existence as the result of a boundary review recommended by the Boundary Committee for England, the results of which were accepted by the Electoral Commission in March 2009.

It falls entirely within the un-parished area of Worthing Borough and comprises the following borough wards: the northern part of Castle Ward and Northbrook Ward.

== Election results ==
=== 2013 Election ===
Results of the election held on 2 May 2013:

Northbrook
Party	Candidate	Votes	%	±%
Liberal Democrats	Robin Rogers	695	31.5	−26.4
Conservative	Daniel Humphreys	690	31.3	−5.7
UKIP	Mike Jelliss	530	24.1	N/A
Labour	Philip Dufty	211	9.6	+4.5
Green	Melanie Muir	77	3.5	N/A
Majority		5	0.2	−20.7
Turnout		2,203	26.3	−5.3
Liberal Democrats hold		Swing		

=== 2009 Election ===
Results of the election held on 4 June 2009:

Northbrook
Party	Candidate	Votes	%	±%
Liberal Democrats	Robin Rogers	1,524	57.9	
Conservative	John Rogers	974	37.0	
Labour	Bren Albiston	135	5.1	
Majority		550	20.9	
Turnout		2,633	31.6	
Liberal Democrats win (new seat)				
