= Burgess Hill East (electoral division) =

Coordinates: 51.09662°N 0.12188°W

Burgess Hill East is an electoral division of West Sussex in the United Kingdom, and returns one member to sit on West Sussex County Council.

== Extent ==
The division covers the eastern half of the town of Burgess Hill and came into existence as the result of a boundary review recommended by the Boundary Committee for England, the results of which were accepted by the Electoral Commission in March 2009.

It comprises the following Mid Sussex District wards: Burgess Hill Franklands Ward, the southern part of Burgess Hill Meeds Ward and Burgess Hill St. Andrews Ward; and of the eastern part of the civil parish of Burgess Hill.

== Election results ==
=== 2026 Election ===
Results of the election held on 7 May 2026:

Burgess Hill East
Party	Candidate	Votes	%	±%
Liberal Democrats	Richard Cherry	1,919	39	−4
Reform	Archie Sheail	1,210	24	N/A
Conservative	Sebastian Monk	957	19	n/a
Green	Colin Clark	684	14	n/a
Labour	Jake Tennant	201	4	+4
Majority		280	8.4	N/A
Turnout		3,324	35.0	−6.5
gain from		Swing		

=== 2009 Election ===
Results of the election held on 4 June 2009:

Burgess Hill East
Party	Candidate	Votes	%	±%
Liberal Democrats	Susan Knight	1,944	50.0	
Conservative	Jacqui Landriani	1,769	45.5	'
Labour	Peter Allott	174	4.5	
Majority		175	4.5	
Turnout		3,887	41.5	
Liberal Democrats win (new seat)				
