= Goring (electoral division) =

Electoral division of West Sussex, United Kingdom

Coordinates: 50.81233°N 0.42452°W

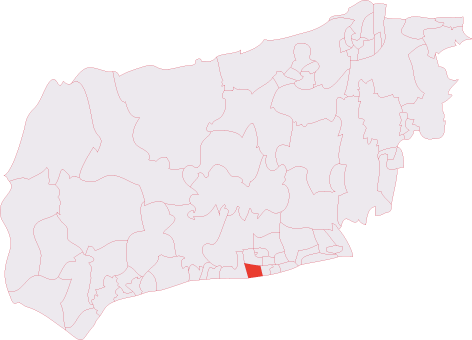
Goring
Shown within West Sussex
District:	Worthing
UK Parliament Constituency:	Worthing West
Ceremonial county:	West Sussex
Electorate (2009):	8115
County Councillor
Steve Waight (Con)

Goring is an electoral division of West Sussex in the United Kingdom, and returns one member to sit on West Sussex County Council.

== Extent ==
The division covers the neighbourhood of Goring-by-Sea, which forms part of the urban area of the town of Worthing and came into existence as the result of a boundary review recommended by the Boundary Committee for England, the results of which were accepted by the Electoral Commission in March 2009.

It falls entirely within the un-parished area of Worthing Borough and comprises the following borough wards: the southern part of Castle Ward and Goring Ward.

== Election results ==
=== 2013 Election ===
Results of the election held on 2 May 2013:

Goring
Party	Candidate	Votes	%	±%
Conservative	Steve Waight	1,079	42.0	−12.0
UKIP	Richard Bater	898	35.0	+14.8
Labour	Janet Haden	225	8.8	+1.0
Liberal Democrats	Neil Campbell	189	7.4	−10.6
Green	David Aherne	176	6.9	N/A
Majority		181	7.0	−26.8
Turnout		2,567	31.3	−8.1
Conservative hold		Swing	-13.4%	

=== 2009 Election ===
Results of the election held on 4 June 2009:

Goring
Party	Candidate	Votes	%	±%
Conservative	Steve Waight	1,727	54.0	
UKIP	Richard Bater	646	20.2	
Liberal Democrats	Nick John	576	18.0	
Labour	James Elwood	248	7.8	
Majority		1,081	33.8	
Turnout		3,197	39.4	
Conservative win (new seat)				
