= Gossops Green & Ifield East (electoral division) =

Coordinates: 51.11764°N 0.21458°W

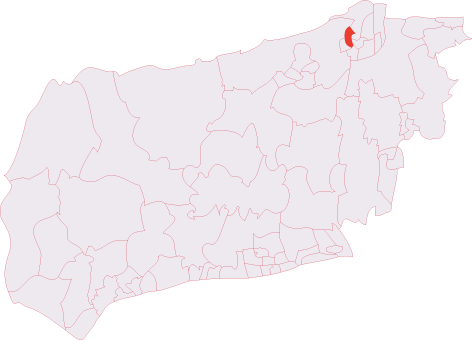
Gossops Green & Ifield East
Shown within West Sussex
District:	Crawley
UK Parliament Constituency:	Crawley
Ceremonial county:	West Sussex
Electorate (2009):	8110
County Councillor
Sue Mullins (Lab)

Gossops Green & Ifield East is an electoral division of West Sussex in the United Kingdom, and returns one member to sit on West Sussex County Council.

== Extent ==
The division covers the neighbourhoods of Gossops Green and Ifield, which form part of the urban area of the town of Crawley.

It falls entirely within the un-parished area of Crawley Borough and comprises the following borough wards: Gossops Green Ward and the eastern part of Ifield Ward.

== Election results ==
=== 2013 Election ===
Results of the election held on 2 May 2013:

Gossops Green & Ifield East
Party	Candidate	Votes	%	±%
Labour	Sue Mullins	1,109	41.0	+13.1
Conservative	Ken Trussell	720	26.6	−12.0
UKIP	Stephen Wade	705	26.1	N/A
Green	Iain Dickson	106	3.9	N/A
Liberal Democrats	Gregory-George Collins	62	2.3	−8.2
Majority		389	14.4	N/A
Turnout		2,702	32.3	−5.8
Labour gain from Conservative		Swing	12.6% Con to Lab	

=== 2009 Election ===
Results of the election held on 4 June 2009:

Gossops Green & Ifield East
Party	Candidate	Votes	%	±%
Conservative	Keith Blake	1,191	38.6	
Labour	John Mortimer	893	28.9	
BNP	Dennis Kenealy	387	12.5	
Liberal Democrats	Barry Hamilton	324	10.5	
Independent	Richard Symonds	291	9.4	
Majority		298	9.7	
Turnout		3,086	38.1	
Conservative win (new seat)				

This division came into existence as the result of a boundary review recommended by the Boundary Committee for England, the results of which were accepted by the Electoral Commission in March 2009.
