= Warnham & Rusper (electoral division) =

Coordinates: 51.09533°N 0.34676°W

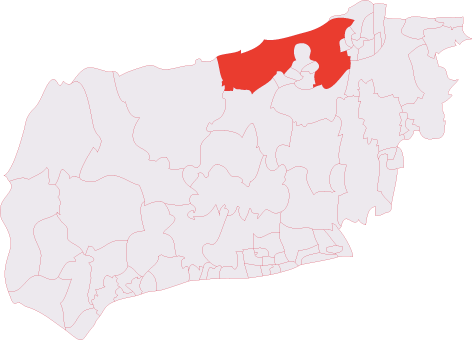
Warnham & Rusper
Shown within West Sussex
District:	Horsham
UK Parliament Constituency:	Horsham
Ceremonial county:	West Sussex
Electorate (2013):	7465
County Councillor
Liz Kitchen (Con)

Warnham & Rusper is an electoral division of West Sussex in the United Kingdom and returns one member to sit on West Sussex County Council. The current County Councillor, Mick Hodgson, is also Vice-Chairman of West Sussex County Council.

== Extent ==
The division covers the villages of Colgate, Faygate, Kingsfold, Lambs Green, Rowhook, Rudgwick, Rusper, Slinfold, Tisman's Common, Warnham and Winterfold.

It comprises the following Horsham District wards: the north part of Itchingfield, Slinfold & Warnham Ward, Rudgwick Ward and Rusper & Colgate Ward; and of the following civil parishes: Colgate, Rudgwick, Rusper, Slinfold and Warnham.

Between the 2005 and 2009 boundary changes took place which transferred village of Broadbridge Heath to the newly created Division of Horsham Tanbridge & Broadbridge Heath and transferred the Parish of Colgate form the Division Billingshurst of in to the Division.

On 23 August 2013 Mick Hodgson died, this necessitated the holding of a bye-election, which was held on 24 October 2013

== Election results ==
=== 2013 Bye-election ===
Results of the bye-election held on 24 October 2013:

Warnham & Rusper
Party	Candidate	Votes	%	±%
Conservative	Liz Kitchen	868	58.3	+3.3
UKIP	Geoff Stevens	335	22.5	−7.7
Green	Darrin Green	119	8.0	N/A
Liberal Democrats	Tony Millson	103	6.9	−7.9
Labour	Carol Hayton	63	4.4	N/A
Majority		533	36.8	+12..0
Turnout		1490	20.1	−10.1
Conservative hold		Swing	+5.5	

=== 2013 election ===
Results of the election held on 2 May 2013:

Warnham & Rusper
Party	Candidate	Votes	%	±%
Conservative	Mick Hodgson	1,228	55.0	−3.9
UKIP	Geoff Stevens	673	30.2	+10.9
Liberal Democrats	Ian Shepherd	331	14.8	−2.9
Majority		555	24.8	−14.8
Turnout		2,232	30.2	−11.5
Conservative hold		Swing	-7.4%	

=== 2009 election ===
Results of the election held on 4 June 2009:

Warnham & Rusper
Party	Candidate	Votes	%	±%
Conservative	Mick Hodgson	1,783	58.9	+2.4
UKIP	Stuart Aldridge	583	19.3	N/A
Liberal Democrats	Alan Belmore	535	17.7	−11.2
Labour	Sheila Chapman	125	4.1	−10.5
Majority		1,200	39.6	+12.0
Turnout		3,026	41.7	−25.6
Conservative hold		Swing		

=== 2005 election ===
Results of the election held on 5 May 2005:

Warnham & Rusper
Party	Candidate	Votes	%	±%
Conservative	Mr M P S Hodgson	3,217	56.5	
Liberal Democrats	Mr T H Pearce	1,645	28.9	
Labour	Ms J A Battersby	832	14.6	
Majority		1,572	27.6	
Turnout		5,694	67.3	
Conservative win (new seat)				
