= Langley Green & West Green (electoral division) =

Electoral division of West Sussex, England

Coordinates: 51.14403°N 0.19604°W

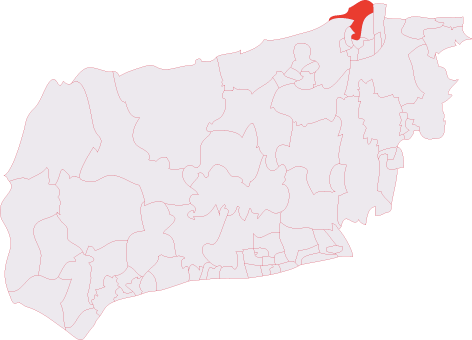
Langley Green & West Green
Shown within West Sussex
District:	Crawley
UK Parliament Constituency:	Crawley
Ceremonial county:	West Sussex
Electorate (2009):	9193
County Councillor
Brenda Smith (Lab)

Langley Green & West Green is an electoral division of West Sussex in the United Kingdom, and returns one member to sit on West Sussex County Council.

== Extent ==
The division covers the neighbourhoods of Langley Green and West Green, which form part of the urban area of the town of Crawley, and also Gatwick Airport.

It falls entirely within the un-parished area of Crawley Borough and comprises the following borough wards: Langley Green Ward and West Green Ward.

== Election results ==
=== 2013 Election ===
Results of the election held on 3 May 2013:

Langley Green & West Green
Party	Candidate	Votes	%	±%
Labour	Brenda Smith	1,558	58.4	+12.9
UKIP	Peter Brent	533	20.0	N/A
Conservative	Vanessa Cumper	499	18.7	−18.5
Liberal Democrats	Kevin Osborne	77	2.9	−14.4
Majority		1,025	38.4	+30.1
Turnout		2,667	27.9	−5.4
Labour hold		Swing		

=== 2009 Election ===
Results of the election held on 4 June 2009:

Langley Green & West Green
Party	Candidate	Votes	%	±%
Labour	Brenda Smith	1,396	45.5	
Conservative	Lee Gilroy	1,140	37.2	
Liberal Democrats	Kevin Osborne	532	17.3	
Majority		256	8.3	
Turnout		3,068	33.4	
Labour win (new seat)				

This division came into existence as the result of a boundary review recommended by the Boundary Committee for England, the results of which were accepted by the Electoral Commission in March 2009.
