= Broadwater (electoral division) =

Electoral division of West Sussex, England

Coordinates: 50.82611°N 0.36924°W

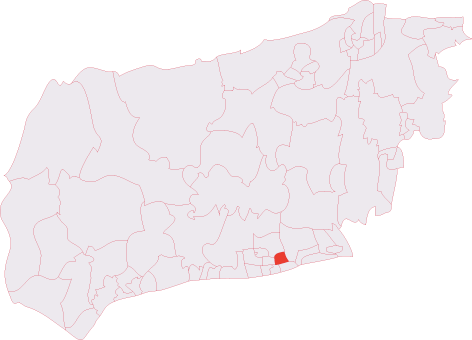
Broadwater
Shown within West Sussex
District:	Worthing
UK Parliament Constituency:	East Worthing & Shoreham
Ceremonial county:	West Sussex
Electorate (2009):	9738
County Councillor
Bryan Turner (Con)

Broadwater is an electoral division of West Sussex in the United Kingdom, and returns one member to sit on West Sussex County Council.

== Extent ==
The division covers the original settlement of Worthing of Broadwater village and came into existence as the result of a boundary review recommended by the Boundary Committee for England, the results of which were accepted by the Electoral Commission in March 2009.

It falls entirely within the un-parished area of Worthing Borough and comprises the following borough wards: all but WA3 polling district of Broadwater Ward and the eastern part of Gaisford Ward.

== Election results ==
=== 2013 Election ===
Results of the election held on 2 May 2013:

Broadwater
Party	Candidate	Votes	%	±%
Conservative	Bryan Turner	734	31.2	−7.1
UKIP	Colin Avis	646	27.5	+9.9
Liberal Democrats	Alan Rice	601	25.6	−13.2
Labour	John Turley	369	15.7	+10.2
Majority		88	3.7	
Turnout		2,350	23.7	−9.3
Conservative gain from Liberal Democrats		Swing		

=== 2009 Election ===
Results of the election held on 4 June 2009:

Broadwater
Party	Candidate	Votes	%	±%
Liberal Democrats	Alan Rice	1,245	38.8	
Conservative	Tom Wye	1,230	38.3	
UKIP	Lionel Parsons	559	17.4	
Labour	John Turley	177	5.5	
Majority		15	0.5	
Turnout		3,211	33.0	
Liberal Democrats win (new seat)				
