= Burgess Hill Town (electoral division) =

Coordinates: 50.96372°N 0.13887°W

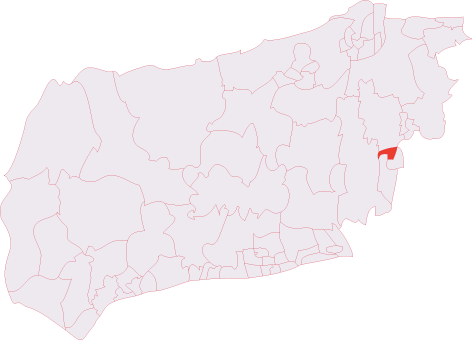
Burgess Hill Town
Shown within West Sussex
District:	Mid Sussex
UK Parliament Constituency:	Mid Sussex
Ceremonial county:	West Sussex
Electorate (2009):	8989
County Councillor
Andrew Barrett-Miles (Con)

Burgess Hill Town is an electoral division of West Sussex in the United Kingdom, and returns one member to sit on West Sussex County Council.

== Extent ==
The division covers the northern part of the town of Burgess Hill, and came into existence as a result of a boundary review by the Boundary Committee for England, the results of which were accepted by the Electoral Commission in March 2009.

It comprises the following Mid Sussex District wards: Burgess Hill Dunstall, Burgess Hill Leylands and the northern part of Burgess Hill Meeds; and of the northern part of the civil parish of Burgess Hill.

== Election results ==
=== 2013 Election ===
Results of the election held on 2 May 2013:

Burgess Hill Town
Party	Candidate	Votes	%	±%
Conservative	Andrew Barrett-Miles	1,016	36.6	−3.5
UKIP	Chris French	709	25.5	+11.6
Liberal Democrats	Roger Cartwright	576	20.7	−20.8
Labour	Janet Smith	384	13.8	+9.4
Green	Victoria Grimmett	91	3.3	N/A
Majority		307	11.1	
Turnout		2,776	30.6	−7.5
Conservative gain from Liberal Democrats		Swing		

=== 2009 Election ===
Results of the election held on 4 June 2009:

Burgess Hill Town
Party	Candidate	Votes	%	±%
Liberal Democrats	Heather Ross	1,421	41.5	
Conservative	Andrew Barrett-Miles	1,371	40.1	
UKIP	Chris French	476	13.9	
Labour	Nigel Foulkes	152	4.4	
Majority		50	1.4	
Turnout		3,420	38.1	
Liberal Democrats win (new seat)				
