= East Grinstead South & Ashurst Wood (electoral division) =

Electoral division of West Sussex, United Kingdom

Coordinates: 51.11317°N 0.00790°W

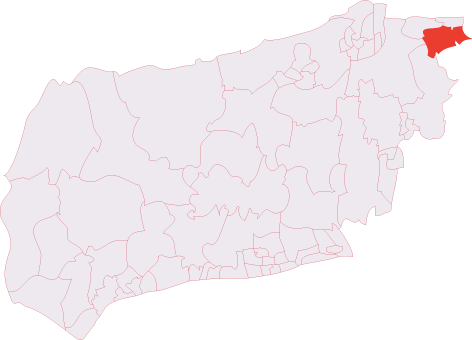
East Grinstead South & Ashurst Wood
Shown within West Sussex
District:	Mid Sussex
UK Parliament Constituency:	Mid Sussex
Ceremonial county:	West Sussex
Electorate (2017):	9177
County Councillor
Jacquie Russell (Con)

East Grinstead South & Ashurst Wood is an electoral division of West Sussex in the United Kingdom, and returns one member to sit on West Sussex County Council.

== Extent ==
The division covers the southern part of the town of East Grinstead and the village of Ashurst Wood, and it came into existence as the result of a boundary review recommended by the Boundary Committee for England, the results of which were accepted by the Electoral Commission in March 2009.

It comprises the following Mid Sussex District wards: Ashurst Wood Ward, East Grinstead Herontye Ward and the southern part of East Grinstead Town Ward; and of the following civil parishes: of Ashurst Wood and the southern part of East Grinstead.

== Election results ==
=== West Sussex County Council election, 2017/2017 Election ===
Results of the election held on 4 May 2017:

East Grinstead South & Ashurst Wood
Party	Candidate	Votes	%	±%
Conservative	Jacquie Russell	1,505	55.7	+55.0
UKIP	Barry Noldart	129	4.77	−18.33
Liberal Democrats	Paul Johnson	626	23.1	+4.2
Green	Sandra Eichner	241	8.91	+1.21
Labour	David Wilbraham	195	7.21	+0.71
Majority		879	32.5	+11.8
Turnout		2,702	29.5	+2.0
Conservative hold		Swing		

=== 2009 Election ===
Results of the election held on 4 June 2009:

East Grinstead South & Ashurst Wood
Party	Candidate	Votes	%	±%
Conservative	Lee Quinn	1,599	44.5	
Liberal Democrats	Margaret Collins	1,469	40.9	
Green	Paul Brown	429	11.9	
Labour	Peter Lamb	94	2.6	
Majority		130	3.6	
Turnout		3,591	41.2	
Conservative win (new seat)				
