= Lancing (electoral division) =

Coordinates: 50.83294°N 0.31294°W

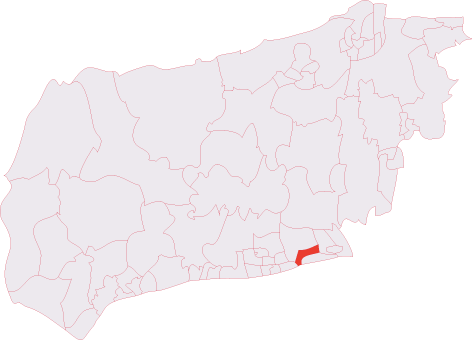
Lancing
Shown within West Sussex
District:	Adur
UK Parliament Constituency:	East Worthing & Shoreham
Ceremonial county:	West Sussex
Electorate (2009):	8096
County Councillor
Ann Bridges (Conservative)

Lancing is an electoral division of West Sussex in the United Kingdom, and returns one member to sit on West Sussex County Council.

== Extent ==
The division covers the central part of the urban area of Lancing, as well as Shoreham Airport.

It comprises the following Adur district wards: Churchill Ward, the south part of Manor Ward, and Mash Barn Ward; and of the central part of Lancing civil parish.

== Election results ==
=== 2013 Election ===
Results of the election held on 2 May 2013:

Lancing
Party	Candidate	Votes	%	±%
UKIP	Mike Glennon	1,323	53.8	+25.0
Conservative	Angie Mills	505	20.5	−13.9
Labour	Douglas Bradley	272	11.1	+2.7
Liberal Democrats	Stephen Martin	243	9.9	−19.5
Green	Louise Carroll	117	4.8	+4.8
Majority		818	33.3	+33.3
Turnout		2,460	29.8	−1.8
UKIP gain from Conservative		Swing		

=== 2009 Election ===
Results of the election held on 4 June 2009:

Lancing
Party	Candidate	Votes	%	±%
Conservative	Angela Mills	880	34.4	−3.0
Liberal Democrats	Steve Martin	753	29.4	−1.2
UKIP	David Bushell	710	27.8	+20.8
Labour	David Devoy	215	8.4	−16.6
Majority		127	5.0	−1.8
Turnout		2,558	31.6	−27.9
Conservative hold		Swing		

=== 2005 Election ===
Results of the election held on 5 May 2005:

Lancing
Party	Candidate	Votes	%	±%
Conservative	Carson Albury	2,201	37.4	
Liberal Democrats	Richard Burt	1,799	30.6	
Labour	Kenneth Bashford	1,470	25.0	
UKIP	Lionel Parsons	413	7.0	
Majority		731	6.8	
Turnout		5,883	59.5	
Conservative win (new seat)				
