= Chichester North (electoral division) =

Electoral division of West Sussex, England

Coordinates: 50.89156°N 0.74484°W

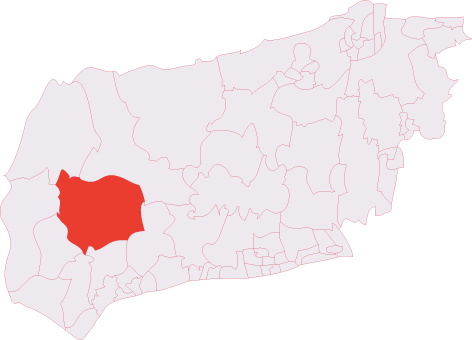
Chichester North
Shown within West Sussex
District:	Chichester
UK Parliament Constituency:	Chichester
Ceremonial county:	West Sussex
Electorate (2009):	8248
County Councillor
Jeremy Hunt (Con)

Chichester North is an electoral division of West Sussex in the United Kingdom, and returns one member to sit on West Sussex County Council.

== Extent ==
The division covers the northern part of the town of Chichester; and the villages of Boxgrove, Charlton, Chilgrove, Eartham, East Dean, East Lavant, Halnaker, Mid Lavant, Singleton, Upwaltham, West Dean and Westhampnett.

It comprises the following Chichester District wards: Boxgrove Ward, Chichester North Ward and Lavant Ward; and of the following civil parishes: Boxgrove, the northern part of Chichester, Eartham, East Dean, Lavant, Singleton, Upwaltham, West Dean and Westhampnett.

== Election results ==
=== 2013 Election ===
Results of the election held on 2 May 2013:

Chichester North
Party	Candidate	Votes	%	±%
Conservative	Jeremy Hunt	1,431	49.8	−2.6
UKIP	Michael Mason	675	23.5	+11.4
Liberal Democrats	John Illenden	464	16.2	−14.6
Labour	Michael Waite	303	10.5	+5.9
Majority		756	26.3	+4.7
Turnout		2,873	31.9	−12.1
Conservative hold		Swing		

=== 2009 Election ===
Results of the election held on 4 June 2009:

Chichester North
Party	Candidate	Votes	%	±%
Conservative	Mike Hall	1,901	52.4	+17.5
Liberal Democrats	Richard Plowman	1,118	30.8	−17.9
UKIP	Michael Mason	439	12.1	+6.7
Labour	Margaret Dyer	168	4.6	−6.4
Majority		783	21.6	+21.6
Turnout		3,626	44.0	−24.4
Conservative gain from Liberal Democrats		Swing		

=== 2005 Election ===
Results of the election held on 5 May 2005:

Chichester North
Party	Candidate	Votes	%	±%
Liberal Democrats	Mr M N Hall	2,628	48.7	
Conservative	Mrs H A Flynn	1,884	34.9	
Labour	Mr D Morrison	593	11.0	
UKIP	Mr M A H Mason	290	5.4	
Majority		744	13.8	
Turnout		5,395	68.4	
Liberal Democrats win (new seat)				
