= Northgate & Three Bridges (electoral division) =

British electoral area

Coordinates: 51.13046°N 0.17355°W

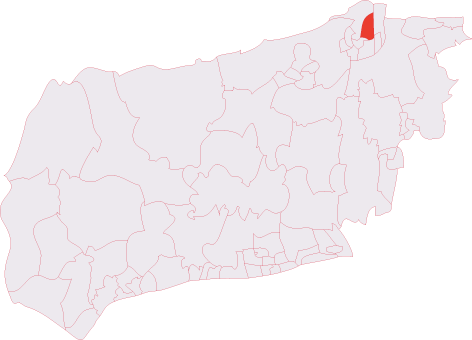
Northgate & Three Bridges
Shown within West Sussex
District:	Crawley
UK Parliament Constituency:	Crawley
Ceremonial county:	West Sussex
Electorate (2009):	7933
County Councillor
Peter Lamb (Lab)

Northgate & Three Bridges is an electoral division of West Sussex in the United Kingdom, and returns one member to sit on West Sussex County Council.

== Extent ==
The division covers the neighbourhoods of Northgate and Three Bridges, which form part of the urban area of the town of Crawley, and also the large Manor Royal industrial zone.

It falls entirely within the un-parished area of Crawley Borough and comprises the following borough wards: the northern part of Northgate Ward, and Three Bridges Ward.

== Election results ==
=== 2013 Election ===
Results of the election held on 2 May 2013:

Northgate & Three Bridges
Party	Candidate	Votes	%	±%
Labour	Peter Lamb	1,065	40.2	+9.6
Conservative	Bob Burgess	894	33.8	−6.4
UKIP	Andrew Gill	562	21.2	N/A
Liberal Democrats	David Anderson	127	4.8	−12.5
Majority		171	6.4	N/A
Turnout		2,648	31.9	−4.9
Labour gain from Conservative		Swing	8.0% Con to Lab	

=== 2009 Election ===
Results of the election held on 4 June 2009:

Northgate & Three Bridges
Party	Candidate	Votes	%	±%
Conservative	Robert Burgess	1,172	40.2	+7.1
Labour	Geraint Thomas	891	30.6	−6.2
Liberal Democrats	Malcolm Wickins	504	17.3	−5.2
English Democrat	Mark Thomas	348	11.9	N/A
Majority		281	9.6	
Turnout		2,915	36.8	−23.3
Conservative gain from Labour		Swing		

=== 2005 Election ===
Results of the election held on 5 May 2005:

Northgate & Three Bridges
Party	Candidate	Votes	%	±%
Labour	Ms G D Joyce	1,719	36.8	
Conservative	Ms B J Burgess	1,546	33.1	
Liberal Democrats	Mr D J Barry	1,049	22.5	
BNP	Mr R N Grice	215	4.6	
Green	Mrs M F Liles	143	3.1	
Majority		173	3.7	
Turnout		4,672	60.1	
Labour win (new seat)				
