= Haywards Heath Town (electoral division) =

Electoral division of West Sussex, in the United Kingdom

Coordinates: 50.99936°N 0.10476°W

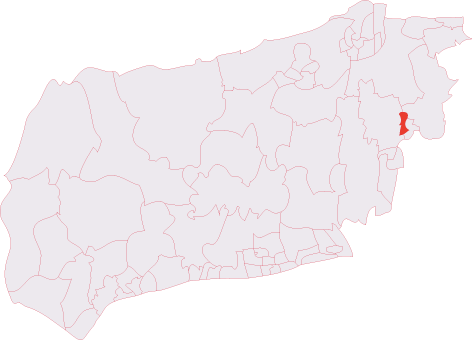
Haywards Heath Town
Shown within West Sussex
District:	Mid Sussex
UK Parliament Constituency:	Mid Sussex
Ceremonial County:	West Sussex
Electorate (2009):	8191
County Councillor
Sujan Wickremaratchi (Con)

Haywards Heath Town is an electoral division of West Sussex in the United Kingdom, and returns one member to sit on West Sussex County Council.

== Extent ==
The division covers the central part of the town of Haywards Heath.

It comprises the following Mid Sussex District wards: Haywards Heath Ashenground Ward and Haywards Heath Heath Ward; and of the central part of the civil parish of Haywards Heath.

== Election results ==
=== 2013 Election ===
Results of the election held on 2 May 2013:

Haywards Heath Town
Party	Candidate	Votes	%	±%
Conservative	Sujan Wickremaratchi	951	35.9	−6.3
UKIP	Howard Burrell	614	23.2	N/A
Liberal Democrats	Richard Bates	589	22.2	−23.8
Labour	Greg Mountain	495	18.7	+13.5
Majority		337	12.7	
Turnout		2,649	32.6	−7.9
Conservative gain from Liberal Democrats		Swing		

=== 2009 Election ===
Results of the election held on 4 June 2009:

Haywards Heath Town
Party	Candidate	Votes	%	±%
Liberal Democrats	Brian Hall	1,477	44.0	+4.6
Conservative	Katy Bourne	1,416	42.2	+3.6
Green	Philip Smith	289	8.6	+2.5
Labour	Pascal Atkins	175	5.2	−10.7
Majority		61	1.8	+1.0
Turnout		3,357	40.1	−29.9
Liberal Democrats hold		Swing		

=== 2005 Election ===
Results of the election held on 5 May 2005:

Haywards Heath Town
Party	Candidate	Votes	%	±%
Liberal Democrats	Mr B Hall	2,096	39.4	
Conservative	Mrs M N Baker	2,052	38.6	
Labour	Mr R Goddard	846	15.9	
Green	Mr P P Smith	324	6.1	
Majority		44	0.8	
Turnout		5,318	70.0	
Liberal Democrats win (new seat)				
