= Horsham Tanbridge & Broadbridge Heath (electoral division) =

Coordinates: 51.06114°N 0.35414°W

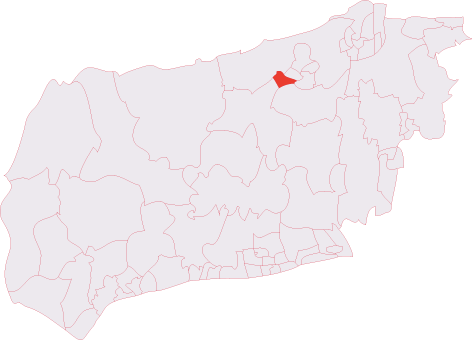
Horsham Tanbridge & Broadbridge Heath
Shown within West Sussex
| District: | Horsham |
| UK Parliament Constituency: | Horsham |
| Ceremonial county: | West Sussex |
| Electorate (2009): | 6800 |
County Councillor
David Sheldon (LD)

Horsham Tanbridge & Broadbridge Heath is an electoral division of West Sussex in England, and returns one member to sit on West Sussex County Council.

== Extent ==
The division covers the southwestern part of the town of Horsham and the village of Broadbridge Heath.

It comprises the following Horsham District wards: Broadbridge Heath Ward and Denne Ward; and of the following civil parishes: the southwestern part of Horsham, and Broadbridge Heath.

== Election results ==
=== 2013 Election ===
Results of the election held on 2 May 2013:

Horsham Tanbridge & Broadbridge Heath
| Party | Candidate | Votes | % | ±% |
|---|---|---|---|---|
| Liberal Democrats | David Sheldon | 721 | 35.7 | −20.4 |
| Conservative | Ronald Vimpany | 551 | 27.3 | −11.3 |
| UKIP | Martin Bridewell | 537 | 26.6 | N/A |
| Labour | Raymond Chapman | 212 | 10.5 | +5.2 |
| Majority | | 170 | 8.4 | −9.1 |
| Turnout | | 2,021 | 29.2 | −10.0 |
| Liberal Democrats hold | | Swing | | |

=== 2009 Election ===
Results of the election held on 4 June 2009:

Horsham Tanbridge & Broadbridge Heath
| Party | Candidate | Votes | % | ±% |
|---|---|---|---|---|
| Liberal Democrats | David Sheldon | 1,496 | 56.1 | |
| Conservative | Laurence Deakins | 1,030 | 38.6 | |
| Labour | David Hide | 141 | 5.3 | |
| Majority | | 466 | 17.5 | |
| Turnout | | 2,667 | 39.2 | |
| Liberal Democrats win (new seat) | | | | |

This division came into existence as the result of a boundary review recommended by the Boundary Committee for England, the results of which were accepted by the Electoral Commission in March 2009.
