= Storrington (electoral division) =

Coordinates: 50.91039°N 0.44426°W

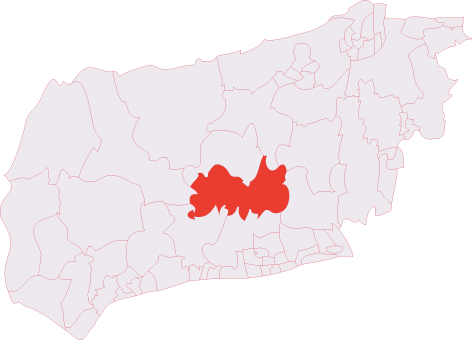
Storrington
Shown within West Sussex
District:	Horsham
UK Parliament Constituency:	Arundel & South Downs
Ceremonial county:	West Sussex
Electorate (2013):	10045
County Councillor
Philip Circus (Con)

Storrington is an electoral division of West Sussex in the United Kingdom and returns one member to West Sussex County Council.

== Extent ==
The division covers the villages of Amberley, Ashington, Greatham, North Stoke, Rackham, Storrington, Sullington, Washington, Wiggonholt and Wiston.

It comprises the following Horsham District wards: the southern part of Chanctonbury Ward, and Chantry Ward; and of the following civil parishes: Amberley, Ashington, Parham, Storrington & Sullington, Washington and Wiston.

On 21 July 2013 Frank Wilkinson died from cancer, this necessitated the holding of a bye-election, which was held on 26 September 2013

== Election results ==
=== 2013 Bye-election ===
Results of the bye-election held on 26 September 2013:

Storrington
Party	Candidate	Votes	%	±%
Conservative	Philip Circus	1,037	45.9	−2.0
UKIP	John Wallace	729	32.2	−7.8
Liberal Democrats	Nick Hopkinson	364	16.1	+2.0
Green	James Doyle	131	5.8	N/A
Majority		308	13.7	+3.8
Turnout		2,261	22.5	−10.6
Conservative hold		Swing	+2.9	

=== 2013 Election ===
Results of the election held on 2 May 2013:

Storrington
Party	Candidate	Votes	%	±%
Conservative	Frank Wilkinson	1,580	47.9	−16.1
UKIP	Graham Croft-Smith	1,252	38.0	N/A
Liberal Democrats	Nick Hopkinson	464	14.1	−4.3
Majority		328	9.9	−35.7
Turnout		3,296	33.1	−10.0
Conservative hold		Swing		

=== 2009 Election ===
The latest election took place on 4 June 2009:

Storrington
Party	Candidate	Votes	%	±%
Conservative	Frank Wilkinson	2,677	64.0	+5.2
Liberal Democrats	Susan Stokes	771	18.4	−6.9
English Democrat	Henry Powell	523	12.5	N/A
Labour	Margaret Cornwell	215	5.1	−10.8
Majority		1,906	45.6	+12.1
Turnout		4,186	43.1	−27.0
Conservative hold		Swing		

=== 2005 Election ===
Results of the election held on 5 May 2005:

Storrington
Party	Candidate	Votes	%	±%
Conservative	Mr F T Wilkinson	3,767	58.8	
Liberal Democrats	Mr A G Hughes	1,619	25.3	
Labour	Ms P J Banks	1,020	15.9	
Majority		2,148	33.5	
Turnout		6,406	70.1	
Conservative win (new seat)				
