= Fernhurst (electoral division) =

Coordinates: 50.98242°N 0.69695°W

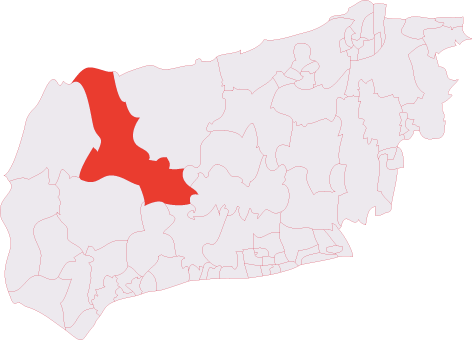
Fernhurst
Shown within West Sussex
District:	Chichester
UK Parliament Constituency:	Chichester, Arundel & South Downs
Ceremonial county:	West Sussex
Electorate (2009):	8470
County Councillor
Michael Brown (Con)

Fernhurst is an electoral division of West Sussex in the United Kingdom, and returns one member to sit on West Sussex County Council.

== Extent ==
The division is one of the largest in West Sussex and covers the villages of Barlavington, Bignor, Bury, Camelsdale, Cocking, Duncton, Easebourne, Fernhurst, Graffham, Heyshott, Linchmere, Lodsworth and Sutton.

It comprises the following Chichester District wards: Bury Ward, Easebourne Ward, Fernhurst Ward and the eastern part of Stedham Ward; and of the following civil parishes: Barlavington, Bignor, Bury, Cocking, Duncton, Easebourne, East Lavington, Fernhurst, Graffham, Heyshott, Linchmere, Lodsworth, Sutton and West Lavington.

== Election results ==
=== 2013 Election ===
Results of the election held on 2 May 2013:

Fernhurst
Party	Candidate	Votes	%	±%
Conservative	Michael Brown	1,350	51.0	−3.9
UKIP	Andrew Moncreiff	700	26.4	+8.7
Liberal Democrats	David Martin-Jenkins	339	12.8	−9.9
Labour	John Smith	259	9.8	+5.1
Majority		650	24.5	−7.7
Turnout		2,648	30.0	−12.9
Conservative hold		Swing	6.3% Con to UKIP	

=== 2009 Election ===
Results of the election held on 4 June 2009:

Fernhurst
Party	Candidate	Votes	%	±%
Conservative	Michael Brown	1,995	54.9	+2.6
Liberal Democrats	Matthew Bonfante-Horrox	825	22.7	−9.3
UKIP	Andrew Moncrieff	644	17.7	+12.6
Labour	John Smith	169	4.7	−6.0
Majority		1,170	32.2	+11.9
Turnout		3,633	42.9	−27.6
Conservative hold		Swing		
Conservative win (new seat)				

=== 2005 Election ===
Results of the election held on 5 May 2005:

Fernhurst
Party	Candidate	Votes	%	±%
Conservative	Mr T Pemberton	3,022	52.3	
Liberal Democrats	Mr K V Rowsell	1,848	32.0	
Labour	Mr B R D Hollowood	616	10.7	
UKIP	Mr D E Denny	295	5.1	
Majority		1,174	20.3	
Turnout		5,781	70.5	
