= Saltings (electoral division) =

Coordinates: 50.82871°N 0.28839°W

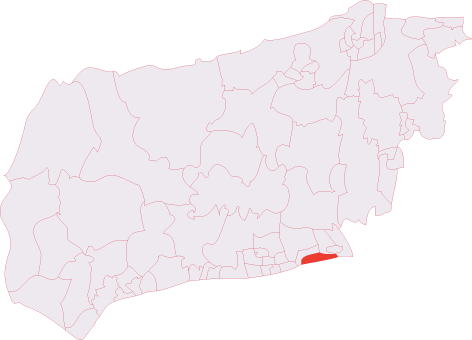
Saltings
Shown within West Sussex
District:	Adur
UK Parliament Constituency:	East Worthing & Shoreham
Ceremonial county:	West Sussex
Electorate (2013):
County Councillor
Mick Clark (UKIP)

Saltings is an electoral division of West Sussex in the United Kingdom, and returns one member to sit on West Sussex County Council.

== Extent ==
It comprises the following Adur district wards: Marine Ward and Widewater Ward. The eastern half falls within the un-parished area of Shoreham-by-Sea, while the western half lies in the southern part of Lancing civil parish.

=== 2013 Election ===
Results of the election held on 2 May 2013:

Saltings
Party	Candidate	Votes	%	±%
UKIP	Mick Clark	769	34.7	+8.9
Conservative	Dave Simmons	697	31.5	−6.6
Labour	David Devoy	328	14.8	+5.9
Green	Jennie Tindall	266	12.0	−0.1
Liberal Democrats	Doris Martin	155	7.0	−8.1
Majority		72	3.2	+3.2
Turnout		2,215	26.3	−10.9
UKIP gain from Conservative		Swing	7.7% Con to UKIP	

=== 2009 Election ===
Results of the election held on 4 June 2009:

Saltings
Party	Candidate	Votes	%	±%
Conservative	Robert Dunn	1,154	38.1	−5.2
UKIP	Mike Mendoza	781	25.8	+21.1
Liberal Democrats	Doris Martin	458	15.1	−13.2
Green	Stephen Barnes	365	12.1	+12.1
Labour	Agnes Daniel	269	8.9	−14.8
Majority		373	12.3	−2.7
Turnout		3,027	37.2	−26.2
Conservative hold		Swing		

=== 2005 Election ===
Results of the election held on 5 May 2005:

Saltings
Party	Candidate	Votes	%	±%
Conservative	Mr R B Dunn	2,106	43.3	
Liberal Democrats	Ms D G Martin	1,377	28.3	
Labour Co-op	Mr D J Yates	1,155	23.7	
UKIP	Mr D M Pledge	227	4.7	
Majority		729	15.0	
Turnout		4,865	63.4	
Conservative win (new seat)				
