= Imberdown (electoral division) =

Coordinates: 51.13089°N 0.06351°W

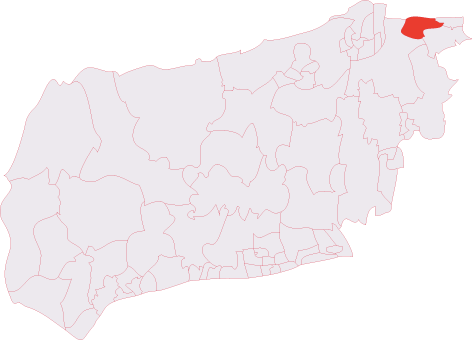
Imberdown
Shown within West Sussex
District:	Mid Sussex
UK Parliament Constituency:	Mid Sussex, Horsham
Ceremonial county:	West Sussex
Electorate (2009):	8093
County Councillor
Heidi Brunsdon (Con)

Imberdown is an electoral division of West Sussex in the United Kingdom, and returns one member to sit on West Sussex County Council.

== Extent ==
The division covers the western part of the town of East Grinstead and the village of Crawley Down.

It comprises the following Mid Sussex District wards: the northern part of Crawley Down & Turners Hill Ward and East Grinstead Imberhorne Ward; and of the following civil parishes: the northwestern part of East Grinstead, and the eastern part of Worth.

== Election results ==
=== 2021 Election ===
Results of the election held on 8 May 2021:

Imberdown
Party	Candidate	Votes	%	±%
Independent	Ian P Gibson	1843	53%	+21
Conservative	Norman Webster	1286	37%	−11
Labour	Daniel Everett	316	9%	+2
The for Britain Movement	Barry Noldart	25	1%	+1
Majority		557	16	
Turnout		3480		
Independent gain from Conservative		Swing	16	

=== 2017 Election ===
Results of the election held on 4 May 2017:

Imberdown
Party	Candidate	Votes	%	±%
Conservative	Heidi Brunsdon	1476	48	+5
Independent	Ian P Gibson	988	32	+32
Liberal Democrats	G E Knight	215	7	−17
Labour	D M B Miles	188	6	+6
UKIP	B J Bezzant	115	4	−28
Green	J G Morgan	104	3	+3
Majority				
Turnout		3086	34.96	
Conservative hold		Swing		

=== 2013 Election ===
Results of the election held on 2 May 2013:

Imberdown
Party	Candidate	Votes	%	±%
Conservative	Heidi Brunsdon	1,065	43.2	+3.5
UKIP	Kevin Lindsay	799	32.4	+20.5
Liberal Democrats	Bob Mainstone	599	24.3	−19.8
Majority		266	10.8	
Turnout		2,463	29.9	−12.7
Conservative hold		Swing		

=== 2009 Election ===
Results of the election held on 4 June 2009:

Imberdown
Party	Candidate	Votes	%	±%
Liberal Democrats	Heidi Brunsdon	1,522	44.1	+19.0
Conservative	Phillip Coote	1,370	39.7	−8.8
UKIP	Eric Saunders	412	11.9	N/A
Labour	Alison Cornell	144	4.2	−6.9
Majority		152	4.4	
Turnout		3,448	42.6	−29.3
Liberal Democrats gain from Conservative		Swing		

=== 2005 Election ===
Results of the election held on 5 May 2005:

Imberdown
Party	Candidate	Votes	%	±%
Conservative	Mr P A C Coote	2,533	48.5	
Liberal Democrats	Mr E A Matthews	1,312	25.1	
Green	Ms C W Edminson	805	15.4	
Labour	Mr M Briggs	578	11.1	
Majority		1,221	23.4	
Turnout		5,228	71.9	
Conservative win (new seat)				
