= Southwater & Nuthurst (electoral division) =

Coordinates: 51.03038°N 0.29766°W

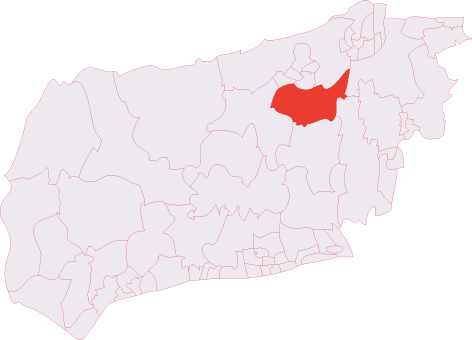
Southwater & Nuthurst
Shown within West Sussex
District:	Horsham
UK Parliament Constituency:	Horsham
Ceremonial county:	West Sussex
Electorate (2009):	9644
County Councillor
Brad Watson (Con)

Southwater & Nuthurst is an electoral division of West Sussex in the United Kingdom and returns one member to sit on West Sussex County Council. The current County Councillor, Brad Watson, is also Cabinet Member for Communications.

== Extent ==
The division covers the villages of Copsale, Crabtree, Lower Beeding, Mannings Heath, Maplehurst, Nuthurst and Southwater.

It comprises the following Horsham District wards: Nuthurst Ward and Southwater Ward; and of the following civil parishes: Lower Beeding, Nuthurst and Southwater.

== Election results ==
=== 2013 Election ===
Results of the election held on 2 May 2013:

Southwater & Nuthurst
Party	Candidate	Votes	%	±%
Conservative	Brad Watson	1,263	41.4	−8.2
UKIP	Stuart Aldridge	1,094	35.8	+22.5
Liberal Democrats	Peter Stainton	492	16.1	−11.4
Labour	Jacqueline Little	203	6.7	+3.8
Majority		169	5.6	−16.5
Turnout		3,052	30.4	−6.1
Conservative hold		Swing		

=== 2009 Election ===
Results of the election held on 4 June 2009:

Southwater & Nuthurst
Party	Candidate	Votes	%	±%
Conservative	Brad Watson	1,934	49.6	+1.2
Liberal Democrats	Peter Stainton	1,075	27.5	−13.8
UKIP	Harry Aldrige	519	13.3	N/A
Green	Tristan Loraine	261	6.7	N/A
Labour	Jane Field	113	2.9	−7.3
Majority		859	22.1	+15.0
Turnout		3,902	40.5	−28.5
Conservative hold		Swing		

=== 2005 Election ===
Results of the election held on 5 May 2005:

Southwater & Nuthurst
Party	Candidate	Votes	%	±%
Conservative	Mr B Watson	3,057	48.4	
Liberal Democrats	Mr P J Stainton	2,608	41.3	
Labour	Mr T C Parker	646	10.2	
Majority		449	7.1	
Turnout		6,311	69.0	
Conservative win (new seat)				
