= Lindfield & High Weald (electoral division) =

Coordinates: 51.04183°N 0.04086°W

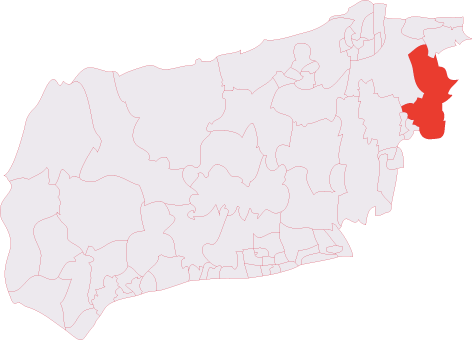
Lindfield & High Weald
Shown within West Sussex
District:	Mid Sussex
UK Parliament Constituency:	Mid Sussex
Ceremonial county:	West Sussex
Electorate (2009):	9455
County Councillor
Christine Field (Con)

Lindfield & High Weald is an electoral division of West Sussex in the United Kingdom, and returns one member to sit on West Sussex County Council.

== Extent ==
The division covers the villages of Horsted Keynes, Lindfield, Scaynes Hill, Sharpthorne and West Hoathly.

It comprises the following Mid Sussex District wards: High Weald Ward and Lindfield Ward; and the following civil parishes: Horsted Keynes, Lindfield, Lindfield Rural and West Hoathly.

== Election results ==
=== 2013 Election ===
Results of the election held on 2 May 2013:

Lindfield & High Weald
Party	Candidate	Votes	%	±%
Conservative	Christine Field	1,633	49.2	−8.6
UKIP	Lesley Montgomery	662	19.9	N/A
Green	Paul Brown	500	15.1	−1.3
Liberal Democrats	Anne-Marie Lucraft	281	8.5	−13.6
Labour	Michael Amor	245	7.4	+3.8
Majority		971	29.3	−6.5
Turnout		3,321	35.1	−11.9
Conservative hold		Swing		

=== 2009 Election ===
Results of the election held on 4 June 2009:

Lindfield & High Weald
Party	Candidate	Votes	%	±%
Conservative	Christine Field	2,573	57.9	+5.9
Liberal Democrats	Anne-Marie Lucraft	983	22.1	−7.6
Green	Peter Wemyss-Gorman	728	16.4	+7.0
Labour	Alan Yates	158	3.6	−5.3
Majority		1,590	35.8	+13.5
Turnout		4,442	47.0	−26.5
Conservative hold		Swing		

=== 2005 Election ===
Results of the election held on 5 May 2005:

Lindfield & High Weald
Party	Candidate	Votes	%	±%
Conservative	Mrs M D Johnson	3,586	52.0	
Liberal Democrats	Ms A Lucraft	2,045	29.7	
Green	Mr P E M Brown	646	9.4	
Labour	Mr J M Crawford	613	8.9	
Majority		1,514	22.3	
Turnout		6,890	73.5	
Conservative win (new seat)				
