= Chichester South (electoral division) =

Electoral division of West Sussex, England

Coordinates: 50.79313°N 0.79445°W

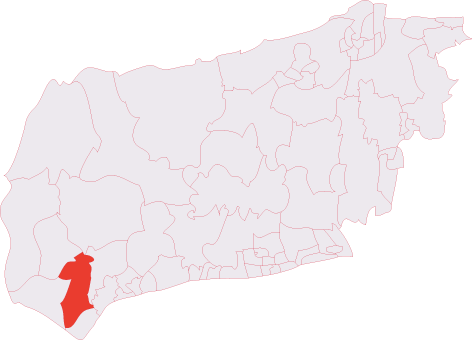
Chichester South
Shown within West Sussex
District:	Chichester
UK Parliament Constituency:	Chichester
Ceremonial county:	West Sussex
Electorate (2009):	9007
County Councillor
Margaret Whitehead (Con)

Chichester South is an electoral division of West Sussex in the United Kingdom, and returns one member to sit on West Sussex County Council.

== Extent ==
The division covers the southern part of the town of Chichester; and the villages of Apuldram, Donnington, Highleigh, Hunston and Sidlesham.

It comprises the following Chichester District wards: Chichester South Ward, Donnington Ward and Sidlesham Ward; and of the following civil parishes: Appledram, the southern part of Chichester, Donnington, Hunston, North Mundham and Sidlesham.

== Election results ==
=== 2013 Election ===
Results of the election held on 2 May 2013:

Chichester South
Party	Candidate	Votes	%	±%
Conservative	Margaret Whitehead	1,024	40.1	−2.8
UKIP	Nigel Sitwell	672	26.3	+8.7
Liberal Democrats	Michael Woolley	508	19.9	−12.4
Labour	James Hobson	348	13.6	+6.3
Majority		352	13.8	+3.2
Turnout		2,552	27.6	−9.1
Conservative hold		Swing	5.8% Con to UKIP	

=== 2009 Election ===
Results of the election held on 4 June 2009:

Chichester South
Party	Candidate	Votes	%	±%
Conservative	Margaret Whitehead	1,419	42.9	+6.2
Liberal Democrats	Alan Chaplin	1,068	32.3	−8.2
UKIP	Nigel Sitwell	581	17.6	+10.9
Labour	Wendy Pengelly	241	7.3	−8.8
Majority		351	10.6	+10.6
Turnout		3,309	36.7	−28.6
Conservative gain from Liberal Democrats		Swing		

=== 2005 Election ===
Results of the election held on 5 May 2005:

Chichester South
Party	Candidate	Votes	%	±%
Liberal Democrats	Mr A D Chaplin	2,244	40.5	
Conservative	Mr A P Dignum	2,034	36.7	
Labour	Mr M J Few	891	16.1	
UKIP	Mr N D W Sitwell	374	6.7	
Majority		210	3.8	
Turnout		5,543	65.3	
Liberal Democrats win (new seat)				
