= Petworth (electoral division) =

Coordinates: 51.02542°N 0.58605°W

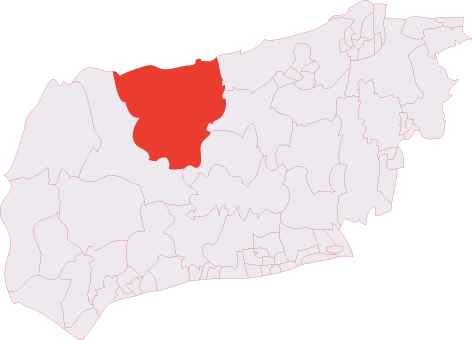
Petworth
Shown within West Sussex
District:	Chichester
UK Parliament Constituency:	Chichester, Horsham
Ceremonial county:	West Sussex
Electorate (2009):	9585
County Councillor
Janet Duncton (Con)

Petworth is an electoral division of West Sussex in the United Kingdom, and returns one member to sit on West Sussex County Council.

== Extent ==
The division is one of the largest in West Sussex and covers the town of Petworth; and the villages of Byworth, Fittleworth, Ifold, Kirdford, Loxwood, Lurgashall, Northchapel, Plaistow, Stopham, Tillington, Upperton and Wisborough Green.

It comprises the following Chichester District wards: Petworth Ward, Plaistow Ward and Wisborough Green Ward; and of the following civil parishes: Ebernoe, Fittleworth, Kirdford, Loxwood, Lurgashall, Northchapel, Petworth, Plaistow, Stopham, Tillington and Wisborough Green.

== Election results ==
=== 2017 Election ===
Results of the election held on 4 May 2017:

Petworth
Party	Candidate	Votes	%	±%
Conservative	Janet Elizabeth Duncton	2,568		
Liberal Democrats	Natalie Cecilia Hume	592		
UKIP	Jeannie Dunning	166		
Independent	Andrew William Young	130		
Majority				
Turnout				
Conservative hold		Swing		

=== 2013 Election ===
Results of the election held on 2 May 2013:

Petworth
Party	Candidate	Votes	%	±%
Conservative	Janet Duncton	1,703	54.8	−15.5
UKIP	Julian Batchelor	809	26.0	N/A
Liberal Democrats	Karon Read	394	12.7	−7.9
Labour	Philip Robinson	201	6.5	+2.7
Majority		894	28.8	−20.9
Turnout		3,107	31.7	−9.6
Conservative hold		Swing		

=== 2009 Election ===
Results of the election held on 4 June 2009:

Petworth
Party	Candidate	Votes	%	±%
Conservative	Chris Duncton	2,769	70.3	−1.7
Liberal Democrats	Raymond Cooper	810	20.6	+3.3
BNP	Robert Trower	209	5.3	−5.4
Labour	Brenda Wise	148	3.8	N/A
Majority		1,959	49.7	−5.0
Turnout		3,939	41.1	+20.0
Conservative hold		Swing		

=== 2007 Bye-election ===
Results of the by-election held on 7 June 2007:

Petworth
Party	Candidate	Votes	%	±%
Conservative	Chris Duncton	1,437	72.0	+17.8
Liberal Democrats	Raymond Cooper	346	17.3	−13
BNP	Andrew Emerson	213	10.7	N/A
Majority		1,091	54.7	+30.8
Turnout		2,002	21.12	−48.60
Conservative hold		Swing		

=== 2005 Election ===
Results of the election held on 5 May 2005:

Petworth
Party	Candidate	Votes	%	±%
Conservative	Mr P W J Moffatt	3,524	54.2	
Liberal Democrats	Mr R Cooper	1,968	30.3	
Labour	Ms J Miller	651	10.0	
UKIP	Ms V A Moran	354	5.4	
Majority		1,556	23.9	
Turnout		6,497	69.7	
Conservative win (new seat)				
