= Bramber Castle (electoral division) =

Electoral division of West Sussex, England

Coordinates: 50.89047°N 0.30487°W

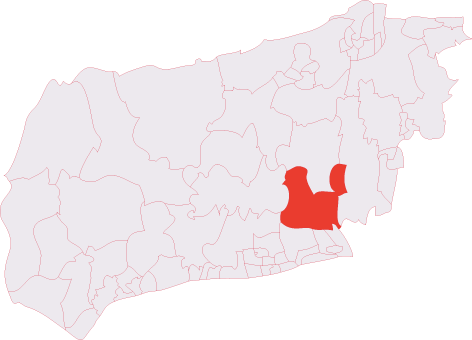
Bramber Castle
Shown within West Sussex
District:	Horsham
UK Parliament Constituency:	Arundel & South Downs
Ceremonial county:	West Sussex
Electorate (2009):	9089
County Councillor
David Barling (Con)

Bramber Castle is an electoral division of West Sussex in the United Kingdom and returns one member to sit on West Sussex County Council.

== Extent ==
The division covers the town of Steyning; and the villages of Ashurst, Botolphs, Bramber, Edburton, Small Dole, Upper Beeding and Woodmancote.

It comprises the following Horsham District wards: Bramber, Upper Beeding & Woodmancote Ward and Steyning Ward; and of the following civil parishes: Ashurst, Bramber, the southern part of Henfield, Steyning, Upper Beeding and Woodmancote.

== Election results ==
=== 2013 Election ===
Results of the election held on 2 May 2013:

Bramber Castle
Party	Candidate	Votes	%	±%
Conservative	David Barling	1,322	42.3	+6.1
Liberal Democrats	Jessica Sproxton-Miller	848	27.1	−21.7
UKIP	Mike Grizzard	670	21.4	+13.8
Labour	Adrian Norridge	288	9.2	+6.7
Majority		474	15.2	
Turnout		3,128	34.2	−16.6
Conservative gain from Liberal Democrats		Swing	13.9% LD to Con	

=== 2009 Election ===
Results of the election held on 4 June 2009:

Bramber Castle
Party	Candidate	Votes	%	±%
Liberal Democrats	Derek Deedman	2,252	48.8	0.0
Conservative	David Barling	1,669	36.2	−3.3
UKIP	Stuart Bower	351	7.6	N/A
BNP	Donna Bailey	226	4.9	N/A
Labour	Arleene Piercy	117	2.5	−9.3
Majority		583	12.6	+3.3
Turnout		4,615	50.8	−19.6
Liberal Democrats hold		Swing		

=== 2005 Election ===
Results of the election held on 5 May 2005:

Bramber Castle
Party	Candidate	Votes	%	±%
Liberal Democrats	Mr D R Deedman	3,056	48.8	
Conservative	Mr A N Whall	2,473	39.5	
Labour	Mr P Hilditch	737	11.8	
Majority		583	9.3	
Turnout		6,266	70.4	
Liberal Democrats win (new seat)				
