= Selsey (electoral division) =

Coordinates: 50.74417°N 0.78020°W

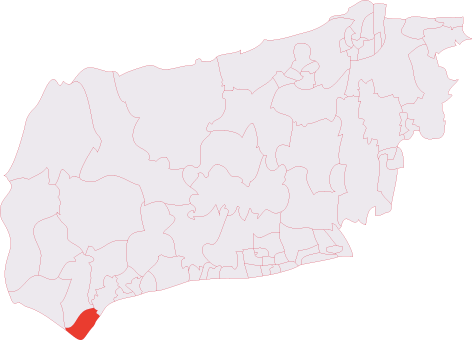
Selsey
Shown within West Sussex
District:	Chichester
UK Parliament Constituency:	Chichester
Ceremonial county:	West Sussex
Electorate (2009):	8849
County Councillor
Bernard Smith (UKIP)

Selsey is an electoral division of West Sussex in the United Kingdom and returns one member to sit on West Sussex County Council.

== Extent ==
The division covers the town of Selsey, and the hamlet of Church Norton.

It comprises the following Chichester District wards: Selsey North Ward and Selsey South Ward; the electoral division is co-terminous with the civil parish of Selsey.

== Election results ==
=== 2013 Election ===
Results of the election held on 2 May 2013:

Selsey
Party	Candidate	Votes	%	±%
UKIP	Bernard Smith	1,201	45.8	+5.8
Conservative	Roland O'Brien	1,091	41.6	−5.5
Labour	Ian Bell	332	12.7	−0.1
Majority		110	4.2	N/A
Turnout		2,624	29.9	−6.7
UKIP gain from Conservative		Swing	5.7% Con to UKIP	

=== 2009 Election ===
Results of the election held on 4 June 2009:

Selsey
Party	Candidate	Votes	%	±%
Conservative	Peter Jones	1,525	47.1	+6.9
UKIP	Bernard Smith	1,295	40.0	+28.7
Labour	Ian Bell	415	12.8	−9.8
Majority		230	7.1	−7.2
Turnout		3,235	36.6	−28.0
Conservative hold		Swing		

=== 2005 Election ===
Results of the election held on 5 May 2005:

Selsey
Party	Candidate	Votes	%	±%
Conservative	Mr P E Jones	2,155	40.2	
Liberal Democrats	Mr J E Shade	1,386	25.9	
Labour	Ms M M Lawson	1,214	22.6	
UKIP	Mr B A Smith	605	11.3	
Majority		769	14.3	
Turnout		5,360	64.6	
Conservative win (new seat)				
