= Worthing Pier (electoral division) =

Coordinates: 50.81239°N 0.37877°W

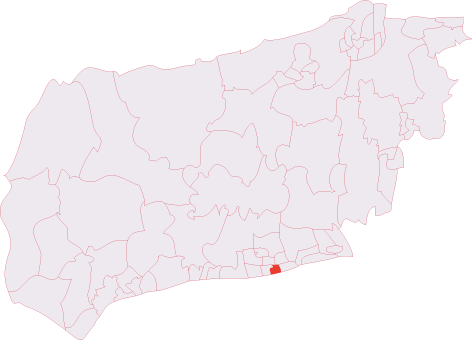
Worthing Pier
Shown within West Sussex
| District: | Worthing |
| UK Parliament Constituency: | Worthing West |
| Ceremonial county: | West Sussex |
| Electorate (2009): | 8547 |
County Councillor
Michael Cloake (Con)

Worthing Pier is an electoral division of West Sussex in the United Kingdom, and returns one member to sit on West Sussex County Council.

== Extent ==
The division covers the centre of the town of Worthing.

It falls entirely within the un-parished area of Worthing Borough and comprises the following borough wards: the west part of Central Ward, and the south part of Heene Ward.

== Election results ==
=== 2013 election ===
Results of the election held on 2 May 2013:

Worthing Pier
| Party | Candidate | Votes | % | ±% |
|---|---|---|---|---|
| Conservative | Michael Cloake | 660 | 29.1 | −8.0 |
| Green | James Doyle | 514 | 22.6 | N/A |
| UKIP | Christopher Woodward | 475 | 20.9 | +8.1 |
| Liberal Democrats | Hazel Thorpe | 340 | 15.0 | −25.1 |
| Labour | Peter Barnes | 282 | 12.4 | +5.8 |
| Majority | | 146 | 6.5 | |
| Turnout | | 2,271 | 24.5 | −7.5 |
| Conservative gain from Green | | Swing | | |

=== 2009 election ===
Results of the election held on 4 June 2009:

Worthing Pier
| Party | Candidate | Votes | % | ±% |
|---|---|---|---|---|
| Liberal Democrats | James Doyle | 1,097 | 40.1 | +5.6 |
| Conservative | Paul Yallop | 1,015 | 37.1 | −3.3 |
| UKIP | Christopher Woodward | 350 | 12.8 | N/A |
| Labour | Sue Marsh | 181 | 6.6 | −10.1 |
| English Democrat | Michael Black-Feather | 93 | 3.4 | N/A |
| Majority | | 82 | 3.0 | |
| Turnout | | 2,736 | 32.0 | −20.5 |
| Liberal Democrats gain from Conservative | | Swing | | |

=== 2005 election ===
Results of the election held on 5 May 2005

Worthing Pier
| Party | Candidate | Votes | % | ±% |
|---|---|---|---|---|
| Conservative | Mr C B Roberts | 1,678 | 40.4 | |
| Liberal Democrats | Ms C B Brown | 1,434 | 34.5 | |
| Labour | Mr P H Barnes | 694 | 16.7 | |
| Green | Mr D H Colkett | 351 | 8.4 | |
| Majority | | 244 | 5.9 | |
| Turnout | | 4,157 | 52.5 | |
| Conservative win (new seat) | | | | |
