= Worth Forest (electoral division) =

Coordinates: 51.08390°N 0.13252°W

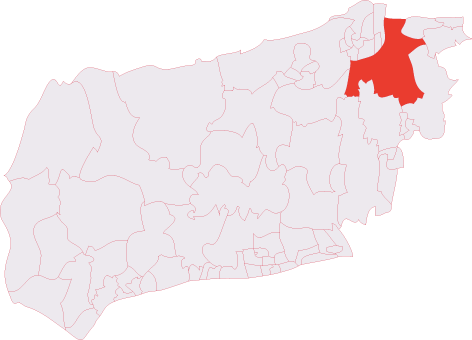
Worth Forest
Shown within West Sussex
District:	Mid Sussex
UK Parliament Constituency:	Horsham, Mid Sussex
Ceremonial county:	West Sussex
Electorate (2009):	9356
County Councillor
Bill Acraman (Con)

Worth Forest is an electoral division of West Sussex in the United Kingdom, and returns one member to sit on West Sussex County Council.

== Extent ==
The division covers the villages of Ardingly, Balcombe, Copthorne, Handcross, Pease Pottage and Turners Hill.

It comprises the following Mid Sussex District wards: Ardingly & Balcombe Ward, Copthorne & Worth Ward, and the south part of Crawley Down & Turners Hill Ward; and the following civil parishes: Ardingly, Balcombe, the north part of Slaugham, Turners Hill and the west part of Worth.

== Election results ==
=== 2013 Election ===
Results of the election held on 2 May 2013:

Worth Forest
Party	Candidate	Votes	%	±%
Conservative	Bill Acraman	1,200	44.1	−17.1
UKIP	Vivienne Etherton	815	30.0	N/A
Labour	Alan Rew	338	12.4	+6.0
Green	Gillian Maher	198	7.3	−7.5
Liberal Democrats	Nicholas Dennis	168	6.2	−11.4
Majority		385	14.1	−29.5
Turnout		2,719	29.1	−8.4
Conservative hold		Swing		

=== 2009 Election ===
Results of the election held on 4 June 2009:

Worth Forest
Party	Candidate	Votes	%	±%
Conservative	Bill Acraman	2,147	61.2	+7.8
Liberal Democrats	Nick Dennis	617	17.6	−4.5
Green	Barrie Weller	518	14.8	+7.3
Labour	Frank Thomson	225	6.4	−10.6
Majority		1,530	43.6	+12.3
Turnout		3,507	37.5	−31.0
Conservative hold		Swing		

=== 2005 Election ===
Results of the election held on 5 May 2005:

Worth Forest
Party	Candidate	Votes	%	±%
Conservative	Mr W E Acraman	3,208	53.4	
Liberal Democrats	Mr G E Knight	1,327	22.1	
Labour	Mr R M Burgess	1,025	17.0	
Green	Mr M B Weller	452	7.5	
Majority		1,881	31.3	
Turnout		6,012	68.5	
Conservative win (new seat)				
