= Kingston Buci (electoral division) =

Coordinates: 50.83690°N 0.25380°W

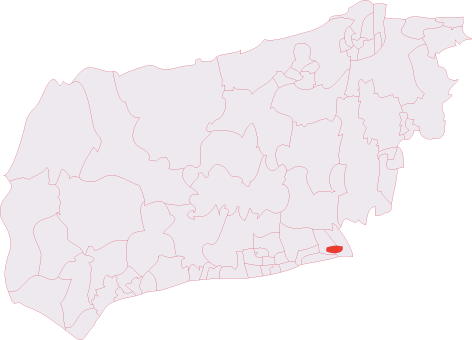
Kingston Buci
Shown within West Sussex
District:	Adur
UK Parliament Constituency:	East Worthing & Shoreham
Ceremonial county:	West Sussex
Electorate (2009):	7436
County Councillor
Peter Metcalf (Con)

Kingston Buci was an electoral division of West Sussex in the United Kingdom, and returned one member to sit on West Sussex County Council. It was abolished as a result of boundary changes for the 2017 election.

== Extent and History ==
The division covers the neighbourhood of Kingston-by-Sea, which forms part of the town of Shoreham-by-Sea. The seat has been won by the Conservative Party at each election held since the seat was created in 2004. In April 2013 Paul Graysmark defected from the Conservative Party to UKIP, making the defence in 2013 a defence for UKIP.

It falls entirely within the un-parished area of Shoreham-by-Sea and comprises the following district wards: the north part of St. Mary's Ward, Southlands Ward and the north part of Southwick Green Ward.

== Election results ==
=== 2013 Election ===
Results of the election held on 2 May 2013:

Kingston Buci
Party	Candidate	Votes	%	±%
Conservative	Peter Metcalf	823	35.9	−9.9
UKIP	Paul Graysmark	747	32.6	+11.4
Labour	Sami Zeglam	443	19.3	+2.0
Green	Helen Mears	173	7.6	+7.6
Liberal Democrats	Cyril Cannings	115	5.0	−10.7
Majority		76	2.7	−21.9
Turnout		2,291	29.7	−5.4
Conservative gain from UKIP		Swing		

=== 2009 Election ===
The results of the election held on 4 June 2009:

Kingston Buci
Party	Candidate	Votes	%	±%
Conservative	Paul Graysmark	1,198	45.8	+8.9
UKIP	Michael Henn	554	21.2	+15.6
Labour	Andy Bray	452	17.3	−11.7
Liberal Democrats	Patricia Izod	409	15.7	−7.8
Majority		644	24.6	+16.7
Turnout		2,613	35.14	−26.8
Conservative hold		Swing		

=== 2005 Election ===
Results of the election held on 5 May 2005:

Kingston Buci
Party	Candidate	Votes	%	±%
Conservative	Paul Graysmark	1,674	36.9	
Labour Co-op	Andrew Bray	1,315	29.0	
Liberal Democrats	Janet Goldsbrough-Jones	1,065	23.5	
UKIP	M Henn	256	5.6	
Green	V Tilsley	227	5.0	
Majority		359	7.9	
Turnout		4,537	61.9	
Conservative win (new seat)				
