= Pulborough (electoral division) =

Coordinates: 50.96535°N 0.47413°W

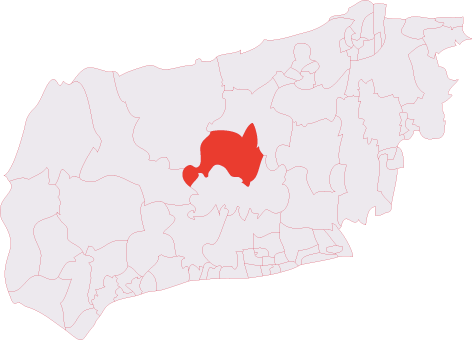
Pulborough
Shown within West Sussex
District:	Horsham
UK Parliament Constituency:	Arundel and South Downs
Ceremonial county:	West Sussex
Electorate (2009):	9221
County Councillor
Pat Arculus (Con)

Pulborough is an electoral division of West Sussex in the United Kingdom and returns one member to sit on West Sussex County Council. The current County Councillor, Pat Arculus, is also Cabinet Member for Children and Young People's Services.

== Extent ==
The division covers the villages of Coldwaltham, Hardham, Nutbourne, Pulborough, Thakeham, West Chiltington and West Chiltington Common.

It comprises the following Horsham District wards: Chanctonbury Ward and Pulborough & Coldwaltham Ward; and of the following civil parishes: Coldwaltham, Pulborough, Thakeham and West Chiltington.

== Election results ==
=== 2013 Election ===
Results of the election held on 2 May 2013:

Pulborough
Party	Candidate	Votes	%	±%
Conservative	Pat Arculus	1,380	43.7	−29.5
UKIP	John Wallace	1,159	36.7	N/A
Independent	Tom Williams	286	9.1	N/A
Liberal Democrats	Rosalyn Deedman	175	5.5	−15.6
Labour	Antony Bignell	159	5.0	−0.7
Majority		221	7.0	−45.1
Turnout		3,159	32.7	−9.8
Conservative hold		Swing		

=== 2009 Election ===
Results of the election held on 4 June 2009:

Pulborough
Party	Candidate	Votes	%	±%
Conservative	Pat Arculus	2,871	73.2	+9.5
Liberal Democrats	Rosalyn Deedman	829	21.1	−15.2
Labour	Anthony Bignell	222	5.7	N/A
Majority		2,042	52.1	+24.7
Turnout		3,922	42.5	−25.7
Conservative hold		Swing		

=== 2005 Election ===
Results of the election held on 5 May 2005:

Pulborough
Party	Candidate	Votes	%	±%
Conservative	Mrs P A C Arculus	3,826	63.7	
Liberal Democrats	Mr D B C Wright	2,177	36.3	
Majority		1,649	27.4	
Turnout		6,003	68.2	
Conservative win (new seat)				
