= Hurstpierpoint & Bolney (electoral division) =

Electoral division of West Sussex, UK

Coordinates: 50.95605°N 0.19329°W

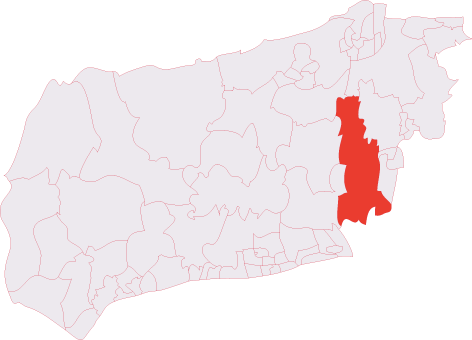
Hurstpierpoint & Bolney
Shown within West Sussex
District:	Mid Sussex
UK Parliament Constituency:	Arundel & South Downs, Horsham
Ceremonial County:	West Sussex
Electorate (2009):	7833
County Councillor
Joy Dennis (Con)

Hurstpierpoint & Bolney is an electoral division of West Sussex in the United Kingdom, and returns one member to sit on West Sussex County Council.

== Extent ==
The division is one of the largest in West Sussex, covering the villages of Albourne, Bolney, Fulking, Hickstead, Hurst Wickham, Hurstpierpoint, Newtimber, Poynings, Pyecombe, Sayers Common, Slaugham and Warninglid.

It comprises the following Mid Sussex District wards: Bolney Ward and Hurstpierpoint & Downs Ward; and of the following civil parishes: Albourne, Bolney, Fulking, Hurstpierpoint & Sayers Common, Newtimber, Poynings, Pyecombe, the southern part of Slaugham, and Twineham.

== Election results ==
=== 2017 Election ===
Results of the election held on 4 May 2017:

Hurstpierpoint & Bolney
Party	Candidate	Votes	%	±%
Conservative	Joy Dennis	1,821		
Liberal Democrats	Alison Bennett	982		
Labour	Norina O'Hare	396		
Green	Mike Airey	280		
UKIP	Peter Hopgood	142		
Monster Raving Loony	Baron Von Thunderclap	41		
Majority		839		
Turnout		3,662		
Conservative hold		Swing		

=== 2013 Election ===
Results of the election held on 2 May 2013:

Hurstpierpoint & Bolney
Party	Candidate	Votes	%	±%
Conservative	Peter Griffiths	1,275	49.1	−9.3
UKIP	Ian Holt	487	18.8	N/A
Liberal Democrats	Rodney Jackson	341	13.1	−7.7
Green	Mike Airey	285	11.0	−4.1
Labour	David Chalkley	209	8.0	+2.3
Majority		788	30.3	−7.3
Turnout		2,597	32.9	−11.7
Conservative hold		Swing		

=== 2009 Election ===
Results of the election held on 4 June 2009:

Hurstpierpoint & Bolney
Party	Candidate	Votes	%	±%
Conservative	Peter Griffiths	2,038	58.4	+4.6
Liberal Democrats	Rodney Jackson	727	20.8	−7.5
Green	Mike Airey	529	15.1	N/A
Labour	Ann Morgan	198	5.7	−8.5
Majority		1,311	37.6	+12.1
Turnout		3,492	44.6	−26.1
Conservative hold		Swing		

=== 2005 Election ===
Results of the election held on 5 May 2005:

Hurstpierpoint & Bolney
Party	Candidate	Votes	%	±%
Conservative	Mr P A D Griffiths	2,816	53.8	
Liberal Democrats	Mr N C S Cook	1,479	28.3	
Labour	Mr M P Uhlhorn	745	14.2	
Monster Raving Loony	Mr P B Berry	192	3.7	
Majority		1,337	25.5	
Turnout		5,232	70.7	
Conservative win (new seat)				
