= Broadfield (electoral division) =

Coordinates: 51.09662°N 0.20599°W

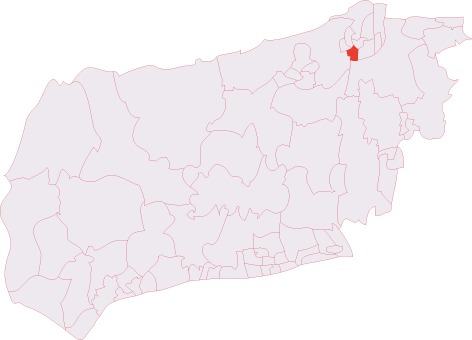
Broadfield
Shown within West Sussex
District:	Crawley
UK Parliament Constituency:	Crawley
Ceremonial county:	West Sussex
Electorate (2009):	8698
County Councillor
Brian Quinn (Lab)

Broadfield also known as Lowest Pease Pottage is an electoral division of West Sussex in the United Kingdom, and returns one member to sit on West Sussex County Council.

== Extent ==
The division covers the Broadfield neighbourhood area of the town of Crawley.

It falls entirely within the un-parished area of Crawley Borough and comprises the following borough wards: Broadfield North Ward and Broadfield South Ward.

== Election results ==
=== 2013 Election ===
Results of the election held on 2 May 2013:

Broadfield
Party	Candidate	Votes	%	±%
Labour	Brian Quinn	1,084	50.5	+8.7
Conservative	Lee Gilroy	494	23.0	−35.2
UKIP	Mia Bristow	476	22.2	N/A
Liberal Democrats	Keith Sunderland	51	2.4	N/A
Socialist Labour	Derek Isaacs	42	2.0	N/A
Majority		590	27.5	N/A
Turnout		2,147	23.3	−3.6
Labour gain from Conservative		Swing	22.0% Con to Lab	

=== 2009 Election ===
Results of the election held on 4 June 2009:

Broadfield
Party	Candidate	Votes	%	±%
Conservative	Alan Quirk	1,367	58.2	+26.6
Labour	Gillian Joyce	983	41.8	−3.7
Majority		384	16.4	N/A
Turnout		2,350	27.0	−22.2
Conservative gain from Labour		Swing		

=== 2005 Election ===
Results of the election held on 5 May 2005:

Broadfield
Party	Candidate	Votes	%	±%
Labour	J McGough	1,861	45.5	
Conservative	M T Head	1,291	31.6	
Liberal Democrats	M R Scott	723	17.7	
UKIP	D A Hardman	212	5.2	
Majority		570	13.9	
Turnout		4,087	49.2	
Labour win (new seat)				
