= Shoreham (electoral division) =

Coordinates: 50.84746°N 0.27517°W

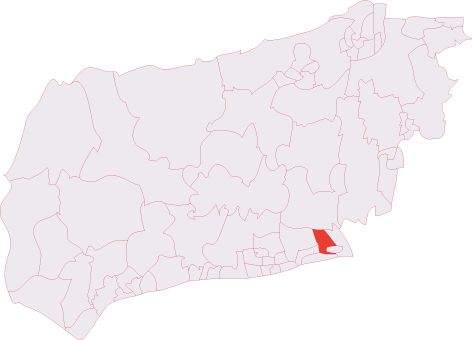
Shoreham
Shown within West Sussex
District:	Adur
UK Parliament Constituency:	East Worthing & Shoreham
Ceremonial county:	West Sussex
Electorate (2009):	7439
County Councillor
Debbie Kennard (Con)

Shoreham is an electoral division of West Sussex in the United Kingdom, and returns one member to sit on West Sussex County Council.

== Extent ==
The division covers the town of Shoreham-by-Sea including the neighbourhoods of New Shoreham and Old Shoreham.

It comprises the following Adur district wards: Buckingham Ward, the south part of St. Mary's Ward and St. Nicolas Ward. It falls entirely within the un-parished area of Shoreham-by-Sea.

== Election results ==
=== 2013 Election ===
Results of the election held on 2 May 2013:

Shoreham
Party	Candidate	Votes	%	±%
Conservative	Debbie Kennard	1,037	46.3	−2.8
UKIP	Clive Burghard	507	22.6	+9.2
Labour	Irene Reed	321	14.3	+5.6
Green	Lynn Finnigan	232	10.4	−5.9
Liberal Democrats	John Hilditch	142	6.3	−6.2
Majority		530	23.7	−9.1
Turnout		2,239	29.5	−3.3
Conservative hold		Swing		

=== 2009 Election ===
Results of the election held on 4 June 2009:

Shoreham
Party	Candidate	Votes	%	±%
Conservative	Brian Coomber	1,453	49.1	+2.0
Green	Moyra Martin	483	16.3	+7.7
UKIP	Brian Elliott	396	13.4	+9.4
Liberal Democrats	Cyril Cannings	370	12.5	−8.6
Labour	Ricky Daniel	256	8.7	−10.6
Majority		970	32.8	+6.8
Turnout		2,958	39.8	−30.2
Conservative hold		Swing		

=== 2005 Election ===
Results of the election held on 5 May 2005:

Shoreham
Party	Candidate	Votes	%	±%
Conservative	Mr C R Williams	2,359	47.1	
Liberal Democrats	Mr A C Stuart	1,055	21.1	
Labour Co-op	Mr N R Sweet	965	19.3	
Green	Ms M A Martin	430	8.6	
UKIP	Mr P R Drayton-Morris	202	4.0	
Majority		1,304	26.0	
Turnout		5,011	70.0	
Conservative win (new seat)				
