= Sompting & North Lancing (electoral division) =

Electoral division in West Sussex, England

Coordinates: 50.84974°N 0.33259°W

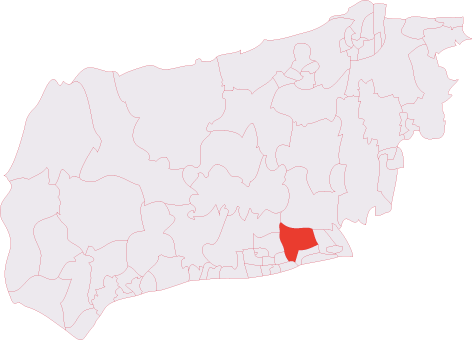
Sompting & North Lancing
Shown within West Sussex
| District: | Adur |
| UK Parliament Constituency: | East Worthing & Shoreham |
| Ceremonial county: | West Sussex |
| Electorate (2009): | 8609 |
County Councillor
George Barton (Conservative)

Sompting & North Lancing is an electoral division of West Sussex in the United Kingdom, and returns one member to sit on the West Sussex County Council.

== Extent ==
The division covers the neighbourhoods of North Lancing and Sompting, and the hamlets of Coombes and Sompting Abbotts. It also includes Lancing College.

It comprises the following Adur district wards: Cokeham Ward, the north part of Manor Ward, and Peverel Ward; and the following civil parishes: Coombes, the north part of Lancing, and Sompting.

=== 2013 Election ===
Results of the election held on 2 May 2013:

Sompting & North Lancing
| Party | Candidate | Votes | % | ±% |
|---|---|---|---|---|
| UKIP | Lionel Parsons | 1,144 | 45.5 | +20.9 |
| Conservative | Carson Albury | 773 | 30.7 | −14.6 |
| Labour | Alun Jones | 368 | 14.6 | +2.4 |
| Green | Simon Williams | 124 | 4.9 | +4.9 |
| Liberal Democrats | Patricia Izod | 107 | 4.3 | −13.7 |
| Majority | | 371 | 14.8 | +14.8 |
| Turnout | | 2,516 | 28.9 | −6.4 |
| UKIP gain from Conservative | | Swing | 17.8% Con to UKIP | |

=== 2009 Election ===
Results of the election which took place on 4 June 2009:

Sompting & North Lancing
| Party | Candidate | Votes | % | ±% |
|---|---|---|---|---|
| Conservative | David Simmons | 1,376 | 45.3 | n/a |
| UKIP | Reuben Whiting | 747 | 24.6 | n/a |
| Liberal Democrats | Richard Burt | 546 | 18.0 | n/a |
| Labour | Barry Mear | 370 | 12.2 | n/a |
| Majority | | 629 | 20.7 | n/a |
| Turnout | | 3,039 | 35.3 | n/a |
| Conservative win (new seat) | | | | |
