= Tilgate & Furnace Green (electoral division) =

Electoral division of West Sussex, England

Coordinates: 51.10223°N 0.17544°W

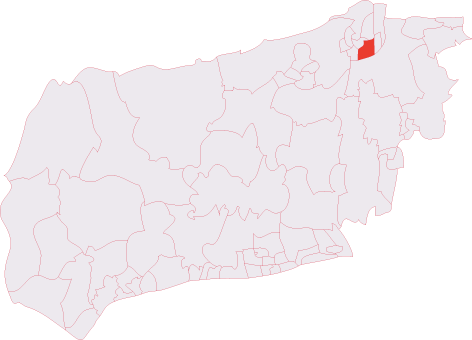
Tilgate & Furnace Green
Shown within West Sussex
District:	Crawley
UK Parliament Constituency:	Crawley
Ceremonial county:	West Sussex
Electorate (2009):	8759
County Councillor
Duncan Crow (Con)

Tilgate & Furnace Green is an electoral division of West Sussex in the United Kingdom, and returns one member to sit on West Sussex County Council.

== Extent ==
The division covers the neighbourhoods of Furnace Green and Tilgate, which form part of the urban area of the town of Crawley.

It falls entirely within the un-parished area of Crawley Borough and comprises the following borough wards: Furnace Green Ward and Tilgate Ward.

== Election results ==
=== 2021 election ===
Results of the election held 6 May 2021:

Tilgate & Furnace Green
Party	Candidate	Votes	%	±%
Conservative	Duncan Crow	1,989	56.7	−1.4
Labour	Colin Lloyd	1163	33.2	+4.5
Green	Tom Coombes	254	7.2	+4.8
Liberal Democrats	Harry Old	99	2.8	−2.3
Majority		826	23.5	−5.9
Turnout		3,505	39.5	+2.1
Conservative hold		Swing	-2.9%	

=== 2017 election ===
Results of the election held 4 May 2017:

Tilgate & Furnace Green
Party	Candidate	Votes	%	±%
Conservative	Duncan Crow	1,934	58.1	+13.8
Labour	Rajesh Sharma	955	28.7	−3.2
UKIP	Allan Griffiths	187	5.6	−10.9
Liberal Democrats	Kevin Osborne	170	5.1	+3.2
Green	Derek Hardman	81	2.4	−1.4
Majority		979	29.4	+17.0
Turnout		3,327	37.4	+0.1
Conservative hold		Swing	+8.5%	

=== 2013 election ===
Results of the election held 2 May 2013:

Tilgate & Furnace Green
Party	Candidate	Votes	%	±%
Conservative	Duncan Crow	1,461	44.3	−1.7
Labour	Colin Moffatt	1,054	31.9	+6.9
UKIP	Graham Harper	544	16.5	N/A
Green	Derek Hardman	124	3.8	N/A
Liberal Democrats	John Lovell	62	1.9	−15.9
Independent	Richard Symonds	56	1.7	N/A
Majority		407	12.4	−8.6
Turnout		3,301	37.3	−2.4
Conservative hold		Swing	-4.3%	

=== 2009 election ===
Results of the election held 4 June 2009:

Tilgate & Furnace Green
Party	Candidate	Votes	%	±%
Conservative	Duncan Crow	1,600	46.0	+5.4
Labour	Ian Irvine	871	25.0	−12.5
Liberal Democrats	Darren Wise	607	17.4	+0.4
BNP	Vernon Atkinson	401	11.5	N/A
Majority		729	21.0	+17.9
Turnout		3,479	39.7	−23.8
Conservative hold		Swing	+9.0%	

=== 2005 election ===
Results of the election held 5 May 2005:

Tilgate & Furnace Green
Party	Candidate	Votes	%	±%
Conservative	Duncan Crow	2,302	40.6	
Labour	William Ward	2,127	37.5	
Liberal Democrats	Roger McMurray	963	17.0	
Green	Vicky Dore	283	5.0	
Majority		175	3.1	
Turnout		5,675	63.5	
Conservative win (new seat)				
