= Holbrook (electoral division) =

Electoral division of West Sussex, England

Coordinates: 51.09145°N 0.31517°W

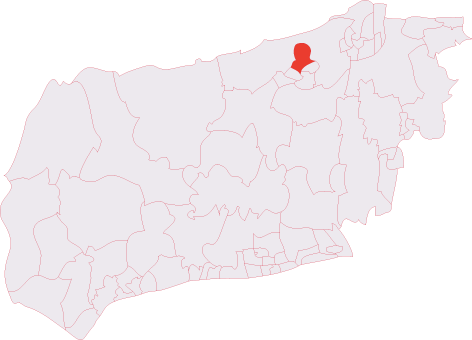
Holbrook
Shown within West Sussex
District:	Horsham
UK Parliament Constituency:	Horsham
Ceremonial county:	West Sussex
Electorate (2009):	8534
County Councillor
Peter Catchpole (Con)

Holbrook is an electoral division of West Sussex in the United Kingdom and returns one member to sit on West Sussex County Council. The current County Councillor, Peter Catchpole, is also Cabinet Member for Adults' Services.

== Extent ==
The division covers the northern part of the town of Horsham.

It comprises the following Horsham District wards: Holbrook East Ward and Holbrook West Ward; and of the following civil parishes: the western part of North Horsham and the northern part of Horsham.

== Election results ==
=== 2013 Election ===
Results of the election held on 2 May 2013:

Holbrook
Party	Candidate	Votes	%	±%
Conservative	Peter Catchpole	1,237	46.2	−0.9
UKIP	Sally Wilkins	678	25.3	N/A
Liberal Democrats	Leonard Crosbie	487	18.2	−25.1
Labour	Sheila Chapman	273	10.2	+6.7
Majority		559	20.9	+17.1
Turnout		2,675	30.4	−12.6
Conservative hold		Swing		

=== 2009 Election ===
Results of the election held on 4 June 2009:

Holbrook
Party	Candidate	Votes	%	±%
Conservative	Peter Catchpole	1,729	47.1	+2.7
Liberal Democrats	Belinda Walters	1,590	43.3	+1.9
BNP	Francis Carlin	192	5.2	N/A
Labour	Ray Chapman	161	4.4	−9.8
Majority		139	3.8	+0.8
Turnout		3,672	43.0	−25.7
Conservative hold		Swing		

=== 2005 Election ===
Results of the election held on 5 May 2005:

Holbrook
Party	Candidate	Votes	%	±%
Conservative	Peter Catchpole	2,546	44.4	
Liberal Democrats	Leonard Crosbie	2,374	41.4	
Labour	Ray Chapman	815	14.2	
Majority		172	3.0	
Turnout		5,734	68.7	
Conservative win (new seat)				
