= Worthing East (electoral division) =

Coordinates: 50.81700°N 0.35225°W

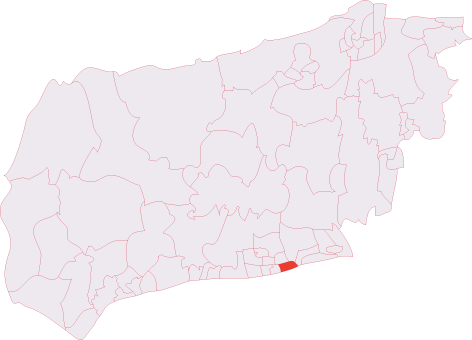
Worthing East
Shown within West Sussex
District:	Worthing
UK Parliament Constituency:	East Worthing & Shoreham, Worthing West
Ceremonial county:	West Sussex
Electorate (2009):	8029
County Councillor
Roger Oakley (Con)

Worthing East is an electoral division of West Sussex in the United Kingdom, and returns one member to sit on West Sussex County Council.

== Extent ==
The division covers the neighbourhood of East Worthing, which forms part of the urban area of the town of Worthing.

It falls entirely within the un-parished area of Worthing Borough and comprises the following borough wards: the east part of Central Ward, and Selden Ward.

== Election results ==
=== 2013 Election ===
Results of the election held on 2 May 2013:

Worthing East
Party	Candidate	Votes	%	±%
Conservative	Roger Oakley	675	30.3	−5.5
UKIP	Grant Lloyd	567	25.5	+10.5
Liberal Democrats	Christine Brown	540	24.3	−16.6
Labour	Mike Barrett	443	19.9	+11.7
Majority		108	4.8	
Turnout		2,225	26.0	−9.2
Conservative gain from Liberal Democrats		Swing		

=== 2009 Election ===
Results of the election held on 4 June 2009:

Worthing East
Party	Candidate	Votes	%	±%
Liberal Democrats	Irene Richards	1,157	40.9	−1.0
Conservative	Roger Oakley	1,012	35.8	−3.8
UKIP	Mick Clark	424	15.0	N/A
Labour	Ann Saunders	233	8.2	−10.4
Majority		145	5.1	+2.8
Turnout		2,826	35.2	−22.3
Liberal Democrats hold		Swing		

=== 2005 Election ===
Results of the election held on 5 May 2005:

Worthing East
Party	Candidate	Votes	%	±%
Liberal Democrats	Irene Richards	1,866	41.9	
Conservative	Jack Saheid	1,764	39.6	
Labour	Ann Saunders	828	18.6	
Majority		102	2.3	
Turnout		4,458	57.5	
Liberal Democrats win (new seat)				
