= Southwick (electoral division) =

Coordinates: 50.84920°N 0.24170°W

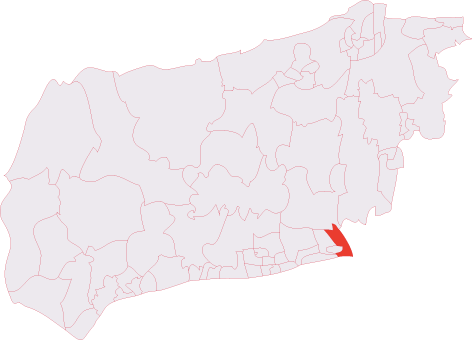
Southwick
Shown within West Sussex
District:	Adur
UK Parliament Constituency:	East Worthing & Shoreham
Ceremonial county:	West Sussex
Electorate (2009):	7727
County Councillor
Janet Mockridge (Con)

Southwick is an electoral division of West Sussex in the United Kingdom, and returns one member to sit on West Sussex County Council.

== Extent ==
The division covers the town of Southwick, including the neighbourhood of Fishersgate.

It comprises the following Adur district wards: Eastbrook Ward, Hillside Ward and the eastern part of Southwick Green Ward. It falls entirely within the un-parished area of Shoreham-by-Sea.

=== 2013 Election ===
Results of the election held on 2 May 2013:

Southwick
Party	Candidate	Votes	%	±%
Conservative	Janet Mockridge	738	36.2	−6.4
UKIP	Jenny Greig	611	30.0	+6.8
Labour	Brian Hall	426	20.9	+9.8
Liberal Democrats	David Edey	160	7.8	−6.2
Green	Moyra Martin	105	5.1	−4.5
Majority		127	6.2	−13.2
Turnout		2,040	25.6	−7.5
Conservative hold		Swing	6.6% Con to UKIP	

=== 2013 Election ===
Results of the election held on 4 June 2009:

Southwick
Party	Candidate	Votes	%	±%
Conservative	Janet Mockridge	1,089	42.6	+2.5
UKIP	Jenny Greig	593	23.2	+16.7
Liberal Democrats	John Hilditch	359	14.0	−5.5
Labour	Barry Thompson	273	10.7	−18.3
Green	Susan Board	245	9.6	+4.6
Majority		496	19.4	+8.3
Turnout		2,559	33.1	−30.9
Conservative hold		Swing		

=== 2006 By-election ===
Results of the by-election held on 14 September 2006:

Southwick
Party	Candidate	Votes	%	±%
Conservative	Janet Mockridge	907	55.5	+15.4
Labour	Andrew Bray	316	19.4	−9.6
Liberal Democrats	James Doyle	314	19.2	−0.3
Green	Susan Board	96	5.9	+0.9
Majority		591	36.1	
Turnout		1,633	21.0	
Conservative hold		Swing		

=== 2005 Election ===
Results of the election held on 5 May 2005:

Southwick
Party	Candidate	Votes	%	±%
Conservative	Mr K G Eade	1,966	40.1	
Labour Co-op	Ms A Lowe	1,423	29.0	
Liberal Democrats	Mr A J Mortimer	959	19.5	
UKIP	Ms J C Greig	317	6.5	
Green	Ms S E Board	243	5.0	
Majority		543	11.1	
Turnout		4,908	64.0	
Conservative win (new seat)				
