= Henfield (electoral division) =

Electoral division of West Sussex, England

Coordinates: 50.96383°N 0.29560°W

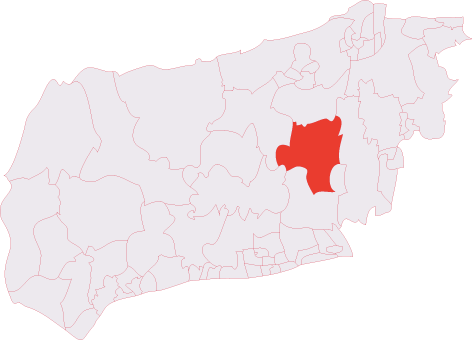
Henfield
Shown within West Sussex
District	Horsham District
UK Parliament constituencies	Arundel and South Downs and Horsham
Ceremonial county	West Sussex
Electorate	8,904 (2026)
County councillor
Roger Noel (Conservative)

Henfield is an electoral division of West Sussex, England. It returns one councillor to West Sussex County Council. Since the 2026 election, it has been represented by Roger Noel of the Conservative Party.

== Extent ==
The division includes Cowfold, Dial Post, the northern part of Henfield, Partridge Green, Shermanbury and West Grinstead.

It comprises the civil parishes of Cowfold, Shermanbury and West Grinstead, together with the northern part of Henfield civil parish.

== Election results ==
=== 2026 election ===
Results of the election held on 7 May 2026:

Henfield
Party	Candidate	Votes	%	±%
Conservative	Roger Noel	1,333	28.8	−24.5
Green	Jack Masters	1,251	27.0	+11.7
Reform	Paul Linehan	1,228	26.5	New
Liberal Democrats	Paul Dittmer	572	12.3	+4.7
Labour	Fiona Ayres	248	5.4	−18.4
Majority		82	1.8	−27.7
Turnout		4,641	52.1	+8.2
Conservative hold		Swing		

=== 2021 election ===
Results of the election held on 6 May 2021:

Henfield
Party	Candidate	Votes	%	±%
Conservative	Sarah Payne	2,117	53.3	−17.1
Labour	Fiona Ayres	944	23.8	+10.4
Green	Celia Emmott	608	15.3	New
Liberal Democrats	David Epps	303	7.6	−8.6
Majority		1,173	29.5	−24.7
Turnout		3,992	43.9	+9.5
Conservative hold		Swing		

=== 2017 election ===
Results of the election held on 4 May 2017:

Henfield
Party	Candidate	Votes	%	±%
Conservative	Lionel Barnard	2,051	70.4	+19.0
Liberal Democrats	David Boyle	471	16.2	+5.7
Labour	Helen Wright	391	13.4	+5.0
Majority		1,580	54.2	+32.6
Turnout		2,922	34.4	+5.5
Conservative hold		Swing		

=== 2013 election ===
Results of the election held on 2 May 2013:

Henfield
Party	Candidate	Votes	%	±%
Conservative	Lionel Barnard	1,248	51.4	−12.1
UKIP	Liz Wallace	723	29.8	New
Liberal Democrats	Andrew Purches	255	10.5	−13.2
Labour	Janet Miller	204	8.4	+2.9
Majority		525	21.6	−18.2
Turnout		2,430	28.9	−13.4
Conservative hold		Swing		

=== 2009 election ===
Results of the election held on 4 June 2009:

Henfield
Party	Candidate	Votes	%	±%
Conservative	Lionel Barnard	2,221	63.5	+1.7
Liberal Democrats	Andrew Purches	830	23.7	−14.5
BNP	Tony Aldous	257	7.3	New
Labour	Malcolm Uhlhorn	191	5.5	+5.5
Majority		1,391	39.8	+16.2
Turnout		3,499	42.3	−25.4
Conservative hold		Swing		

=== 2005 election ===
Results of the election held on 5 May 2005:

Henfield
Party	Candidate	Votes	%	±%
Conservative	Lionel Barnard	3,381	61.8	
Liberal Democrats	F. W. S. Taylor	2,086	38.2	
Majority		1,295	23.6	
Turnout		5,467	67.7	
Conservative win (new seat)				
