= Boundary Committee for England =

The Boundary Committee for England was a statutory committee of the Electoral Commission, an independent body set up by the UK Parliament. The committee's aim was to conduct thorough, consultative and robust reviews of local government areas in England, and for its recommendations to be evidence-based, accurate and accepted. The Boundary Committee was abolished in 2010, with its functions assumed by a new Local Government Boundary Commission for England.

The committee's responsibilities related solely to local government boundaries: responsibility for parliamentary boundaries lies with the Boundary Commission for England, a non-departmental public body of the Ministry of Housing, Communities and Local Government.

== History/establishment ==
On 1 April 2002 responsibility for electoral reviews in England transferred to the Electoral Commission. On the same day the Boundary Committee for England became a statutory committee of the commission. The committee undertook electoral reviews and made recommendations to the commission as to whether electoral changes should be made in respect of the area under review. The commission then decided whether to implement the committee's recommendations. The decision of the commission would be taken at a commission meeting comprising the Electoral Commissioners as members.

The Boundary Committee for England replaced the Local Government Commission for England, which was the body responsible for reviewing the structure of local government in England from 1992 to 2002. The equivalent bodies operating in other parts of the United Kingdom are the Local Government Boundary Commission for Wales, the Local Government Boundary Commission for Scotland and the Local Government Boundary Commission for Northern Ireland.

The protocol on the relationship between the Boundary Committee for England and the Electoral Commission sets out the roles and responsibilities of each body in terms of securing fair boundary arrangements for local elections in England.

== Responsibilities and objectives ==
The Boundary Committee for England was responsible for three types of review: electoral reviews; administrative boundary reviews; and structural reviews.

== Electoral reviews ==
An electoral review considered whether the boundaries of wards or divisions within a local authority need to be altered to take account of changes in electorate. The Electoral Commission would direct the committee to undertake electoral reviews and was then responsible for implementing them.

The committee also looked at the number of councillors, the number of wards or divisions and whether the wards or divisions should be represented by a single councillor, or jointly by two or three councillors.

== Administrative boundary reviews ==
At the request of the Department for Communities and Local Government or of a local authority, or at the Boundary Committee for England's instigation, the committee could undertake administrative boundary reviews, which reviewed the external boundaries of a local authority.

== Structural reviews ==
A structural review was used to establish whether one or more single, all-purpose councils, known as unitary authorities, should be established in an area instead of the district and county councils of the existing two-tier system.

== Organisation ==
Chair and committee members

- Max Caller CBE was appointed chair of the Boundary Committee for England in 2007. He also serves as an Electoral Commissioner.

Boundary Committee members:

- Jane Earl
- Joan Jones CBE
- Professor Colin Mellors
- Dr Peter Knight CBE DL

- The Director of the Boundary Committee for England was Archie Gall

== LDEDC Act – changes to Boundary Committee structure ==
The Local Democracy, Economic Development and Construction Act 2009, which received royal assent on 12 November 2009, provided for the establishment of the Local Government Boundary Commission for England (LGBCE), and for the transfer to it of all the boundary-related functions of the Electoral Commission and the Boundary Committee for England. This reflects the recommendations of the Committee on Standards on Public Life (CSPL), which were supported by the Electoral Commission and the Boundary Committee. This transfer took place in April 2010.
