= Littlehampton East (electoral division) =

Electoral division of West Sussex, England

Coordinates: 50.81255°N 0.52374°W

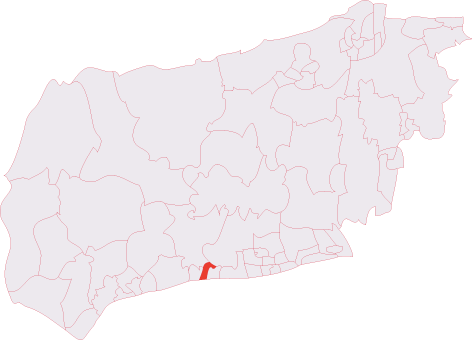
Littlehampton East
Shown within West Sussex
| District: | Arun |
| UK Parliament Constituency: | Bognor Regis & Littlehampton, Worthing West |
| Ceremonial county: | West Sussex |
| Electorate (2009): | 8899 |
County Councillor
James Walsh (LD)

Littlehampton East is an electoral division of West Sussex in the United Kingdom and returns one member to sit on West Sussex County Council.

== Extent ==
The division covers the eastern part of the town of Littlehampton.

It comprises the following Arun District wards: Beach Ward, the eastern part of Brookfield Ward, and the northern part of Rustington West Ward; and of the following civil parishes: the eastern part of Littlehampton and the northwestern part of Rustington.

== Election results ==
=== 2013 Election ===
Results of the election held on 2 May 2013:

Littlehampton East
| Party | Candidate | Votes | % | ±% |
|---|---|---|---|---|
| Liberal Democrats | James Walsh | 1,106 | 39.1 | −6.0 |
| UKIP | Geoff Holloway | 772 | 27.3 | +11.0 |
| Conservative | Emma Neno | 737 | 26.1 | −3.7 |
| Labour | Christine Macdonald | 214 | 7.6 | +2.3 |
| Majority | | 434 | 11.8 | −1.7 |
| Turnout | | 2,829 | 32.1 | −5.9 |
| Liberal Democrats hold | | Swing | | |

=== 2009 Election ===
Results of the election held on 4 June 2009:

Littlehampton East
| Party | Candidate | Votes | % | ±% |
|---|---|---|---|---|
| Liberal Democrats | James Walsh | 1,525 | 45.1 | +8.0 |
| Conservative | Joyce Bowyer | 1,007 | 29.8 | −2.2 |
| UKIP | Robert East | 553 | 16.3 | +7.2 |
| Labour | Steve McConnell | 179 | 5.3 | −16.4 |
| BNP | Jim Baxter | 120 | 3.5 | N/A |
| Majority | | 518 | 13.5 | +8.4 |
| Turnout | | 3,384 | 38.0 | −24.3 |
| Liberal Democrats hold | | Swing | | |

=== 2005 Election ===
Results of the election held on 5 May 2005:

Littlehampton East
| Party | Candidate | Votes | % | ±% |
|---|---|---|---|---|
| Liberal Democrats | Dr J M M Walsh | 2,132 | 37.1 | |
| Conservative | Mr G M Tyler | 1,837 | 32.0 | |
| Labour | Mr M J Thomson | 1,246 | 21.7 | |
| UKIP | Mr R H East | 524 | 9.1 | |
| Majority | | 295 | 5.1 | |
| Turnout | | 5,739 | 62.3 | |
| Liberal Democrats win (new seat) | | | | |
