= Worthing West (electoral division) =

Coordinates: 50.81214°N 0.39757°W

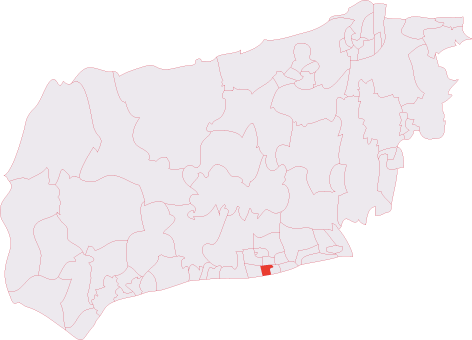
Worthing West
Shown within West Sussex
District:	Worthing
UK Parliament Constituency:	Worthing West
Ceremonial county:	West Sussex
Electorate (2009):	8605
County Councillor
Paul High (Con)

Worthing West is an electoral division of West Sussex in England, and returns one member to sit on West Sussex County Council. The ward has existed since 2005 and was first used in the 2005 elections.

== Extent ==
The division covers the neighbourhood of West Worthing, which forms part of the urban area of the town of Worthing.

It falls entirely within the un-parished area of Worthing Borough and comprises the following borough wards: the north part of Heene Ward, and Marine Ward.

== List of councillors ==
Councillor	Party	From	To
John Livermore	Conservative	May 2005	May 2013
Paul High	Conservative	May 2013	5 May 2021
Beccy Cooper	Labour	6 May 2021	Jul 2022
Graham McKnight	Labour	7 Jul 2022	Present

== Election results ==
=== 2005 Election ===
Results of the election held on 5 May 2005:

Worthing West
Party	Candidate	Votes	%	±%
Conservative	Mr J Livermore	2,357	45.22	
Liberal Democrats	Mr A S Rice	1,295	24.8	
Labour	Mr B F Slater	820	15.7	
Green	Mrs L Colkett	392	7.5	
UKIP	Mr P A Ruddock	266	5.1	
Independent	Mr J D Robers	82	1.6	
Majority		1,062	20.4	
Turnout		5,212	60.5	
Conservative win (new seat)				

=== 2009 Election ===
Results of the election held on 4 June 2009:

Worthing West
Party	Candidate	Votes	%	±%
Conservative	John Livermore	1,529	48.9	+3.7
Liberal Democrats	Yvonne Leonard	731	23.4	−1.4
UKIP	Phil Ruddock	616	19.7	+14.6
Labour	Eileen Powell	248	7.9	−7.8
Majority		798	25.5	+5.1
Turnout		3,124	36.3	−24.2
Conservative hold		Swing		

=== 2013 Election ===
Results of the election held on 2 May 2013:

Worthing West
Party	Candidate	Votes	%	±%
Conservative	Paul High	917	38.7	−10.2
UKIP	Rick Setford	759	32.1	+12.4
Labour	Alexandra Wagstaff	266	11.2	+3.3
Liberal Democrats	Yvonne Leonard	217	9.2	−14.2
Green	Daniel Aherne	209	8.8	N/A
Majority		158	6.6	−18.9
Turnout		2,368	26.6	−9.7
Conservative gain from UKIP		Swing	11.3% Con to UKIP	

=== 2017 Election ===
Results of the election held on 4 May 2017:

Worthing West
Party	Candidate	Votes	%	±%
Conservative	Paul High	1,605	51.6	+12.9
Labour	Richard Mulholland	681	21.9	+10.7
Liberal Democrats	Keith Sunderland	372	12.0	+2.8
Green	Caroline Ponto	264	8.5	−0.3
UKIP	Trevor England	189	6.1	−26.0
Majority		924	29.7	+23.1
Turnout		3,131	35.2	+8.6
Conservative hold		Swing		

=== 2021 Election ===
Results of the election held on 6 May 2021:

Worthing West
Party	Candidate	Votes	%	±%
Labour	Beccy Cooper	1,824	46.4	+24.5
Conservative	Paul High	1,540	39.1	−12.5
Green	Sonya Mallin	285	7.2	−1.3
Liberal Democrats	Jacqueline Cranefield	171	4.3	−7.7
Independent	Christopher Woodward	114	2.9	N/A
Majority				
Labour gain from Conservative		Swing		
