= Chichester West (electoral division) =

Electoral division in West Sussex, England

Coordinates: 50.84822°N 0.82912°W

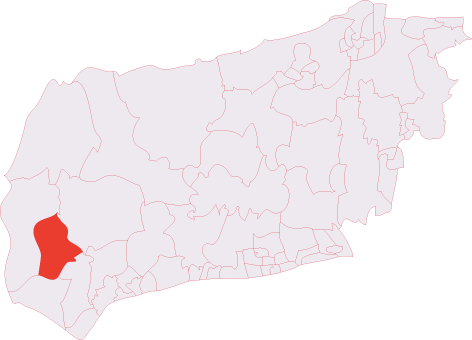
Chichester West
Shown within West Sussex
District:	Chichester
UK Parliament Constituency:	Chichester
Ceremonial county:	West Sussex
Electorate (2021):	9747
County Councillor
Julian Joy (Ind)

Chichester West is an electoral division of West Sussex in the United Kingdom, and returns one member to sit on West Sussex County Council. The current County Councillor, Louise Goldsmith, is also Cabinet Member for Finance & Resources.

== Extent ==
The division covers the western part of the town of Chichester; and the villages of Bosham, East Ashling, Fishbourne, Funtington, West Ashling and West Stoke.

It comprises the following Chichester District wards: Bosham Ward, Chichester West Ward, Fishbourne Ward and Funtington Ward; and of the following civil parishes: Bosham, the western part of Chichester, Fishbourne and Funtington.

== Election results ==
=== 2017 Election ===
Results of the election held on 4 May 2017:

Chichester West
Party	Candidate	Votes	%	±%
Conservative	L Goldsmith	2,691	54.6	+0.77
UKIP	B A Smith	173	4.38	−18.72
Liberal Democrats	A G F Moss	1,046	26.51	+15.61
Labour	J D Hobson	279	7.07	−3.43
Patria	A Emerson	21	0.53	−0.27
Majority		1,139	28.86	−2.64
Turnout		3,946	41.00	+8.8
Conservative hold		Swing	30.0% Con to LD	

=== 2013 Election ===
Results of the election held on 2 May 2013:

Chichester West
Party	Candidate	Votes	%	±%
Conservative	Louise Goldsmith	1,691	54.6	−0.4
UKIP	Douglas Denny	716	23.1	+13.6
Liberal Democrats	Jon Stevens	339	10.9	−6.5
Labour	John Bennett	326	10.5	+5.5
Patria	Andrew Emerson	26	0.8	N/A
Majority		975	31.5	−6.1
Turnout		3,098	32.2	−10.8
Conservative hold		Swing	7.0% Con to UKIP	

=== 2009 Election ===
Results of the election held on 4 June 2009:

Chichester West
Party	Candidate	Votes	%	±%
Conservative	Louise Goldsmith	2,190	55.0	+15.6
Liberal Democrats	Barbara Henry	692	17.4	−15.6
UKIP	James McCulloch	380	9.5	+3.6
Green	Richard Lanchester	378	9.5	N/A
Labour	John Bennett	199	5.0	−9.1
BNP	Andrew Emerson	142	3.6	N/A
Majority		1,498	37.6	+31.2
Turnout		3,981	43.0	−22.3
Conservative hold		Swing		

=== 2005 Election ===
Results of the election held on 5 May 2005:

Chichester West
Party	Candidate	Votes	%	±%
Conservative	Ms M L Goldsmith	2,446	39.4	
Liberal Democrats	Mr J R Campling	2,051	33.0	
Labour	Mr R J Hastings	875	14.1	
UKIP	Mr J McCulloch	367	5.9	
Independent	Mr A J Phillips	268	4.3	
Independent	Mr R I Apel	202	3.3	
Majority		395	6.4	
Turnout		6,209	68.9	
Conservative win (new seat)				
