= East Preston & Ferring (electoral division) =

Coordinates: 50.80767°N 0.46452°W

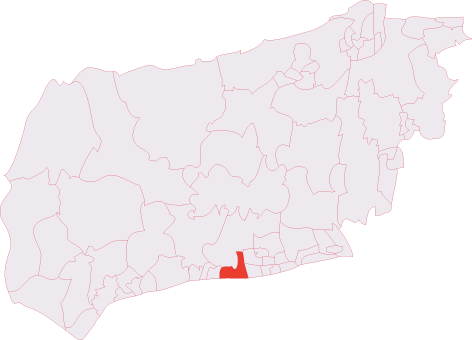
East Preston & Ferring
Shown within West Sussex
| District: | Arun |
| UK Parliament Constituency: | Worthing West |
| Ceremonial county: | West Sussex |
| Electorate (2009): | 9762 |
County Councillor
Roger Elkins (Conservative)

East Preston & Ferring is an electoral division of West Sussex in the United Kingdom and returns one member to sit on West Sussex County Council. The current County Councillor, Peter Evans, is also Cabinet Member for Public Protection.

== Extent ==
The division covers the villages of East Preston, Ferring and Kingston Gorse.

It comprises the following Arun District wards: East Preston with Kingston Ward, and Ferring Ward; and of the following civil parishes: East Preston, Ferring and Kingston.

== Election results ==
=== 2013 Election ===
Results of the election held on 2 May 2013:

East Preston & Ferring
| Party | Candidate | Votes | % | ±% |
|---|---|---|---|---|
| Conservative | Peter Evans | 1,804 | 49.3 | −16.7 |
| UKIP | Phil Ruddock | 1,142 | 31.2 | N/A |
| Labour | Ed Miller | 527 | 14.4 | +5.7 |
| Liberal Democrats | Trevor Richards | 187 | 5.1 | −9.4 |
| Majority | | 662 | 18.1 | −33.4 |
| Turnout | | 3,660 | 36.6 | −9.3 |
| Conservative hold | | Swing | | |

=== 2009 Election ===
The latest election took place on 4 June 2009:

East Preston & Ferring
| Party | Candidate | Votes | % | ±% |
|---|---|---|---|---|
| Conservative | Peter Evans | 2,956 | 66.0 | +8.8 |
| Liberal Democrats | Christine Brown | 649 | 14.5 | −7.7 |
| English Democrat | Clive Maltby | 482 | 10.8 | N/A |
| Labour | Ed Miller | 390 | 8.7 | −6.7 |
| Majority | | 2,307 | 51.5 | +16.5 |
| Turnout | | 4,477 | 45.9 | −23.9 |
| Conservative hold | | Swing | | |

=== 2005 Election ===
Results of the election held on 5 May 2005:

East Preston & Ferring
| Party | Candidate | Votes | % | ±% |
|---|---|---|---|---|
| Conservative | Mr P C Evans | 3,781 | 57.2 | |
| Liberal Democrats | Mr J M Richards | 1,464 | 22.2 | |
| Labour | Mr H E Miller | 1,015 | 15.4 | |
| UKIP | Mr P V Skinner | 348 | 5.3 | |
| Majority | | 2,317 | 35.0 | |
| Turnout | | 6,608 | 69.8 | |
| Conservative win (new seat) | | | | |
