= Bersted (electoral division) =

British electoral division

Coordinates: 50.81027°N 0.68184°W

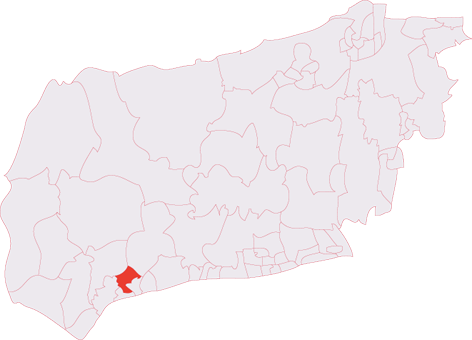
Bersted
Shown within West Sussex
District:	Arun
UK Parliament Constituency:	Bognor Regis & Littlehampton
Ceremonial county:	West Sussex
Electorate (2021):	10,351
County Councillor
Keir Greenway (CON)

Bersted is an electoral division of West Sussex in the United Kingdom and returns one member to sit on West Sussex County Council.

== Extent ==
The division covers the community of North Bersted, which forms part of the urban area of Bognor Regis; and the hamlet of Shripney.

It comprises the following Arun District wards: the northern and western part of Bersted Ward, and Pevensey Ward; and of the following civil parishes: the northern and western part of Bersted, and the Pevensey Ward area of Bognor Regis.

== Election result ==
=== 2021 Election ===
Results of the election held on 6 May 2021:

Bersted
Party	Candidate	Votes	%	±%
Conservative	Keir Greenway	1,040	37.3	+3.9
Independent	Paul Wells	676	24.5	N/A
Liberal Democrats	Gill Yeates	633	23.0	+3.3
Labour	Nigel Smith	409	14.8	+0.3
Majority		631	22.9	+9.2
Turnout		2,758	26.9	−1.2
Conservative hold		Swing		

=== 2017 Election ===
Results of the election held on 4 May 2017:

Bersted
Party	Candidate	Votes	%	±%
Conservative	David Edwards	901	33.4	+15.2
Liberal Democrats	Martin Smith	531	19.7	−1.0
UKIP	Ruth Kenward	498	18.5	−22.5
Labour	Vincent McCabe	390	14.5	−5.6
Independent	Gillian Yeates	270	10.0	+10.0
Green	David Meagher	105	3.9	+3.9
Majority		370	13.7	N/A
Turnout		2,695	28.1	−0.1
Conservative gain from UKIP		Swing	+18.9	

=== 2013 Election ===
Results of the election held on 2 May 2013:

Bersted
Party	Candidate	Votes	%	±%
UKIP	Ann Rapnik	1044	41.0	+23.9
Liberal Democrats	Simon McDougall	526	20.7	−12.5
Labour	Roger Nash	512	20.1	+9.2
Conservative	Paul Dendle	462	18,2	−11.1
Majority		518	20.4	N/A
Turnout		2,544	28.2	−5.9
UKIP gain from Liberal Democrats		Swing		

=== 2009 Election ===
Results of the election held on 4 June 2009:

Bersted
Party	Candidate	Votes	%	±%
Liberal Democrats	Simon McDougall	992	33.2	+2.8
Conservative	Ann Smee	873	29.2	+0.3
UKIP	Ann Rapnik	511	17.1	+6.3
Labour	Simon Holland	326	10.9	−19.1
BNP	Mike Witchell	285	9.5	+9.5
Majority		119	4.0	+3.6
Turnout		2,987	34.1	−24.8
Liberal Democrats hold		Swing		

=== 2005 Election ===
Results of the election held on 5 May 2005:

Bersted
Party	Candidate	Votes	%	±%
Liberal Democrats	Mr S E McDougall	1,684	30.4	
Labour	Mr S Holland	1,661	30.0	
Conservative	Mr B W Widger	1,600	28.9	
UKIP	Mr J R W Spencer	598	10.8	
Majority		23	0.4	
Turnout		5,543	58.9	
Liberal Democrats win (new seat)				
