= Felpham (electoral division) =

Electoral division in England

Coordinates: 50.79791°N 0.64751°W

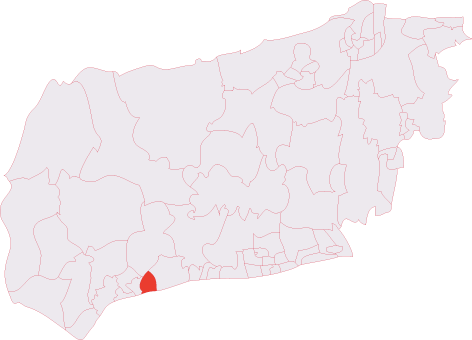
Felpham
Shown within West Sussex
District:	Arun
UK Parliament Constituency:	Arundel & South Downs, Bognor Regis & Littlehampton
Ceremonial county:	West Sussex
Electorate (2009):	7828
County Councillor
Hilary Flynn (Conservative)

Felpham is an electoral division of West Sussex in England and returns one member to sit on West Sussex County Council.

== Extent ==
The division covers the neighbourhoods of Felpham and Flansham which form part of the urban area of Bognor Regis.

It comprises the following Arun District wards: Felpham East Ward and Felpham West Ward; and of the following civil parishes: Felpham and the southern part of Yapton.

== Election results ==
=== 2013 Election ===
Results of the election held on 2 May 2013:

Felpham
Party	Candidate	Votes	%	±%
UKIP	Graham Jones	989	35.1	+11.2
Conservative	George Blampied	926	32.8	−21.7
Independent	Sandra Daniells	660	23.4	N/A
Labour	Steve M^{c}Connell	154	5.5	−0.7
Liberal Democrats	David Meagher	90	3.2	−12.2
Majority		63	2.3	+2.3
Turnout		2,819	35.2	−4.1
UKIP gain from Conservative		Swing	16.5% Con to UKIP	

=== 2009 Election ===
Results of the election held on 4 June 2009:

Felpham
Party	Candidate	Votes	%	±%
Conservative	George Blampied	1,676	54.5	+9.3
UKIP	Alicia Denny	734	23.9	+14.7
Liberal Democrats	Jason Passingham	474	15.4	−16.3
Labour	Michelle White	191	6.2	−7.7
Majority		942	30.6	+17.1
Turnout		3,075	39.3	−29.2
Conservative hold		Swing		

=== 2005 Election ===
Results of the election held on 5 May 2005:

Felpham
Party	Candidate	Votes	%	±%
Conservative	Mr G G Blampied	2,371	45.2	
Liberal Democrats	Mr M J Harvey	1,663	31.7	
Labour	Mr J B Cosgrove	727	13.9	
UKIP	Mr A J Richardson	482	9.2	
Majority		708	13.5	
Turnout		5,243	68.5	
Conservative win (new seat)				
