= Rustington (disambiguation) =

Rustington may refer to:

- Rustington
- Rustington F.C.
- Rustington (electoral division)
- Rustington (hymn)
