= Nyetimber (electoral division) =

Coordinates: 50.78510°N 0.73299°W

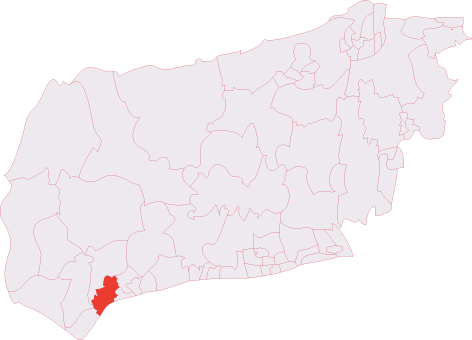
Nyetimber
Shown within West Sussex
District:	Arun
UK Parliament Constituency:	Bognor Regis & Littlehampton
Ceremonial county:	West Sussex
Electorate (2009):	9113
County Councillor
Tony Sutcliffe (UKIP)

Nyetimber is an electoral division of West Sussex in the United Kingdom and returns one member to sit on West Sussex County Council.

== Extent ==
The division covers the neighbourhoods of Nyetimber, Pagham and Rose Green, which form part of the urban area of the town of Bognor Regis; and also the hamlet of Lagness.

It comprises the following Arun District wards: the southern part of Aldwick West Ward, and Pagham & Rose Green Ward; and of the following civil parishes: the western part of Aldwick, and Pagham.

== Election results ==
=== 2013 Election ===
Results of the election held on 2 May 2013:

Nyetimber
Party	Candidate	Votes	%	±%
UKIP	Tony Sutcliffe	1,503	48.9	+24.3
Conservative	Mike Coleman	1,058	34.4	−13.3
Labour	Pauline Nash	309	10.1	+4.5
Liberal Democrats	Gregory Burt	203	6.6	−7.9
Majority		445	14.5	+14.5
Turnout		3,073	33.0	−8.2
UKIP gain from Conservative		Swing	18.8% Con to UKIP	

=== 2009 Election ===
Results of the election held on 4 June 2009:

Nyetimber
Party	Candidate	Votes	%	±%
Conservative	Mike Coleman	1,791	47.7	0.0
UKIP	Douglas Denny	924	24.6	+15.1
Liberal Democrats	Gregory Burt	544	14.5	−6.7
Labour	Pauline Nash	247	6.6	−14.9
BNP	Paul Cole	245	6.5	
Majority		867	23.1	−3.1
Turnout		3,751	41.2	−26.9
Conservative hold		Swing		

=== 2005 Election ===
Results of the election held on 5 May 2005:

Nyetimber
Party	Candidate	Votes	%	±%
Conservative	Mr M W G Coleman	3,263	47.7	
Labour	Ms P P Nash	1,468	21.5	
Liberal Democrats	Mr G C Burt	1,450	21.2	
UKIP	Mr S D Porter	649	9.5	
Majority		1,795	26.2	
Turnout		6,830	68.1	
Conservative win (new seat)				
