= Middleton (electoral division) =

Coordinates: 50.81331°N 0.59704°W

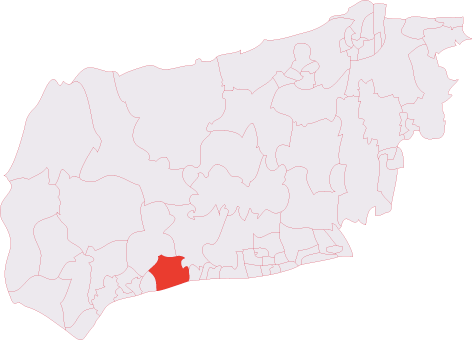
Middleton
Shown within West Sussex
District:	Arun
UK Parliament Constituency:	Bognor Regis & Littlehampton, Arundel & South Downs
Ceremonial county:	West Sussex
Electorate (2009):	8397
County Councillor
Joan Phillips (UKIP)

Middleton is an electoral division of West Sussex in the United Kingdom and returns one member to sit on West Sussex County Council.

== Extent ==
The division covers the villages of Atherington, Climping, Elmer, Ford, Middleton-on-Sea and Yapton.

It comprises the following Arun District wards: Middleton-on-Sea Ward and Yapton Ward; and of the following civil parishes: Climping, Ford, Middleton-on-Sea and the northern part of Yapton.

== Election results ==
=== 2013 Election ===
Results of the election held on 2 May 2013:

Middleton
Party	Candidate	Votes	%	±%
UKIP	Joan Phillips	1,181	44.2	+16.7
Conservative	Hilary Flynn	1,099	41.2	−7.7
Labour	Gilbert Cockburn	268	10.0	+3.6
Liberal Democrats	Conrad Meagher	121	7.2	−8.9
Majority		82	3.0	+3.0
Turnout		2,669	31.5	−7.7
UKIP gain from Conservative		Swing	12.2% Con to UKIP	

=== 2009 Election ===
Results of the election held on 4 June 2009:

Middleton
Party	Candidate	Votes	%	±%
Conservative	Christina Freeman	1,640	49.9	−0.9
UKIP	Joan Phillips	906	27.5	+18.6
Liberal Democrats	David Bliss	531	16.1	−6.8
Labour	Stan Nattrass	212	6.4	−12.8
Majority		734	22.4	−3.7
Turnout		3,289	39.2	−24.4
Conservative hold		Swing		

=== 2005 Election ===
Results of the election held on 5 May 2005:

Middleton
Party	Candidate	Votes	%	±%
Conservative	Mrs C A Freeman	2,528	49.0	
Liberal Democrats	Ms R A Kissell	1,181	22.9	
Labour	Mr S B McConnell	989	19.2	
UKIP	Mr A C Sutcliffe	459	8.9	
Majority		1,347	26.1	
Turnout		5,157	63.6	
Conservative win (new seat)				
