= Bognor Regis East (electoral division) =

Coordinates: 50.79422°N 0.67326°W

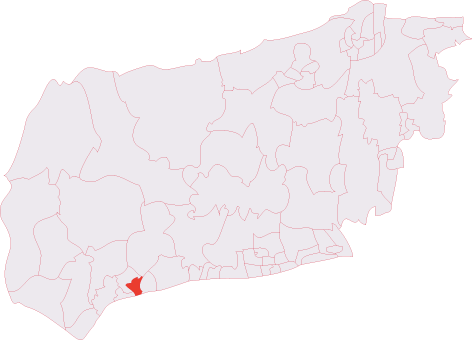
Bognor Regis East
Shown within West Sussex
District:	Arun
UK Parliament Constituency:	Bognor Regis & Littlehampton
Ceremonial county:	West Sussex
Electorate (2009):	9305
County Councillor
Francis Oppler (LD)

Bognor Regis East is an electoral division of West Sussex in the United Kingdom and returns one member to sit on West Sussex County Council.

== Extent ==
The division covers the community of South Bersted, and the eastern half of the urban area of Bognor Regis.

It comprises the following Arun District wards: the southern part of Bersted Ward, Hotham Ward and Orchard Ward; and of the following civil parishes: the southeastern part of Bersted and the eastern part of Bognor Regis.

== Election results ==
=== 2021 Election ===
Results of the election held on 6 May 2021:

Bognor Regis East
Party	Candidate	Votes	%	±%
Liberal Democrats	Francis Oppler	689	37	
Conservative	Steve Reynolds	612	33	
Labour	Roger Nash	285	15	
Green	Chloe Wilkinson	136	7	
Independent	Phil Woodall	123	7	
Majority		77		
Turnout		1,845	21	
Liberal Democrats hold		Swing		

=== 2017 Election ===
Results of the election held on 4 May 2017:

Bognor Regis East
Party	Candidate	Votes	%	±%
Liberal Democrats	Francis Oppler	962	42	
Conservative	Kate Eccles	644	28	
Labour	Heather Robbins	357	16	
UKIP	Chloe Watson	227	10	
Green	Conrad Meagher	83	4	
Majority		318		
Turnout		2,273		
Liberal Democrats hold		Swing		

=== 2013 Election ===
Results of the election held on 2 May 2013:

Bognor Regis East
Party	Candidate	Votes	%	±%
Liberal Democrats	Francis Oppler	763	35.2	−10.7
UKIP	Derek Ambler	733	33.8	+15.2
Labour	Jan Cosgrove	351	16.2	+16.2
Conservative	David Edwards	322	14.8	−10.7
Majority		30	1.4	−19.0
Turnout		2,169	24.4	−5.5
Liberal Democrats hold		Swing		

=== 2009 Election ===
Results of the election held on 4 June 2009:

Bognor Regis East
Party	Candidate	Votes	%	±%
Liberal Democrats	Francis Oppler	1,279	45.9	+13.9
Conservative	Phil Hitchins	711	25.5	+3.5
UKIP	Phil Lee	517	18.6	+9.0
BNP	Albert Bodle	278	10.0	+10.0
Majority		568	20.4	+17.9
Turnout		2,785	29.9	−25.3
Liberal Democrats hold		Swing		

=== 2005 Election ===
Results of the election held on 5 May 2005:

Bognor Regis East
Party	Candidate	Votes	%	±%
Liberal Democrats	Mr F R J Oppler	1,331	32.0	
Labour	Mr M G Jones	1,228	29.5	
Conservative	Mr D M Machonachie	1,206	29.0	
UKIP	Mr A Otton	398	9.6	
Majority		103	2.5	
Turnout		4,163	55.2	
Liberal Democrats win (new seat)				
