= Haywards Heath East (electoral division) =

Electoral division of West Sussex, United Kingdom

Coordinates: 50.99382°N 0.08866°W

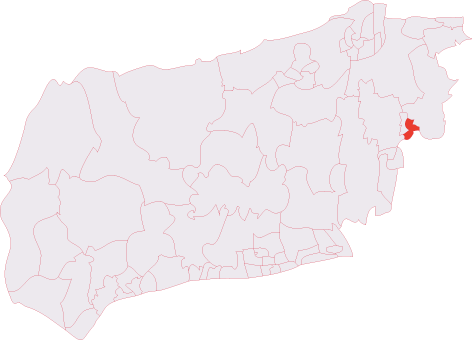
Haywards Heath East
Shown within West Sussex
District:	Mid Sussex
UK Parliament Constituency:	Mid Sussex
Ceremonial county:	West Sussex
Electorate (2013):	7930
County Councillor
Stephen Hillier (Con)

Haywards Heath East is an electoral division of West Sussex in the United Kingdom, and returns one member to sit on West Sussex County Council.

== Extent ==
The division covers the eastern part of the town of Haywards Heath.

It comprises the following Mid Sussex District wards: Haywards Heath Bentswood Ward and Haywards Heath Franklands Ward; and of the eastern part of the civil parish of Haywards Heath.

On 31 October 2013 John de Mierre died, this necessitated the holding of a bye-election, which was held on 19 December 2013

== Election results ==
=== 2013 Bye-election ===
Results of the bye-election held on 19 December 2013:

Haywards Heath East
Party	Candidate	Votes	%	±%
Conservative	Stephen Hillier	649	35.5	+1.7
UKIP	Charles Burrell	576	31.5	+5.1
Labour	Richard Goddard	346	18.9	−2.7
Liberal Democrats	Anne Hall	201	11.0	−8.2
Green	Paul Brown	55	3.0	N/A
Majority		73	4.0	−2.4
Turnout		1832	23.1	−6.6
Conservative hold		Swing	-1.2	

=== 2013 Election ===
Results of the election held on 2 May 2013:

Haywards Heath East
Party	Candidate	Votes	%	±%
Conservative	John de Mierre	789	33.8	−5.9
UKIP	Charles Burrell	617	26.4	N/A
Labour	Richard Goddard	505	21.6	+8.1
Liberal Democrats	Anne Hall	424	18.2	−23.0
Majority		172	6.4	N/A
Turnout		2,335	29.7	−9.4
Conservative gain from Liberal Democrats		Swing		

=== 2009 Election ===
Results of the election held on 4 June 2009:

Haywards Heath East
Party	Candidate	Votes	%	±%
Liberal Democrats	Anne Hall	1,237	41.2	+8.2
Conservative	John de Mierre	1,194	39.7	+3.4
Labour	Osiji Onah	406	13.5	−17.2
BNP	Richard Trower	168	5.6	+5.6
Majority		43	1.5	+1.5
Turnout		3,005	39.1	−28.5
Liberal Democrats gain from Conservative		Swing		

=== 2005 Election ===
Results of the election held on 5 May 2005:

Haywards Heath East
Party	Candidate	Votes	%	±%
Conservative	Mr A J De-Mierre	1,779	36.3	
Liberal Democrats	Ms J Brown	1,615	33.0	
Labour	Mr P J Henry	1,504	30.7	
Majority		164	3.3	
Turnout		4,898	67.6	
Conservative win (new seat)				
