= Arundel & Wick (electoral division) =

Former electoral division of West Sussex, England

Coordinates: 50.83673°N 0.55756°W

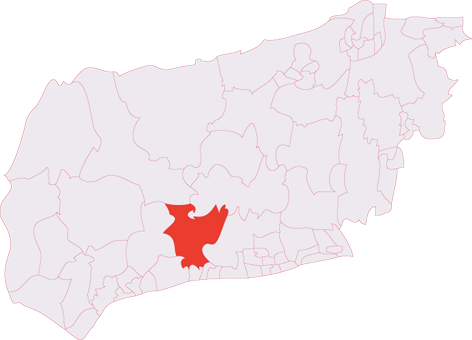
Arundel & Wick
Shown within West Sussex
District:	Arun
UK Parliament Constituency:	Arundel & South Downs, Bognor Regis & Littlehampton
Ceremonial county:	West Sussex
Electorate (2009):	7664
County Councillor
Nigel Peters (Con)

Arundel & Wick is an electoral division of West Sussex in the United Kingdom and returns one member to sit on West Sussex County Council.

== Extent ==
The division covers the town of Arundel; the villages of Burpham, Houghton, Lyminster, South Stoke, Tortington and Warningcamp, and the communities of Toddington and Wick which form part of the urban area of Littlehampton.

It comprises the following Arun District wards: Arundel Ward and Wick with Toddington Ward; and of the following civil parishes: Arundel, Burpham, Houghton, the northern part of Littlehampton, Lyminster & Crossbush, South Stoke and Warningcamp.

== Election results ==
=== 2013 Election ===
Results of the election held on 2 May 2013

Arundel & Wick
Party	Candidate	Votes	%	±%
Conservative	Nigel Peters	967	42.1	−14.1
UKIP	Jeannie Dunning	783	34.1	N/A
Labour	Alan Butcher	387	16.9	+7.6
Liberal Democrats	Nick Wiltshire	161	7.0	−27.4
Majority		184	8.0	−13.8
Turnout		2,298	27.7	−10.5
Conservative hold		Swing		

=== 2009 Election ===
Results of the election held on 4 June 2009:

Arundel & Wick
Party	Candidate	Votes	%	±%
Conservative	Nigel Peters	1,648	56.2	+18.7
Liberal Democrats	Nick Wiltshire	1,009	34.4	+7.1
Labour	Alan Butcher	274	9.3	−17.0
Majority		639	21.8	+11.6
Turnout		2,931	38.2	−26.7
Conservative hold		Swing		

=== 2005 Election ===
Results of the election held on 5 May 2005:

Arundel & Wick
Party	Candidate	Votes	%	±%
Conservative	Mr D N Britton	1,723	37.5	
Liberal Democrats	Mr D E Leggatt	1,254	27.3	
Labour	Mr D F Dyball	1,206	26.3	
UKIP	Mr H F Whitaker	411	8.9	
Majority		469	10.2	
Turnout		4,594	64.9	
Conservative win (new seat)				
