= Littlehampton Town (electoral division) =

Electoral division of West Sussex, England

Coordinates: 50.80794°N 0.54520°W

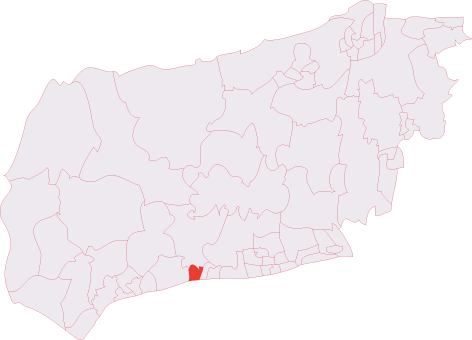
Littlehampton Town
Shown within West Sussex
District:	Arun
UK Parliament Constituency:	Bognor Regis & Littlehampton
Ceremonial county:	West Sussex
Electorate (2009):	8163
County Councillor
Ian Buckland (LD)

Littlehampton Town is an electoral division of West Sussex in the United Kingdom and returns one member to sit on West Sussex County Council.

== Extent ==
The division covers the western part of the town of Littlehampton.

It comprises the following Arun District wards: River and the southern portion of Courtwick with Toddington and falls completely within the civil parish of Littlehampton.

== Election results ==
=== 2013 Election ===
Results of the election held on 2 May 2013:

Littlehampton Town
Party	Candidate	Votes	%	±%
Liberal Democrats	Ian Buckland	658	30.6	+4.5
UKIP	Bill Watkins	576	26.8	+6.8
Labour	George O'Neill	463	21.5	0.0
Conservative	David Britton	348	16.1	−12.6
Independent	David Jones	106	4.9	N/A
Majority		82	3.8	
Turnout		2,151	27.7	−3.7
Liberal Democrats gain from Conservative		Swing		

=== 2009 Election ===
Results of the election held on 4 June 2009:

Littlehampton Town
Party	Candidate	Votes	%	±%
Conservative	David Britton	757	28.7	+1.8
Liberal Democrats	Ian Buckland	689	26.1	+2.1
Labour	George O'Neill	568	21.5	−15.6
UKIP	Derek Pescud	476	18.0	+6.0
BNP	Val Manchee	149	5.6	N/A
Majority		68	2.6	
Turnout		2,639	32.3	−21.2
Conservative gain from Labour		Swing		

=== 2005 Election ===
Results of the election held on 5 May 2005:

Littlehampton Town
Party	Candidate	Votes	%	±%
Labour	George O’Neill	1,399	37.1	
Conservative	Alan Gammon	1,016	26.9	
Liberal Democrats	David Jones	903	24.0	
UKIP	Mary Lees	452	12.0	
Majority		383	10.2	
Turnout		3,770	53.5	
Labour win (new seat)				
