= Bognor Regis West & Aldwick (electoral division) =

Electoral division of West Sussex, England

Coordinates: 50.78195°N 0.69643°W

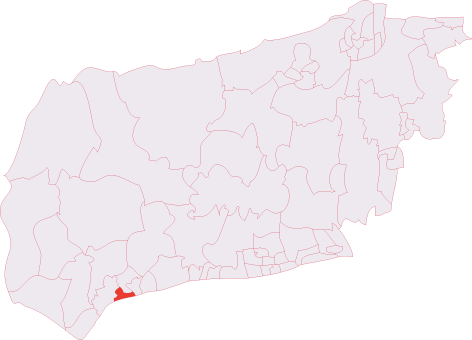
Bognor Regis West & Aldwick
Shown within West Sussex
District:	Arun
UK Parliament Constituency:	Bognor Regis & Littlehampton
Ceremonial county:	West Sussex
Electorate (2009):	9061
County Councillor
Ashvin Patel (Con)

Bognor Regis West & Aldwick is an electoral division of West Sussex in the United Kingdom and returns one member to sit on West Sussex County Council.

== Extent ==
The division covers the western half of the town of Bognor Regis; the communities of Aldwick and West Meads; and the northern part of Rose Green.

It comprises the following Arun District wards: Aldwick East Ward, the northern part of Aldwick West Ward and Marine Ward; and of the following civil parishes: the eastern part of Aldwick and the southwestern part of Bognor Regis.

== Election results ==
=== 2013 Election ===
Results of the election held on 2 May 2013:

Bognor Regis West & Aldwick
Party	Candidate	Votes	%	±%
Conservative	Ashvin Patel	1,159	36.4	−6.4
UKIP	Janet Taylor	968	30.4	N/A
Liberal Democrats	Paul Wells	873	27.4	−16.9
Labour	Richard Dawson	186	5.8	−0.1
Majority		191	6.0	
Turnout		3,186	35.9	−4.2
Conservative gain from Liberal Democrats		Swing		

=== 2009 Election ===
Results of the election held on 4 June 2009:

Bognor Regis West & Aldwick
Party	Candidate	Votes	%	±%
Liberal Democrats	Paul Wells	1,606	44.3	+4.8
Conservative	Robin Brown	1,545	42.8	−3.3
BNP	David Little	264	7.3	+7.3
Labour	Jan Cosgrave	214	5.9	+5.9
Majority		61	1.5	
Turnout		3,629	40.1	−21.8
Liberal Democrats gain from Conservative		Swing		

=== 2005 Election ===
Results of the election held on 5 May 2005:

Bognor Regis West & Aldwick
Party	Candidate	Votes	%	±%
Conservative	Mr R B Brown	2,171	46.1	
Liberal Democrats	Mr B Dodd	1,860	39.5	
UKIP	Mr I A Fraser	679	14.4	
Majority		311	6.6	
Turnout		4,710	61.9	
Conservative win (new seat)				
