= Roffey (electoral division) =

Coordinates: 51.07862°N 0.29423°W

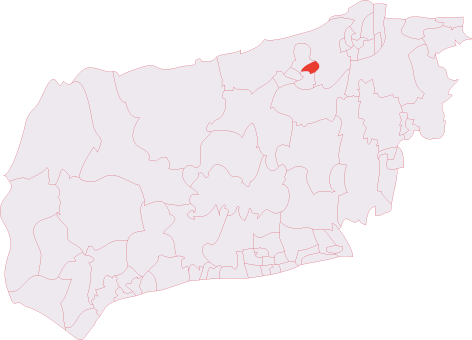
Roffey
Shown within West Sussex
District:	Horsham
UK Parliament Constituency:	Horsham
Ceremonial county:	West Sussex
Electorate (2009):	7621
County Councillor
Jim Rae (Con)

Roffey is an electoral division of West Sussex in the United Kingdom and returns one member to sit on West Sussex County Council.

== Extent ==
The division covers the neighbourhoods of Littlehaven and Roffey, which form part of the urban area of the town of Horsham.

It comprises the following Horsham District wards: Roffey North Ward and the eastern part of Roffey South Ward; and the eastern part of North Horsham civil parish.

== Election results ==
=== 2013 Election ===
Results of the election held on 2 May 2013:

Roffey
Party	Candidate	Votes	%	±%
Conservative	Jim Rae	753	32.4	−6.0
UKIP	Mike Rowlands	728	31.4	N/A
Liberal Democrats	Warwick Hellawell	597	25.7	−22.7
Labour	George Murrell	244	10.5	+6.4
Majority		25	1.0	N/A
Turnout		2,322	30.0	−9.8
Conservative gain from Liberal Democrats		Swing		

=== 2009 Election ===
Results of the election held on 4 June 2009:

Roffey
Party	Candidate	Votes	%	±%
Liberal Democrats	Warwick Hellawell	1,468	48.4	+2.9
Conservative	John Charles	1,164	38.4	−0.4
BNP	Colin Poulter	279	9.2	+9.2
Labour	Andrew Skudder	123	4.1	−11.6
Majority		304	10.0	+3.3
Turnout		3,034	39.8	−24.5
Liberal Democrats hold		Swing		

=== 2005 Election ===
Results of the election held on 5 May 2005:

Roffey
Party	Candidate	Votes	%	±%
Liberal Democrats	Mr W J Hellawell	2,751	45.5	
Conservative	Mr J W Charles	2,347	38.8	
Labour	Mr R M Wilson	946	15.7	
Majority		404	6.7	
Turnout		6,044	64.3	
Liberal Democrats win (new seat)				
