= Horsham Hurst (electoral division) =

Coordinates: 51.06880°N 0.33251°W

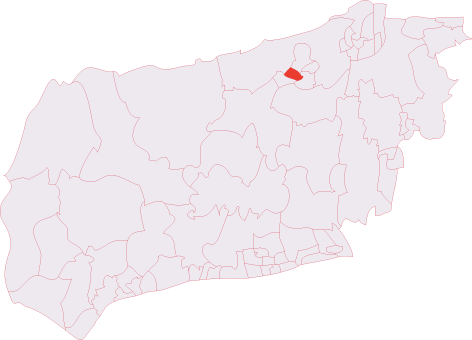
Horsham Hurst
Shown within West Sussex
District:	Horsham
UK Parliament Constituency:	Horsham
Ceremonial county:	West Sussex
Electorate (2009):	7906
County Councillor
Nigel Dennis (LD)

Horsham Hurst is an electoral division of West Sussex in the United Kingdom and returns one member to sit on West Sussex County Council.

== Extent ==
The division covers the western part of the town of Horsham.

It comprises the following Horsham District wards: the western part of Horsham Park Ward and Trafalgar Ward.

== Election results ==
=== 2013 Election ===
Results of the election held on 2 May 2013:

Horsham Hurst
Party	Candidate	Votes	%	±%
Liberal Democrats	Nigel Dennis	1,225	44.4	−6.4
Conservative	Keith Bridgeman	679	24.6	−1.7
UKIP	Claire Bridewell	537	19.4	+10.5
Labour	Carol Hayton	321	11.6	+6.1
Majority		546	19.8	−4.7
Turnout		2,762	34.2	−7.9
Liberal Democrats hold		Swing	-4.7%	

=== 2009 Election ===
Results of the election held on 4 June 2009:

Horsham Hurst
Party	Candidate	Votes	%	±%
Liberal Democrats	Nigel Dennis	1,697	50.8	
Conservative	Marc Kent	879	26.3	
UKIP	Claire Bridewell	279	8.3	
Green	Stacey Frier	187	5.6	
Labour	Carol Hayton	183	5.5	
BNP	Joyce Audric	118	3.5	
Majority		818	24.5	
Turnout		3,343	42.3	
Liberal Democrats win (new seat)				

This division as it came into existence as the result of a boundary review recommended by the Boundary Committee for England, the results of which were accepted by the Electoral Commission in March 2009.
