= Rustington (electoral division) =

Electoral division of West Sussex, England

Coordinates: 50.80960°N 0.50541°W

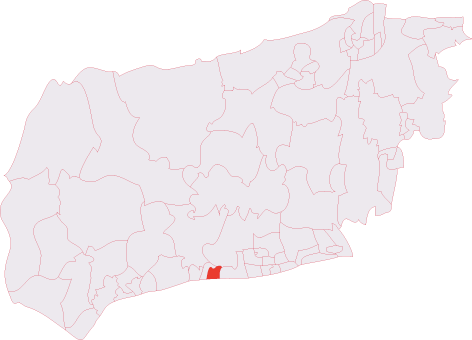
Rustington
Shown within West Sussex
District:	Arun
UK Parliament Constituency:	Worthing West
Ceremonial county:	West Sussex
Electorate (2009):	9448
County Councillor
Daniel Purchese (LD)

Rustington is an electoral division of West Sussex in England and returns one member to sit on West Sussex County Council.

== Extent ==
The division covers the village of Rustington, which forms part of the urban area of the town of Littlehampton.

It comprises the following Arun District wards: Rustington East Ward and the south part of Rustington West Ward; and falls entirely within the civil parish of Rustington.

== Election results ==
=== 2017 Election ===
Results of the election held on 4 May 2017:

Rustington
Party	Candidate	Votes	%	±%
Liberal Democrats	Daniel Purchase	1,970	46.0	+37.3
Conservative	Graham Tyler	1,853	43.3	−2.6
Labour	Nigel Stapley	237	5.5	−4.5
UKIP	Susan Waghorn	220	5.1	−30.3
Majority		117	2.7	
Turnout		4,280	44.1	+8.8
Liberal Democrats gain from Conservative		Swing	+20.0	

=== 2013 Election ===
Results of the election held on 2 May 2013:

Rustington
Party	Candidate	Votes	%	±%
Conservative	Graham Tyler	1,560	45.9	−23.3
UKIP	Janet Penn	1,203	35.4	N/A
Labour	Tony Dines	340	10.0	+2.7
Liberal Democrats	Val Capon	295	8.7	−14.5
Majority		357	10.5	−35.9
Turnout		3,398	35.3	−9.8
Conservative hold		Swing		

=== 2009 Election ===
Results of the election held on 4 June 2009:

Rustington
Party	Candidate	Votes	%	±%
Conservative	Graham Tyler	2,962	69.6	+23.5
Liberal Democrats	John Lovell	986	23.2	−9.0
Labour	Tony Dines	310	7.3	−7.5
Majority		1,976	46.4	+32.6
Turnout		4,258	45.1	−22.9
Conservative hold		Swing		

=== 2005 Election ===
Results of the election held on 5 May 2005:

Rustington
Party	Candidate	Votes	%	±%
Conservative	Mr P T Moor	2,817	46.1	
Liberal Democrats	Mr A S D Lauretani	1,971	32.3	
Labour	Mr A J Dines	904	14.8	
UKIP	Ms J A Penn	413	6.8	
Majority		846	13.8	
Turnout		6,105	68.0	
Conservative win (new seat)				
