= 2013 West Sussex County Council election =

2013 UK local government election

- 2 May 2013

All 71 seats to West Sussex County Council 36 seats needed for a majority
	First party	Second party
Party	Conservative	UKIP
Seats won	46	10
Seat change	▼3	▲8
	Third party	Fourth party
Party	Liberal Democrats	Labour
Seats won	8	6
Seat change	▼10	▲3
- Map showing the results of the 2013 West Sussex County Council elections.
Council control before election
Conservative
Council control after election
Conservative

The West Sussex County Council election, 2013 took place on 2 May 2013, as part of the 2013 United Kingdom local elections. All 71 electoral divisions were up for election, which returned one county councillor each by first-past-the-post voting for a four-year term of office. At this election, the Conservative Party was seeking to retain overall control of the council, and the Liberal Democrats to maintain their position as the main opposition party.

All locally registered electors (British, Irish, Commonwealth and European Union citizens) who were aged 18 or over on Thursday 2 May 2013 were entitled to vote in the local elections. Those who were temporarily away from their ordinary address (for example, away working, on holiday, in student accommodation or in hospital) were also entitled to vote in the local elections, although those who had moved abroad and registered as overseas electors cannot vote in the local elections. It is possible to register to vote at more than one address (such as a university student who had a term-time address and lives at home during holidays) at the discretion of the local Electoral Register Office, but it remains an offence to vote more than once in the same local government election.

== Summary ==
The Conservative Party, who have controlled the council since 1997, retained control with a majority of 10 seats, a loss of three seats compared to the 2009 result. The Conservative Party also retained Imberdown which had been gained due to a defection from the Liberal Democrats.

The United Kingdom Independence Party (UKIP) won 10 seats to become the official opposition on the council, a net gain of 8 seats. In the intervening period since the last election UKIP gained two seats by defection from the Conservatives, Kingston Buci and Worthing West, UKIP failed to retain either seat. The Liberal Democrats lost 11 seats and gained 1 seat, leaving them with a total of 8 seats. Labour gained 4 seats from the Conservatives, but lost Haywards Heath Town to the Conservative, which Labour had gained by defection from the Liberal Democrats. Labour won a total of 6 seats, all in the Borough of Crawley.

Of the parties that did not gain any representation on the council. only the Green Party contested more than one electoral division. The Green Party lost its only county councillor, who had defected from the Liberal Democrats.

An independent gained Midhurst division from the Conservatives. The Conservative candidate for the Division of Midhurst was forced to resign from the Conservative Party, but did so after the close of nomination and date to withdraw nominations, meaning their name remained on the ballot paper. This was due to comments made regarding the potential admissions policy of a proposed new boarding school in West Sussex.

== Election results summary ==
West Sussex County Council election, 2013
Party	Seats	Gains	Losses	Net gain/loss	Seats %	Votes %	Votes	+/−
Conservative	46	13	16	-3	64.8	38.4	71,618	-10.00%
UKIP	10	10	2	+8	14.1	29.3	54,751	+20.75%
Liberal Democrats	8	1	11	-10	11.3	14.4	26,882	-14.86%
Labour	6	4	1	+3	8.5	13.9	26,036	+5.42%
Independent	1	1	0	+1	1.4	1.3	2,377	+0.67%
Green	0	0	1	-1	0.0	2.5	4,758	+0.29%
Peace	0	0	0	0	0.0	0.05	102	-0.02%
BNP	0	0	0	0	0.0	0.03	57	-1.98%
Socialist Labour	0	0	0	0	0.0	0.02	42	N/A
Justice	0	0	0	0	0.0	0.02	40	-0.03%
Patria	0	0	0	0	0.0	0.01	26	N/A

== Results by electoral division ==
West Sussex is composed of 7 districts: Adur District, Arun District, Chichester District, Crawley Borough, Horsham District, Mid Sussex District and Worthing Borough. The following results are grouped by district.

=== Adur ===
Kingston Buci
Party	Candidate	Votes	%	±%
Conservative	Peter Metcalf	823	35.9	−9.9
UKIP	Paul Graysmark	747	32.6	+11.4
Labour	Sami Zeglam	443	19.3	+2.0
Green	Helen Mears	173	7.6	+7.6
Liberal Democrats	Cyril Cannings	115	5.0	−10.7
Majority		76	2.7	−21.9
Turnout		2,291	29.7	−5.4
Conservative gain from UKIP		Swing		

Lancing
Party	Candidate	Votes	%	±%
UKIP	Mike Glennon	1,323	53.8	+25.0
Conservative	Angie Mills	505	20.5	−13.9
Labour	Douglas Bradley	272	11.1	+2.7
Liberal Democrats	Stephen Martin	243	9.9	−19.5
Green	Louise Carroll	117	4.8	+4.8
Majority		818	33.3	
Turnout		2,460	29.8	−1.8
UKIP gain from Conservative		Swing		

Saltings
Party	Candidate	Votes	%	±%
UKIP	Mick Clark	769	34.7	+8.9
Conservative	Dave Simmons	697	31.5	−6.6
Labour	David Devoy	328	14.8	+5.9
Green	Jennie Tindall	266	12.0	−0.1
Liberal Democrats	Doris Martin	155	7.0	−8.1
Majority		72	3.2	
Turnout		2,215	26.3	−10.9
UKIP gain from Conservative		Swing	+7.7%	

Shoreham
Party	Candidate	Votes	%	±%
Conservative	Debbie Kennard	1,037	46.3	−2.8
UKIP	Clive Burghard	507	22.6	+9.2
Labour	Irene Reed	321	14.3	+5.6
Green	Lynn Finnigan	232	10.4	−5.9
Liberal Democrats	John Hilditch	142	6.3	−6.2
Majority		530	23.7	−9.1
Turnout		2,239	29.5	−3.3
Conservative hold		Swing		

Sompting & North Lancing
Party	Candidate	Votes	%	±%
UKIP	Lionel Parsons	1,144	45.5	+20.9
Conservative	Carson Albury	773	30.7	−14.6
Labour	Alun Jones	368	14.6	+2.4
Green	Simon Williams	124	4.9	+4.9
Liberal Democrats	Patricia Izod	107	4.3	−13.7
Majority		371	14.8	
Turnout		2,516	28.9	−6.4
UKIP gain from Conservative		Swing	+17.8%	

Southwick
Party	Candidate	Votes	%	±%
Conservative	Janet Mockridge	738	36.2	−6.4
UKIP	Jenny Greig	611	30.0	+6.8
Labour	Brian Hall	426	20.9	+9.8
Liberal Democrats	David Edey	160	7.8	−6.2
Green	Moyra Martin	105	5.1	−4.5
Majority		127	6.2	−13.2
Turnout		2,040	25.6	−7.5
Conservative hold		Swing	-6.6%	

=== Arun ===
Angmering & Findon
Party	Candidate	Votes	%	±%
Conservative	Deborah Urquhart	1,100	44.0	−22.6
UKIP	Tricia Wales	941	37.6	N/A
Liberal Democrats	Jamie Bennett	232	9.2	−24.2
Labour	James Elwood	228	9.1	+9.1
Majority		159	6.4	−26.8
Turnout		2,501	31.2	−8.5
Conservative hold		Swing		

Arundel & Wick
Party	Candidate	Votes	%	±%
Conservative	Nigel Peters	967	42.1	−14.1
UKIP	Jeannie Dunning	783	34.1	N/A
Labour	Alan Butcher	387	16.9	+7.6
Liberal Democrats	Nick Wiltshire	161	7.0	−27.4
Majority		184	8.0	−13.8
Turnout		2,298	27.7	−10.5
Conservative hold		Swing		

Bersted
Party	Candidate	Votes	%	±%
UKIP	Ann Rapnik	1,044	41.0	+23.9
Liberal Democrats	Simon M^{c}Dougall	526	20.7	−12.5
Labour	Roger Nash	512	20.1	+9.2
Conservative	Paul Dendle	462	18.2	−11.0
Majority		518	20.4	
Turnout		2,544	28.2	−5.9
UKIP gain from Liberal Democrats		Swing		

Bognor Regis East
Party	Candidate	Votes	%	±%
Liberal Democrats	Francis Oppler	763	35.2	−10.7
UKIP	Derek Ambler	733	33.8	+15.2
Labour	Jan Cosgrove	351	16.2	+16.2
Conservative	David Edwards	322	14.8	−10.7
Majority		30	1.4	−19.0
Turnout		2,169	24.4	−5.5
Liberal Democrats hold		Swing		

Bognor Regis West & Aldwick
Party	Candidate	Votes	%	±%
Conservative	Ashvin Patel	1,159	36.4	−6.4
UKIP	Janet Taylor	968	30.4	N/A
Liberal Democrats	Paul Wells	873	27.4	−16.9
Labour	Richard Dawson	186	5.8	−0.1
Majority		191	6.0	
Turnout		3,186	35.9	−4.2
Conservative gain from Liberal Democrats		Swing		

East Preston & Ferring
Party	Candidate	Votes	%	±%
Conservative	Peter Evans	1,804	49.3	−16.7
UKIP	Phil Ruddock	1,142	31.2	N/A
Labour	Ed Miller	527	14.4	+5.7
Liberal Democrats	Trevor Richards	187	5.1	−9.4
Majority		662	18.1	−33.4
Turnout		3,660	36.6	−9.3
Conservative hold		Swing		

Felpham
Party	Candidate	Votes	%	±%
UKIP	Graham Jones	989	35.1	+11.2
Conservative	George Blampied	926	32.8	−21.7
Independent	Sandra Daniells	660	23.4	N/A
Labour	Steve M^{c}Connell	154	5.5	−0.7
Liberal Democrats	David Meagher	90	3.2	−12.2
Majority		63	2.3	
Turnout		2,819	35.2	−4.1
UKIP gain from Conservative		Swing	+16.5%	

Fontwell
Party	Candidate	Votes	%	±%
Conservative	Derek Whittington	1,176	44.3	−20.0
UKIP	Graham Draper	907	34.2	N/A
Liberal Democrats	Stephen White	338	12.7	−23.0
Labour	John Mayes	177	6.7	N/A
BNP	John Robinson	57	2.1	N/A
Majority		269	10.1	−18.5
Turnout		2,655	29.6	−10.3
Conservative hold		Swing		

Littlehampton East
Party	Candidate	Votes	%	±%
Liberal Democrats	James Walsh	1,106	39.1	−6.0
UKIP	Geoff Holloway	772	27.3	+11.0
Conservative	Emma Neno	737	26.1	−3.7
Labour	Christine Macdonald	214	7.6	+2.3
Majority		434	11.8	−1.7
Turnout		2,829	32.1	−5.9
Liberal Democrats hold		Swing		

Littlehampton Town
Party	Candidate	Votes	%	±%
Liberal Democrats	Ian Buckland	658	30.6	+4.5
UKIP	Bill Watkins	576	26.8	+6.8
Labour	George O'Neill	463	21.5	±0.0
Conservative	David Britton	348	16.1	−12.6
Independent	David Jones	106	4.9	+4.9
Majority		82	3.8	
Turnout		2,151	27.7	−3.7
Liberal Democrats gain from Conservative		Swing		

Middleton
Party	Candidate	Votes	%	±%
UKIP	Joan Phillips	1,181	44.2	+16.7
Conservative	Hilary Flynn	1,099	41.2	−7.7
Labour	Gilbert Cockburn	268	10.0	+3.6
Liberal Democrats	Conrad Meagher	121	7.2	−8.9
Majority		82	3.0	
Turnout		2,669	31.5	−7.7
UKIP gain from Conservative		Swing	+12.2%	

Nyetimber
Party	Candidate	Votes	%	±%
UKIP	Tony Sutcliffe	1,503	48.9	+24.3
Conservative	Mike Coleman	1,058	34.4	−13.3
Labour	Pauline Nash	309	10.1	+4.5
Liberal Democrats	Gregory Burt	203	6.6	−7.9
Majority		445	14.5	
Turnout		3,073	33.0	−8.2
UKIP gain from Conservative		Swing	+18.8%	

Rustington
Party	Candidate	Votes	%	±%
Conservative	Graham Tyler	1,560	45.9	−23.3
UKIP	Janet Penn	1,203	35.4	N/A
Labour	Tony Dines	340	10.0	+2.7
Liberal Democrats	Val Capon	295	8.7	−14.5
Majority		357	10.5	−35.9
Turnout		3,398	35.3	−9.8
Conservative hold		Swing		

=== Chichester ===
Bourne
Party	Candidate	Votes	%	±%
UKIP	Sandra James	1,241	40.6	N/A
Conservative	Mark Dunn	1,158	37.9	−18.4
Liberal Democrats	Jonathan Brown	360	11.8	−28.2
Labour	Theo Child	295	9.7	+6.0
Majority		83	2.7	+2.7
Turnout		3,054	31.8	−5.3
UKIP gain from Conservative		Swing		

Chichester East
Party	Candidate	Votes	%	±%
Conservative	Simon Oakley	894	35.0	−0.6
Liberal Democrats	Andrew Smith	663	26.0	−26.3
UKIP	Alicia Denny	648	25.4	N/A
Labour	Ben Earnshaw-Mansell	349	13.7	+7.7
Majority		231	9.0	+9.0
Turnout		2,554	24.4	−10.1
Conservative gain from Liberal Democrats		Swing	+12.9%	

Chichester North
Party	Candidate	Votes	%	±%
Conservative	Jeremy Hunt	1,431	49.8	−2.6
UKIP	Michael Mason	675	23.5	+11.4
Liberal Democrats	John Illenden	464	16.2	−14.6
Labour	Michael Waite	303	10.5	+5.9
Majority		756	26.3	+4.7
Turnout		2,873	31.9	−12.1
Conservative hold		Swing		

Chichester South
Party	Candidate	Votes	%	±%
Conservative	Margaret Whitehead	1,024	40.1	−2.8
UKIP	Nigel Sitwell	672	26.3	+8.7
Liberal Democrats	Michael Woolley	508	19.9	−12.4
Labour	James Hobson	348	13.6	+6.3
Majority		352	13.8	+3.2
Turnout		2,552	27.6	−9.1
Conservative hold		Swing	-5.8%	

Chichester West
Party	Candidate	Votes	%	±%
Conservative	Louise Goldsmith	1,691	54.6	−0.4
UKIP	Douglas Denny	716	23.1	+13.6
Liberal Democrats	Jon Stevens	339	10.9	−6.5
Labour	John Bennett	326	10.5	+5.5
Patria	Andrew Emerson	26	0.8	N/A
Majority		975	31.5	−6.1
Turnout		3,098	32.2	−10.8
Conservative hold		Swing	-7.0%	

Fernhurst
Party	Candidate	Votes	%	±%
Conservative	Michael Brown	1,350	51.0	−3.9
UKIP	Andrew Moncreiff	700	26.4	+8.7
Liberal Democrats	David Martin-Jenkins	339	12.8	−9.9
Labour	John Smith	259	9.8	+5.1
Majority		650	24.5	−7.7
Turnout		2,648	30.0	−12.9
Conservative hold		Swing	-6.3%	

Midhurst
Party	Candidate	Votes	%	±%
Independent	Gordon M^{c}Ara	864	31.4	N/A
Conservative	John Cherry	742	26.9	−51.3
UKIP	Pamela Hayton	549	19.9	−1.9
Independent	Margaret Guest	292	10.6	N/A
Liberal Democrats	Bob Green	197	7.2	N/A
Labour	Frances Turner	110	4.0	N/A
Majority		122	4.5	N/A
Turnout		2,754	31.1	+5.6
Independent gain from Conservative		Swing		

Petworth
Party	Candidate	Votes	%	±%
Conservative	Janet Duncton	1,703	54.8	−15.5
UKIP	Julian Batchelor	809	26.0	N/A
Liberal Democrats	Karon Read	394	12.7	−7.9
Labour	Philip Robinson	201	6.5	+2.7
Majority		894	28.8	−20.9
Turnout		3,107	31.7	−9.6
Conservative hold		Swing		

Selsey
Party	Candidate	Votes	%	±%
UKIP	Bernard Smith	1,201	45.8	+5.8
Conservative	Roland O'Brien	1,091	41.6	−5.5
Labour	Ian Bell	332	12.7	−0.1
Majority		110	4.2	
Turnout		2,624	29.9	−6.7
UKIP gain from Conservative		Swing	+5.7%	

The Witterings
Party	Candidate	Votes	%	±%
Conservative	Pieter Montyn	1,265	51.5	+1.9
UKIP	Roger Wilson	829	33.7	N/A
Labour	Joe O'Sullivan	214	8.7	+3.3
Liberal Democrats	Gillian Gardner	150	6.1	−4.5
Majority		436	17.8	−13.0
Turnout		2,458	29.8	−10.3
Conservative hold		Swing		

=== Crawley ===
Bewbush & Ifield West
Party	Candidate	Votes	%	±%
Labour	Chris Oxlade	927	48.6	+12.6
UKIP	Norman Aston	492	25.8	N/A
Conservative	Duncan Peck	378	19.8	−11.7
Liberal Democrats	Lucy-Marie Nelson	70	3.7	−10.6
Justice	Arshad Khan	40	2.1	−2.9
Majority		435	22.8	+18.3
Turnout		1,907	22.5	−6.0
Labour hold		Swing		

Broadfield
Party	Candidate	Votes	%	±%
Labour	Brian Quinn	1,084	50.5	+8.7
Conservative	Lee Gilroy	494	23.0	−35.2
UKIP	Mia Bristow	476	22.2	N/A
Liberal Democrats	Keith Sunderland	51	2.4	N/A
Socialist Labour	Derek Isaacs	42	2.0	N/A
Majority		590	27.5	
Turnout		2,147	23.3	−3.6
Labour gain from Conservative		Swing	+22.0%	

Gossops Green & Ifield East
Party	Candidate	Votes	%	±%
Labour	Sue Mullins	1,109	41.0	+13.1
Conservative	Ken Trussell	720	26.6	−12.0
UKIP	Stephen Wade	705	26.1	N/A
Green	Iain Dickson	106	3.9	N/A
Liberal Democrats	Gregory-George Collins	62	2.3	−8.2
Majority		389	14.4	
Turnout		2,702	32.3	−5.8
Labour gain from Conservative		Swing	+12.6%	

Langley Green & West Green
Party	Candidate	Votes	%	±%
Labour	Brenda Smith	1,558	58.4	+12.9
UKIP	Peter Brent	533	20.0	N/A
Conservative	Vanessa Cumper	499	18.7	−18.5
Liberal Democrats	Kevin Osborne	77	2.9	−14.4
Majority		1,025	38.4	+30.1
Turnout		2,667	27.9	−5.4
Labour hold		Swing		

Maidenbower
Party	Candidate	Votes	%	±%
Conservative	Bob Lanzer	1,165	50.3	−22.0
Labour	Peter Smith	506	21.8	+7.8
UKIP	Simon Mizzi	462	19.9	N/A
Green	Ben Liles	104	4.5	+4.5
Liberal Democrats	Bill Morrison	79	3.4	−10.3
Majority		659	28.5	−6.3
Turnout		2,316	24.9	−9.9
Conservative hold		Swing	-14.9%	

Northgate & Three Bridges
Party	Candidate	Votes	%	±%
Labour	Peter Lamb	1,065	40.2	+9.6
Conservative	Bob Burgess	894	33.8	−6.4
UKIP	Andrew Gill	562	21.2	N/A
Liberal Democrats	David Anderson	127	4.8	−12.5
Majority		171	6.4	N/A
Turnout		2,648	31.9	−4.9
Labour gain from Conservative		Swing	+8.0%	

Pound Hill & Worth
Party	Candidate	Votes	%	±%
Conservative	Richard Burrett	1,493	54.0	−15.7
UKIP	John MacCanna	545	20.6	N/A
Labour	David Shreeves	413	15.6	+4.7
Green	Susi Liles	113	4.3	N/A
Liberal Democrats	Graham Knight	83	3.1	−16.2
Majority		948	33.4	−17.0
Turnout		2,647	30.3	−8.8
Conservative hold		Swing		

Southgate & Crawley Central
Party	Candidate	Votes	%	±%
Labour	Michael Jones	774	36.8	−2.6
Conservative	Howard Bloom	655	31.2	−17.0
UKIP	David Matthews	482	22.9	N/A
Green	Malcolm Liles	133	6.3	N/A
Liberal Democrats	Anthony Millson	57	2.7	N/A
Majority		119	5.6	
Turnout		2,101	27.1	−7.6
Labour gain from Conservative		Swing	+7.2%	

Tilgate & Furnace Green
Party	Candidate	Votes	%	±%
Conservative	Duncan Crow	1,461	44.3	−1.7
Labour	Colin Moffatt	1,054	31.9	+6.9
UKIP	Graham Harper	544	16.5	N/A
Green	Derek Hardman	124	3.8	N/A
Liberal Democrats	John Lovell	62	1.9	N/A
Independent	Richard Symonds	56	1.7	N/A
Majority		407	12.4	−8.6
Turnout		3,301	37.3	−2.4
Conservative hold		Swing	-4.3%	

=== Horsham ===
Billingshurst
Party	Candidate	Votes	%	±%
Conservative	Amanda Jupp	1,013	42.8	−11.3
UKIP	David Duke	919	38.8	+16.7
Liberal Democrats	Gillian Knight	228	9.6	−9.1
Labour	Keith Maslin	206	8.7	+3.6
Majority		994	4.0	−28.0
Turnout		2,366	27.6	−10.8
Conservative hold		Swing	-14.0%	

Bramber Castle
Party	Candidate	Votes	%	±%
Conservative	David Barling	1,322	42.3	+6.1
Liberal Democrats	Jessica Sproxton-Miller	848	27.1	−21.7
UKIP	Mike Grizzard	670	21.4	+13.8
Labour	Adrian Norridge	288	9.2	+6.7
Majority		474	15.2	
Turnout		3,128	34.2	−16.6
Conservative gain from Liberal Democrats		Swing	+13.9%	

Henfield
Party	Candidate	Votes	%	±%
Conservative	Lionel Barnard	1,248	51.4	−12.1
UKIP	Liz Wallace	723	29.8	N/A
Liberal Democrats	Andrew Purches	255	10.5	−13.2
Labour	Janet Miller	204	8.4	+2.9
Majority		525	21.6	−18.2
Turnout		2,430	28.9	−13.4
Conservative hold		Swing		

Holbrook
Party	Candidate	Votes	%	±%
Conservative	Peter Catchpole	1,237	46.2	−0.9
UKIP	Sally Wilkins	678	25.3	N/A
Liberal Democrats	Leonard Crosbie	487	18.2	−25.1
Labour	Sheila Chapman	273	10.2	+6.7
Majority		559	20.9	+17.1
Turnout		2,675	30.4	−12.6
Conservative hold		Swing		

Horsham Hurst
Party	Candidate	Votes	%	±%
Liberal Democrats	Nigel Dennis	1,225	44.4	−6.4
Conservative	Keith Bridgeman	679	24.6	−1.7
UKIP	Claire Bridewell	537	19.4	+10.5
Labour	Carol Hayton	321	11.6	+6.1
Majority		546	19.8	−4.7
Turnout		2,762	34.2	−7.9
Liberal Democrats hold		Swing	-4.7%	

Horsham Riverside
Party	Candidate	Votes	%	±%
Liberal Democrats	Morwen Millson	1,053	39.0	−16.7
Conservative	David Scozzafava	683	25.3	−10.7
UKIP	Douglas Rands	620	23.0	N/A
Labour	David Hide	239	8.9	+5.1
Peace	Jim Duggan	102	3.8	−0.7
Majority		370	13.7	−6.0
Turnout		2,697	32.8	−11.8
Liberal Democrats hold		Swing	-3.0%	

Horsham Tanbridge & Broadbridge Heath
Party	Candidate	Votes	%	±%
Liberal Democrats	David Sheldon	721	35.7	−20.4
Conservative	Ronald Vimpany	551	27.3	−11.3
UKIP	Martin Bridewell	537	26.6	N/A
Labour	Raymond Chapman	212	10.5	+5.2
Majority		170	8.4	−9.1
Turnout		2,021	29.2	−10.0
Liberal Democrats hold		Swing		

Pulborough
Party	Candidate	Votes	%	±%
Conservative	Pat Arculus	1,380	43.7	−29.5
UKIP	John Wallace	1,159	36.7	N/A
Independent	Tom Williams	286	9.1	N/A
Liberal Democrats	Rosalyn Deedman	175	5.5	−15.6
Labour	Antony Bignell	159	5.0	−0.7
Majority		221	7.0	−45.1
Turnout		3,159	32.7	−9.8
Conservative hold		Swing		

Roffey
Party	Candidate	Votes	%	±%
Conservative	Jim Rae	753	32.4	−6.0
UKIP	Mike Rowlands	728	31.4	N/A
Liberal Democrats	Warwick Hellawell	597	25.7	−22.7
Labour	George Murrell	244	10.5	+6.4
Majority		25	1.0	
Turnout		2,322	30.0	−9.8
Conservative gain from Liberal Democrats		Swing		

Southwater & Nuthurst
Party	Candidate	Votes	%	±%
Conservative	Brad Watson	1,263	41.4	−8.2
UKIP	Stuart Aldridge	1,094	35.8	+22.5
Liberal Democrats	Peter Stainton	492	16.1	−11.4
Labour	Jacqueline Little	203	6.7	+3.8
Majority		169	5.6	−16.5
Turnout		3,052	30.4	−6.1
Conservative hold		Swing	-15.4%	

Storrington
Party	Candidate	Votes	%	±%
Conservative	Frank Wilkinson	1,580	47.9	−16.1
UKIP	Graham Croft-Smith	1,252	38.0	N/A
Liberal Democrats	Nick Hopkinson	464	14.1	−4.3
Majority		328	9.9	−35.7
Turnout		3,296	33.1	−10.0
Conservative hold		Swing		

Warnham & Rusper
Party	Candidate	Votes	%	±%
Conservative	Mick Hodgson	1,228	55.0	−3.9
UKIP	Geoff Stevens	673	30.2	+10.9
Liberal Democrats	Ian Shepherd	331	14.8	−2.9
Majority		555	24.8	−14.8
Turnout		2,232	30.2	−11.5
Conservative hold		Swing	-7.4%	

=== Mid Sussex ===
Burgess Hill East
Party	Candidate	Votes	%	±%
Conservative	Anne Jones	1,127	33.9	−11.6
UKIP	Kevin Walker	847	25.5	N/A
Liberal Democrats	Sue Knight	601	18.1	−31.9
Labour	Tony Balsdon	564	17.0	+12.5
Green	Anne Eves	185	5.6	+5.6
Majority		280	8.4	
Turnout		3,324	35.0	−6.5
Conservative gain from Liberal Democrats		Swing		

Burgess Hill Town
Party	Candidate	Votes	%	±%
Conservative	Andrew Barrett-Miles	1,016	36.6	−3.5
UKIP	Chris French	709	25.5	+11.6
Liberal Democrats	Roger Cartwright	576	20.7	−20.8
Labour	Janet Smith	384	13.8	+9.4
Green	Victoria Grimmett	91	3.3	+3.3
Majority		307	11.1	
Turnout		2,776	30.6	−7.5
Conservative gain from Liberal Democrats		Swing		

Cuckfield & Lucastes
Party	Candidate	Votes	%	±%
Conservative	Pete Bradbury	1,282	48.6	+1.8
UKIP	Marc Montgomery	585	22.2	+16.2
Liberal Democrats	Stephen Blanch	470	17.8	−3.4
Labour	Sarah Moss	300	11.4	+8.8
Majority		697	26.4	+0.8
Turnout		2,637	33.0	−12.4
Conservative hold		Swing	-7.2%	

East Grinstead Meridian
Party	Candidate	Votes	%	±%
Conservative	Liz Bennett	1,006	48.0	+0.5
UKIP	Ian Simcock	507	24.2	N/A
Liberal Democrats	Jackie Beckford	307	14.7	−24.2
Labour	Andrew Skudder	163	7.8	+4.3
Green	Catherine Edminson	111	5.3	−4.8
Majority		499	23.8	+15.2
Turnout		2,094	24.9	−10.7
Conservative hold		Swing		

East Grinstead South & Ashurst Wood
Party	Candidate	Votes	%	±%
Conservative	John O'Brien	1,066	43.8	−0.7
UKIP	Tony Armstrong	562	23.1	N/A
Liberal Democrats	Howard Evans	461	18.9	−22.0
Green	Gary Hogman	188	7.7	−4.2
Labour	David Boot	158	6.5	−3.9
Majority		504	20.7	+17.1
Turnout		2,435	27.5	−13.7
Conservative hold		Swing		

Hassocks & Victoria
Party	Candidate	Votes	%	±%
Conservative	Andy Petch	1,464	41.4	−2.8
UKIP	Raplh Wylam	678	19.1	N/A
Liberal Democrats	Kristian Berggreen	635	17.8	−32.6
Labour	Linda Taylor	383	10.8	+6.0
Green	Victoria Standfast	285	8.0	N/A
Independent	Scott M^{c}Carthy	113	3.2	N/A
Majority		786	22.3	
Turnout		3,558	35.1	−8.8
Conservative gain from Liberal Democrats		Swing		

Haywards Heath East
Party	Candidate	Votes	%	±%
Conservative	John De Mierre	789	33.8	−5.9
UKIP	Charles Burrell	617	26.4	N/A
Labour	Richard Goddard	505	21.6	+8.1
Liberal Democrats	Anne Hall	424	18.2	−23.0
Majority		172	6.4	N/A
Turnout		2,335	29.7	−9.4
Conservative gain from Liberal Democrats		Swing		

Haywards Heath Town
Party	Candidate	Votes	%	±%
Conservative	Sujan Wickremaratchi	951	35.9	−6.3
UKIP	Howard Burrell	614	23.2	N/A
Liberal Democrats	Richard Bates	589	22.2	−23.8
Labour	Greg Mountain	495	18.7	+13.5
Majority		337	12.7	
Turnout		2,649	32.6	−7.9
Conservative gain from Liberal Democrats		Swing		

Hurstpierpoint & Bolney
Party	Candidate	Votes	%	±%
Conservative	Peter Griffiths	1,275	49.1	−9.3
UKIP	Ian Holt	487	18.8	N/A
Liberal Democrats	Rodney Jackson	341	13.1	−7.7
Green	Mike Airey	285	11.0	−4.1
Labour	David Chalkley	209	8.0	+2.3
Majority		788	30.3	−7.3
Turnout		2,597	32.9	−11.7
Conservative hold		Swing		

Imberdown
Party	Candidate	Votes	%	±%
Conservative	Heidi Brunsdon	1,065	43.2	+3.5
UKIP	Kevin Lindsay	799	32.4	+20.5
Liberal Democrats	Bob Mainstone	599	24.3	−19.8
Majority		266	10.8	
Turnout		2,463	29.9	−12.7
Conservative hold		Swing		

Lindfield & High Weald
Party	Candidate	Votes	%	±%
Conservative	Christine Field	1,633	49.2	−8.6
UKIP	Lesley Montgomery	662	19.9	N/A
Green	Paul Brown	500	15.1	−1.3
Liberal Democrats	Anne-Marie Lucraft	281	8.5	−13.6
Labour	Michael Amor	245	7.4	+3.8
Majority		971	29.3	−6.5
Turnout		3,321	35.1	−11.9
Conservative hold		Swing		

Worth Forest
Party	Candidate	Votes	%	±%
Conservative	Bill Acraman	1,200	44.1	−17.1
UKIP	Vivienne Etherton	815	30.0	N/A
Labour	Alan Rew	338	12.4	+6.0
Green	Gillian Maher	198	7.3	−7.5
Liberal Democrats	Nicholas Dennis	168	6.2	−11.4
Majority		385	14.1	−29.5
Turnout		2,719	29.1	−8.4
Conservative hold		Swing		

=== Worthing ===
Broadwater
Party	Candidate	Votes	%	±%
Conservative	Bryan Turner	734	31.2	−7.1
UKIP	Colin Avis	646	27.5	+9.9
Liberal Democrats	Alan Rice	601	25.6	−13.2
Labour	John Turley	369	15.7	+10.2
Majority		88	3.7	
Turnout		2,350	23.7	−9.3
Conservative gain from Liberal Democrats		Swing		

Cissbury
Party	Candidate	Votes	%	±%
Conservative	John Rogers	1,154	41.9	−10.9
UKIP	Robin Harper	1,072	39.0	+14.6
Liberal Democrats	Victoria Taylor	213	7.7	−9.9
Labour	Ann Saunders	170	6.2	+1.0
Green	Al Emery	143	5.2	N/A
Majority		82	2.9	−25.5
Turnout		2,752	32.0	−10.6
Conservative hold		Swing	12.8%	

Durrington & Salvington
Party	Candidate	Votes	%	±%
UKIP	Trixie Hall	946	38.4	+15.2
Conservative	Nicola Waight	906	36.8	−2.7
Liberal Democrats	Michael Donin	351	14.3	−23.0
Labour	Jillian Guest	258	10.5	N/A
Majority		40	1.6	
Turnout		2,461	25.3	−9.1
UKIP gain from Conservative		Swing		

Goring
Party	Candidate	Votes	%	±%
Conservative	Steve Waight	1,079	42.0	−12.0
UKIP	Richard Bater	898	35.0	+14.8
Labour	Janet Haden	225	8.8	+1.0
Liberal Democrats	Neil Campbell	189	7.4	−10.6
Green	David Aherne	176	6.9	N/A
Majority		181	7.0	−26.8
Turnout		2,567	31.3	−8.1
Conservative hold		Swing	-13.4%	

Northbrook
Party	Candidate	Votes	%	±%
Liberal Democrats	Robin Rogers	695	31.5	−26.4
Conservative	Daniel Humphreys	690	31.3	−5.7
UKIP	Mike Jelliss	530	24.1	N/A
Labour	Philip Dufty	211	9.6	+4.5
Green	Melanie Muir	77	3.5	N/A
Majority		5	0.2	−20.7
Turnout		2,203	26.3	−5.3
Liberal Democrats hold		Swing		

Tarring
Party	Candidate	Votes	%	±%
Liberal Democrats	Robert Smytherman	851	33.1	−13.3
UKIP	Shaune King	702	27.3	+9.2
Conservative	Sean M^{c}Donald	593	23.0	−6.0
Labour	Michael Brown	228	8.9	+3.4
Green	William Morris	199	7.7	N/A
Majority		149	5.8	−12.6
Turnout		2,573	26.0	−9.3
Liberal Democrats hold		Swing		

Worthing East
Party	Candidate	Votes	%	±%
Conservative	Roger Oakley	675	30.3	−5.5
UKIP	Grant Lloyd	567	25.5	+10.5
Liberal Democrats	Christine Brown	540	24.3	−16.6
Labour	Mike Barrett	443	19.9	+11.7
Majority		108	4.8	N/A
Turnout		2,225	26.0	−9.2
Conservative gain from Liberal Democrats		Swing		

Worthing Pier
Party	Candidate	Votes	%	±%
Conservative	Michael Cloake	660	29.1	−8.0
Green	James Doyle	514	22.6	N/A
UKIP	Christopher Woodward	475	20.9	+8.1
Liberal Democrats	Hazel Thorpe	340	15.0	−25.1
Labour	Peter Barnes	282	12.4	+5.8
Majority		146	6.5	
Turnout		2,271	24.5	−7.5
Conservative gain from Green		Swing		

Worthing West
Party	Candidate	Votes	%	±%
Conservative	Paul High	917	38.7	−10.2
UKIP	Rick Setford	759	32.1	+12.4
Labour	Alexandra Wagstaff	266	11.2	+3.3
Liberal Democrats	Yvonne Leonard	217	9.2	−14.2
Green	Daniel Aherne	209	8.8	N/A
Majority		158	6.6	−18.9
Turnout		2,368	26.6	−9.7
Conservative gain from UKIP		Swing	-11.3%	
