= Fontwell (electoral division) =

Coordinates: 50.85624°N 0.64201°W

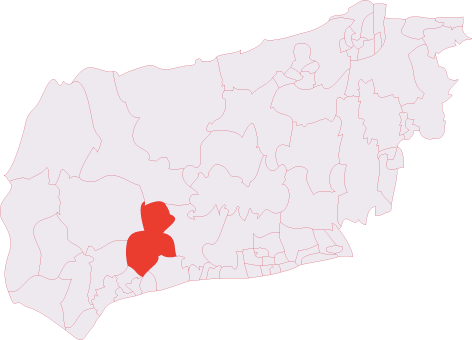
Fontwell
Shown within West Sussex
District:	Arun
UK Parliament Constituency:	Arundel & South Downs
Ceremonial county:	West Sussex
Electorate (2009):	9012
County Councillor
Derek Whittington (Con)

Fontwell is an electoral division of West Sussex in the United Kingdom and returns one member to sit on West Sussex County Council. The current County Councillor, Derek Whittington, is also Cabinet Member for Strategic Planning & Transport.

== Extent ==
The division covers the villages of Aldingbourne, Barnham, Binsted, Eastergate, Fontwell, Madehurst, Slindon, Walberton and Westergate.

It comprises the following Arun District wards: Barnham Ward and Walberton Ward; and of the following civil parishes: Aldingbourne, Barnham, Eastergate, Madehurst, Slindon and Walberton.

== Election results ==
=== 2013 Election ===
Results of the election held on 2 May 2013

Fontwell
Party	Candidate	Votes	%	±%
Conservative	Derek Whittington	1,176	44.3	−20.0
UKIP	Graham Draper	907	34.2	N/A
Liberal Democrats	Stephen White	338	12.7	−23.0
Labour	John Mayes	177	6.7	N/A
BNP	John Robinson	57	2.1	N/A
Majority		269	10.1	−18.5
Turnout		2,655	29.6	−10.3
Conservative hold		Swing		

=== 2009 Election ===
Results of the election held on 4 June 2009:

Fontwell
Party	Candidate	Votes	%	±%
Conservative	Derek Whttington	2,310	64.3	+14.4
Liberal Democrats	Alan Fletcher	1,281	35.7	−1.3
Majority		1,029	28.6	+15.7
Turnout		3,591	39.9	−25.6
Conservative hold		Swing		

=== 2005 Election ===
Results of the election held on 5 May 2005:

Fontwell
Party	Candidate	Votes	%	±%
Conservative	Mr D R Whittington	2,775	49.9	
Liberal Democrats	Mr I S Menzies	2,055	37.0	
UKIP	Mr J Dunning	728	13.1	
Majority		720	12.9	
Turnout		5,558	65.5	
Conservative win (new seat)				
