= East Grinstead Meridian (electoral division) =

Coordinates: 51.13326°N 0.00043°W

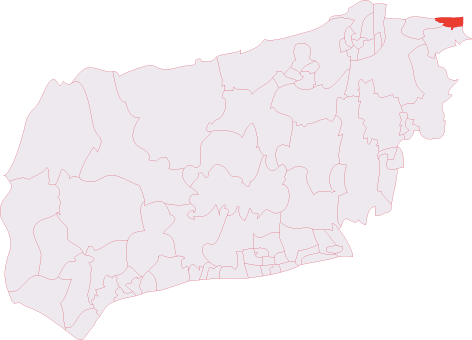
East Grinstead Meridian
Shown within West Sussex
District:	Mid Sussex
UK Parliament Constituency:	Mid Sussex
Ceremonial county:	West Sussex
Electorate (2009):	8323
County Councillor
Liz Bennett (Con)

East Grinstead Meridian is an electoral division of West Sussex in the United Kingdom, and returns one member to sit on West Sussex County Council.

== Extent ==
The division covers the northern part of the town of East Grinstead, and came into existence as the result of a boundary review recommended by the Boundary Committee for England, the results of which were accepted by the Electoral Commission in March 2009.

It comprises the following Mid Sussex District wards: East Grinstead Ashplats Ward, East Grinstead Baldwins Ward and the northern part of East Grinstead Town Ward; and falls entirely within the civil parish of East Grinstead.

== Election results ==
=== 2013 Election ===
Results of the election held on 2 May 2013:

East Grinstead Meridian
Party	Candidate	Votes	%	±%
Conservative	Liz Bennett	1,006	48.0	+0.5
UKIP	Ian Simcock	507	24.2	N/A
Liberal Democrats	Jackie Beckford	307	14.7	−24.2
Labour	Andrew Skudder	163	7.8	+4.3
Green	Catherine Edminson	111	5.3	−4.8
Majority		499	23.8	+15.2
Turnout		2,094	24.9	−10.7
Conservative hold		Swing		

=== 2009 Election ===
Results of the election held on 4 June 2009:

East Grinstead Meridian
Party	Candidate	Votes	%	±%
Conservative	Liz Bennett	1,408	47.5	
Liberal Democrats	Paul Johnson	1,153	38.9	
Green	James Blair	300	10.1	
Labour	Colin Moffatt	103	3.5	
Majority		255	8.6	
Turnout		2,964	35.6	
Conservative win (new seat)				
