= Angmering & Findon (electoral division) =

Coordinates: 50.84226°N 0.45645°W

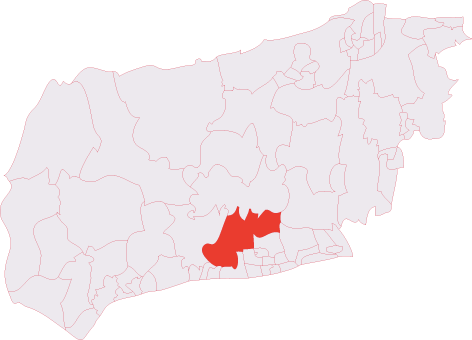
Angmering & Findon
Shown within West Sussex
District:	Arun
UK Parliament Constituency:	Worthing West
Ceremonial county:	West Sussex
Electorate (2021):	9118
County Councillor
Deborah Urquhart (Con)

Angmering & Findon is an electoral division of West Sussex in the United Kingdom and returns one member to sit on West Sussex County Council. The current County Councillor, Deborah Urquhart, is also Cabinet Member for Environment & Economy.

== Extent ==
The division covers the villages of Angmering, Clapham, Findon, Patching and Poling.

It comprises the following Arun District wards: Angmering Ward and Findon Ward; and of the following civil parishes: Angmering, Clapham, Findon, Patching and Poling.

== Election results ==
=== 2021 Election ===
Results of the election held on 6 May 2021:

Angmering & Findon
Party	Candidate	Votes	%	±%
Conservative	Deborah Urquhart	1,596	55.7	−5.8
Liberal Democrats	Louisa Fowles	754	26.3	+8.1
Labour	Alison Baker	310	10.8	−2.7
Green	Chris Medland	207	7.2	N/A
Majority		842	29.4	−13.9
Turnout		2,867	31.7	−2.8
Conservative hold		Swing		

=== 2017 Election ===
Results of the election held on 4 May 2017:

Angmering & Findon
Party	Candidate	Votes	%	±%
Conservative	Deborah Urquhart	1,753	61.5	+17.5
Liberal Democrats	David Bass	514	18.2	+9.0
Labour Co-op	Darren Pearce	384	13.5	+4.4
UKIP	Arthur Lardeur	201	7.1	−30.6
Majority		1,239	43.3	+36.9
Turnout		2,852	34.5	+3.3
Conservative hold		Swing		

=== 2013 Election ===
Results of the election held on 2 May 2013:

Angmering & Findon
Party	Candidate	Votes	%	±%
Conservative	Deborah Urquhart	1,100	44.0	−22.6
UKIP	Tricia Wales	941	37.6	N/A
Liberal Democrats	Jamie Bennett	232	9.2	−24.2
Labour	James Elwood	228	9.1	N/A
Majority		159	6.4	−26.8
Turnout		2,501	31.2	−8.5
Conservative hold		Swing		

=== 2009 Election ===
Results of the election held on 4 June 2009:

Angmering & Findon
Party	Candidate	Votes	%	±%
Conservative	Deborah Urquhart	2,083	66.6	−9.0
Liberal Democrats	Trevor Richards	1,043	33.4	+16.6
Majority		1,040	33.2	−25.6
Turnout		3,126	39.7	+13.9
Conservative hold		Swing		

=== 2006 Bye-election ===
Results of the bye-election held on 1 June 2006:

Angmering & Findon
Party	Candidate	Votes	%	±%
Conservative	Deborah Urquhart	1,500	75.6	+25.4
Liberal Democrats	Trevor Richards	334	16.8	−21.0
Labour	James Field	149	7.5	N/A
Majority		1,166	58.8	+46.4
Turnout		1,983	25.8	−41.0
Conservative hold		Swing		

=== 2005 Election ===
Results of the election held on 5 May 2005:

Angmering & Findon
Party	Candidate	Votes	%	±%
Conservative	Mr O V Wingrove	2,454	50.2	
Liberal Democrats	Mr T J Richards	1,847	37.8	
UKIP	Mr P Russo	588	12.0	
Majority		607	12.4	
Turnout		4,889	66.8	
Conservative win (new seat)				
