= Worthing West =

UK Parliament constituency (since 1997)

Coordinates: 50.84°N 0.44°W

- Borough constituency for the House of Commons
- Boundaries since 2024
- Boundary of Worthing West in South East England
- County: West Sussex
- Electorate: 76,293 (2023)
- Major settlements: Worthing; Salvington; Angmering; Durrington; Goring-by-Sea

Current constituency
- Created: 1997
- Member of Parliament: Beccy Cooper (Labour)
- Created from: Worthing; Shoreham

Worthing West is a constituency (Note: A borough constituency (for the purposes of election expenses and type of returning officer)) represented in the House of Commons of the UK Parliament since 2024 by Beccy Cooper of the Labour Party. She defeated the long serving incumbent Sir Peter Bottomley, a Conservative who was the Father of the House of Commons from 2019. (Note: As with all constituencies, the constituency elects one Member of Parliament (MP) by the first past the post system of election at least every five years.)

== Constituency profile ==
The seat covers the west part of Worthing, Goring and Angmering along the Sussex coast. House prices and incomes are slightly above national averages. Despite being categorised as a "Strong Right" seat by Electoral Calculus, it elected a Labour MP in 2024.

== Boundaries ==
Map of 1997–2024 boundaries

=== 1997–2024 ===
- Worthing wards of: Castle, Central, Durrington, Goring, Heene, Marine, Northbrook, Salvington, and Tarring.
- Arun wards of: East Preston, Ferring, Rustington East and Rustington West.

=== 2024–present ===
Further to the 2023 review of Westminster constituencies which came into effect for the 2024 general election, the constituency is composed of the following (as they existed on 1 December 2020):

- The District of Arun wards of: Angmering & Findon; East Preston; Ferring.
- The Borough of Worthing wards of: Castle; Central; Durrington; Goring; Heene; Marine; Northbrook; Salvington; Tarring.

The constituency was expanded to include the ward of Angmering & Findon, while losing the two Rustington wards to Bognor Regis and Littlehampton.

The constituency covers the central and western two-thirds portion of Worthing, plus the villages of Ferring, East Preston, Angmering and Findon in the district of Arun. The eastern parts of the town are in the East Worthing and Shoreham constituency.

== History ==
The seat was created in 1997 as Worthing and Shoreham were re-divided into Worthing West, and East Worthing and Shoreham.

Before 1945, the area was part of the Horsham and Worthing seat.

The MP from 1997 to 2024 was the Conservative Sir Peter Bottomley. He represented the Woolwich West and related Eltham in south-east London from 1975 to 1997. Labour did not finish second in the seat until 2017 after a substantial increase in their vote, but the seat still had a majority of over 12,000 for the Conservatives, which increased in 2019, but in 2024, Bottomley was defeated by Labour member Beccy Cooper on a large swing.

== Members of Parliament ==
Worthing prior to 1997

Election	Member	Party
1997	Peter Bottomley	Conservative
2024	Beccy Cooper	Labour

== Elections ==
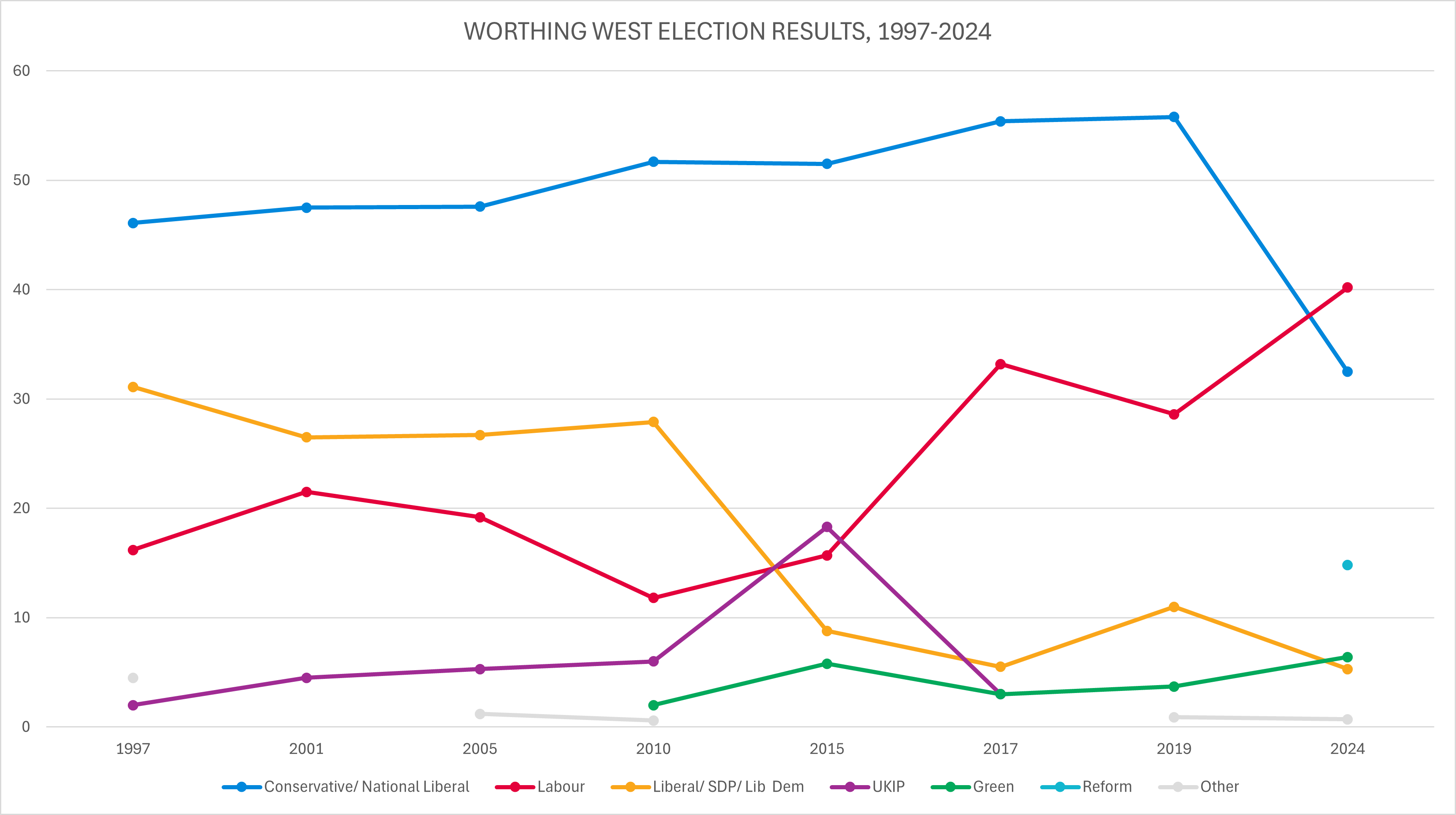
Election results 1997-2024

=== Elections in the 2020s ===
General election 2024: Worthing West
Party	Candidate	Votes	%	±%
Labour	Beccy Cooper	20,519	40.2	▲10.7
Conservative	Peter Bottomley	16,570	32.5	▼23.5
Reform	Edmund Rooke	7,562	14.8	new
Green	Sonya Mallin	3,274	6.4	▲2.8
Liberal Democrats	Morag Chugg	2,708	5.3	▼4.6
Independent	Kathryn Attwood	364	0.7	new
Majority		3,949	7.7	
Turnout		50,997	66.2	▼2.7
Labour gain from Conservative		Swing	▲17.1	

=== Elections in the 2010s ===
General election 2019: Worthing West
Party	Candidate	Votes	%	±%
Conservative	Peter Bottomley	30,475	55.8	+0.4
Labour	Beccy Cooper	15,652	28.6	−4.6
Liberal Democrats	Jamie Bennett	6,024	11.0	+5.5
Green	Joanne Paul	2,008	3.7	+0.7
Independent	David Aherne	489	0.9	N/A
Majority		14,823	27.2	+5.0
Turnout		54,648	69.5	−0.7
Conservative hold		Swing	+2.5	

General election 2017: Worthing West
Party	Candidate	Votes	%	±%
Conservative	Peter Bottomley	30,181	55.4	+3.9
Labour	Beccy Cooper	18,091	33.2	+17.5
Liberal Democrats	Hazel Thorpe	2,982	5.5	−3.3
UKIP	Mark Withers	1,635	3.0	−15.3
Green	Benjamin Cornish	1,614	3.0	−2.8
Majority		12,090	22.2	−11.0
Turnout		54,614	70.2	+3.1
Conservative hold		Swing	-6.8	

General election 2015: Worthing West
Party	Candidate	Votes	%	±%
Conservative	Peter Bottomley	26,124	51.5	−0.2
UKIP	Timothy Cross	9,269	18.3	+12.3
Labour	Jim Deen	7,955	15.7	+3.9
Liberal Democrats	Hazel Thorpe	4,477	8.8	−19.1
Green	David Aherne	2,938	5.8	+3.8
Majority		16,855	33.2	+9.4
Turnout		50,763	67.1	+2.4
Conservative hold		Swing	-6.3	

General election 2010: Worthing West
Party	Candidate	Votes	%	±%
Conservative	Peter Bottomley	25,416	51.7	+4.1
Liberal Democrats	Hazel Thorpe	13,687	27.9	+1.2
Labour	Ian Ross	5,800	11.8	−7.4
UKIP	John Wallace	2,924	6.0	+0.7
Green	David Aherne	996	2.0	N/A
Christian	Stuart Dearsley	300	0.6	N/A
Majority		11,729	23.8	+2.9
Turnout		49,123	64.7	+2.1
Conservative hold		Swing	+1.5	

=== Elections in the 2000s ===
General election 2005: Worthing West
Party	Candidate	Votes	%	±%
Conservative	Peter Bottomley	21,383	47.6	+0.1
Liberal Democrats	Claire Potter	12,004	26.7	+0.2
Labour	Antony Bignell	8,630	19.2	−2.3
UKIP	Timothy Cross	2,374	5.3	+0.8
Legalise Cannabis	Chris Baldwin	515	1.2	N/A
Majority		9,379	20.9	−0.1
Turnout		44,906	62.6	+2.9
Conservative hold		Swing	-0.1	

General election 2001: Worthing West
Party	Candidate	Votes	%	±%
Conservative	Peter Bottomley	20,508	47.5	+1.4
Liberal Democrats	James Walsh	11,471	26.5	−4.6
Labour	Alan Butcher	9,270	21.5	+5.3
UKIP	Timothy Cross	1,960	4.5	+2.5
Majority		9,037	21.0	+6.0
Turnout		43,209	59.7	−12.1
Conservative hold		Swing	+3.0	

=== Elections in the 1990s ===
General election 1997: Worthing West
Party	Candidate	Votes	%	±%
Conservative	Peter Bottomley	23,733	46.1	
Liberal Democrats	Christopher Hare	16,020	31.1	
Labour	John Adams	8,347	16.2	
Referendum	Nick John	2,313	4.5	
UKIP	Timothy Cross	1,029	2.0	
Majority		7,713	15.0	
Turnout		51,442	71.8	
Conservative win (new seat)				

== See also ==
- parliamentary constituencies in West Sussex
- List of parliamentary constituencies in the South East England (region)

== Notes ==
Parliament of the United Kingdom
Preceded by Rushcliffe	Constituency represented by the father of the House; 2019–2024	Succeeded by Gainsborough
