= 2005 West Sussex County Council election =

2005 UK local government election

Results of the 2005 West Sussex County Council election

Elections to West Sussex County Council were held on 5 May 2005. The whole council was up for election and the Conservatives held overall control.

== Election result ==
West Sussex County Council Election Result 2005
| Party | Seats | Gains | Losses | Net gain/loss | Seats % | Votes % | Votes | +/− |
|---|---|---|---|---|---|---|---|---|
| Conservative | 46 | | | +6 | 65.71 | 43.17 | 192,328 | |
| Liberal Democrats | 17 | | | -2 | 24.29 | 32.72 | 145,767 | |
| Labour | 7 | | | -4 | 10.00 | 17.76 | 79,139 | |
| UKIP | 0 | | | | 0.00 | 2.98 | 13,283 | |
| Green | 0 | | | | 0.00 | 2.28 | 10,145 | |
| Independent | 0 | | | -1 | 0.00 | 0.84 | 3,761 | |
| BNP | 0 | | | | 0.00 | 0.20 | 888 | |
| Monster Raving Loony | 0 | | | | 0.00 | 0.04 | 192 | |

== Results by electoral divisions ==
=== Adur ===
Kingston Buci
| Party | Candidate | Votes | % | ±% |
|---|---|---|---|---|
| Conservative | Mr P A Graysmark | 1,674 | 36.9 | |
| Labour Co-op | Mr A P Bray | 1,315 | 29.0 | |
| Liberal Democrats | Mrs J Goldsbrough-Jones | 1,065 | 23.5 | |
| UKIP | Mr M C Henn | 256 | 5.6 | |
| Green | Mr V Tilsley | 227 | 5.0 | |
| Majority | | 359 | 7.9 | |
| Turnout | | 4,537 | 61.9 | |

Lancing
| Party | Candidate | Votes | % | ±% |
|---|---|---|---|---|
| Conservative | Mr C R Albury | 2,201 | 37.4 | |
| Liberal Democrats | Mr R T Burt | 1,799 | 30.6 | |
| Labour | Mr K G Bashford | 1,470 | 25.0 | |
| UKIP | Mr L W Parsons | 413 | 7.0 | |
| Majority | | 731 | 6.8 | |
| Turnout | | 5,883 | 59.5 | |

Saltings
| Party | Candidate | Votes | % | ±% |
|---|---|---|---|---|
| Conservative | Mr R B Dunn | 2,106 | 43.3 | |
| Liberal Democrats | Ms D G Martin | 1,377 | 28.3 | |
| Labour Co-op | Mr D J Yates | 1,155 | 23.7 | |
| UKIP | Mr D M Pledge | 227 | 4.7 | |
| Majority | | 729 | 15.0 | |
| Turnout | | 4,865 | 63.4 | |

Shoreham
| Party | Candidate | Votes | % | ±% |
|---|---|---|---|---|
| Conservative | Mr C R Williams | 2,359 | 47.1 | |
| Liberal Democrats | Mr A C Stuart | 1,055 | 21.1 | |
| Labour Co-op | Mr N R Sweet | 965 | 19.3 | |
| Green | Ms M A Martin | 430 | 8.6 | |
| UKIP | Mr P R Drayton-Morris | 202 | 4.0 | |
| Majority | | 1,304 | 26.0 | |
| Turnout | | 5,011 | 70.0 | |

Sompting
| Party | Candidate | Votes | % | ±% |
|---|---|---|---|---|
| Conservative | Mrs V M Woolhead | 1,635 | 40.0 | |
| Liberal Democrats | Mr S H Martin | 1,230 | 30.1 | |
| Labour | Mr P Berry | 1,226 | 30.0 | |
| Majority | | 405 | 9.9 | |
| Turnout | | 4,091 | 61.1 | |

Southwick
| Party | Candidate | Votes | % | ±% |
|---|---|---|---|---|
| Conservative | Mr K G Eade | 1,966 | 40.1 | |
| Labour Co-op | Ms A Lowe | 1,423 | 29.0 | |
| Liberal Democrats | Mr A J Mortimer | 959 | 19.5 | |
| UKIP | Ms J C Greig | 317 | 6.5 | |
| Green | Ms S E Board | 243 | 5.0 | |
| Majority | | 543 | 11.1 | |
| Turnout | | 4,908 | 64.0 | |

=== Arun ===
Angmering & Findon
| Party | Candidate | Votes | % | ±% |
|---|---|---|---|---|
| Conservative | Mr O V Wingrove | 2,454 | 50.2 | |
| Liberal Democrats | Mr T J Richards | 1,847 | 37.8 | |
| UKIP | Mr P Russo | 588 | 12.0 | |
| Majority | | 607 | 12.4 | |
| Turnout | | 4,889 | 66.8 | |

Arundel & Wick
| Party | Candidate | Votes | % | ±% |
|---|---|---|---|---|
| Conservative | Mr D N Britton | 1,723 | 37.5 | |
| Liberal Democrats | Mr D E Leggatt | 1,254 | 27.3 | |
| Labour | Mr D F Dyball | 1,206 | 26.3 | |
| UKIP | Mr H F Whitaker | 411 | 8.9 | |
| Majority | | 469 | 10.2 | |
| Turnout | | 4,594 | 64.9 | |

Bersted
| Party | Candidate | Votes | % | ±% |
|---|---|---|---|---|
| Liberal Democrats | Mr S E McDougall | 1,684 | 30.4 | |
| Labour | Mr S Holland | 1,661 | 30.0 | |
| Conservative | Mr B W Widger | 1,600 | 28.9 | |
| UKIP | Mr J R W Spencer | 598 | 10.8 | |
| Majority | | 23 | 0.4 | |
| Turnout | | 5,543 | 58.9 | |

Bognor Regis East
| Party | Candidate | Votes | % | ±% |
|---|---|---|---|---|
| Liberal Democrats | Mr F R J Oppler | 1,331 | 32.0 | |
| Labour | Mr M G Jones | 1,228 | 29.5 | |
| Conservative | Mr D M Machonachie | 1,206 | 29.0 | |
| UKIP | Mr A Otton | 398 | 9.6 | |
| Majority | | 103 | 2.5 | |
| Turnout | | 4,163 | 55.2 | |

Bognor Regis West & Aldwick
| Party | Candidate | Votes | % | ±% |
|---|---|---|---|---|
| Conservative | Mr R B Brown | 2,171 | 46.1 | |
| Liberal Democrats | Mr B Dodd | 1,860 | 39.5 | |
| UKIP | Mr I A Fraser | 679 | 14.4 | |
| Majority | | 311 | 6.6 | |
| Turnout | | 4,710 | 61.9 | |

East Preston & Ferring
| Party | Candidate | Votes | % | ±% |
|---|---|---|---|---|
| Conservative | Mr P C Evans | 3,781 | 57.2 | |
| Liberal Democrats | Mr J M Richards | 1,464 | 22.2 | |
| Labour | Mr H E Miller | 1,015 | 15.4 | |
| UKIP | Mr P V Skinner | 348 | 5.3 | |
| Majority | | 2,317 | 35.0 | |
| Turnout | | 6,608 | 69.8 | |

Felpham
| Party | Candidate | Votes | % | ±% |
|---|---|---|---|---|
| Conservative | Mr G G Blampied | 2,371 | 45.2 | |
| Liberal Democrats | Mr M J Harvey | 1,663 | 31.7 | |
| Labour | Mr J B Cosgrove | 727 | 13.9 | |
| UKIP | Mr A J Richardson | 482 | 9.2 | |
| Majority | | 708 | 13.5 | |
| Turnout | | 5,243 | 68.5 | |

Fontwell
| Party | Candidate | Votes | % | ±% |
|---|---|---|---|---|
| Conservative | Mr D R Whittington | 2,775 | 49.9 | |
| Liberal Democrats | Mr I S Menzies | 2,055 | 37.0 | |
| UKIP | Mr J Dunning | 728 | 13.1 | |
| Majority | | 720 | 12.9 | |
| Turnout | | 5,558 | 65.5 | |

Littlehampton East
| Party | Candidate | Votes | % | ±% |
|---|---|---|---|---|
| Liberal Democrats | Dr J M M Walsh | 2,132 | 37.1 | |
| Conservative | Mr G M Tyler | 1,837 | 32.0 | |
| Labour | Mr M J Thomson | 1,246 | 21.7 | |
| UKIP | Mr R H East | 524 | 9.1 | |
| Majority | | 295 | 5.1 | |
| Turnout | | 5,739 | 62.3 | |

Littlehampton Town
| Party | Candidate | Votes | % | ±% |
|---|---|---|---|---|
| Labour | Mr G K O’Neill | 1,399 | 37.1 | |
| Conservative | Mr A W Gammon | 1,016 | 26.9 | |
| Liberal Democrats | Mr D M Jones | 903 | 24.0 | |
| UKIP | Ms M E Lees | 452 | 12.0 | |
| Majority | | 383 | 10.2 | |
| Turnout | | 3,770 | 53.5 | |

Middleton
| Party | Candidate | Votes | % | ±% |
|---|---|---|---|---|
| Conservative | Mrs C A Freeman | 2,528 | 49.0 | |
| Liberal Democrats | Ms R A Kissell | 1,181 | 22.9 | |
| Labour | Mr S B McConnell | 989 | 19.2 | |
| UKIP | Mr A C Sutcliffe | 459 | 8.9 | |
| Majority | | 1,347 | 26.1 | |
| Turnout | | 5,157 | 63.6 | |

Nyetimber
| Party | Candidate | Votes | % | ±% |
|---|---|---|---|---|
| Conservative | Mr M W G Coleman | 3,263 | 47.7 | |
| Labour | Ms P P Nash | 1,468 | 21.5 | |
| Liberal Democrats | Mr G C Burt | 1,450 | 21.2 | |
| UKIP | Mr S D Porter | 649 | 9.5 | |
| Majority | | 1,795 | 26.2 | |
| Turnout | | 6,830 | 68.1 | |

Rustington
| Party | Candidate | Votes | % | ±% |
|---|---|---|---|---|
| Conservative | Mr P T Moor | 2,817 | 46.1 | |
| Liberal Democrats | Mr A S D Lauretani | 1,971 | 32.3 | |
| Labour | Mr A J Dines | 904 | 14.8 | |
| UKIP | Ms J A Penn | 413 | 6.8 | |
| Majority | | 846 | 13.8 | |
| Turnout | | 6,105 | 68.0 | |

=== Chichester ===
Bourne
| Party | Candidate | Votes | % | ±% |
|---|---|---|---|---|
| Conservative | Mr T M E Dunn | 2,377 | 40.5 | |
| Liberal Democrats | Mr R A Gowlett | 1,922 | 32.8 | |
| Labour | Mr J Baker | 841 | 14.3 | |
| Independent | Mrs C H Phillips | 375 | 6.4 | |
| UKIP | Mrs A R Denny | 347 | 5.9 | |
| Majority | | 455 | 7.7 | |
| Turnout | | 5,862 | 65.6 | |

Chichester East
| Party | Candidate | Votes | % | ±% |
|---|---|---|---|---|
| Liberal Democrats | Mr A R H Smith | 2,191 | 40.8 | |
| Conservative | Mr S I King | 1,765 | 32.9 | |
| Labour | Mr B Earnshaw-Mansell | 1,047 | 19.5 | |
| UKIP | Mr A S Preater-Cole | 368 | 6.9 | |
| Majority | | 426 | 7.9 | |
| Turnout | | 5,371 | 59.2 | |

Chichester North
| Party | Candidate | Votes | % | ±% |
|---|---|---|---|---|
| Liberal Democrats | Mr M N Hall | 2,628 | 48.7 | |
| Conservative | Mrs H A Flynn | 1,884 | 34.9 | |
| Labour | Mr D Morrison | 593 | 11.0 | |
| UKIP | Mr M A H Mason | 290 | 5.4 | |
| Majority | | 744 | 13.8 | |
| Turnout | | 5,395 | 68.4 | |

Chichester South
| Party | Candidate | Votes | % | ±% |
|---|---|---|---|---|
| Liberal Democrats | Mr A D Chaplin | 2,244 | 40.5 | |
| Conservative | Mr A P Dignum | 2,034 | 36.7 | |
| Labour | Mr M J Few | 891 | 16.1 | |
| UKIP | Mr N D W Sitwell | 374 | 6.7 | |
| Majority | | 210 | 3.8 | |
| Turnout | | 5,543 | 65.3 | |

Chichester West
| Party | Candidate | Votes | % | ±% |
|---|---|---|---|---|
| Conservative | Ms M L Goldsmith | 2,446 | 39.4 | |
| Liberal Democrats | Mr J R Campling | 2,051 | 33.0 | |
| Labour | Mr R J Hastings | 875 | 14.1 | |
| UKIP | Mr J McCulloch | 367 | 5.9 | |
| Independent | Mr A J Phillips | 268 | 4.3 | |
| Independent | Mr R I Apel | 202 | 3.3 | |
| Majority | | 395 | 6.4 | |
| Turnout | | 6,209 | 68.9 | |

Fernhurst
| Party | Candidate | Votes | % | ±% |
|---|---|---|---|---|
| Conservative | Lt Con T Pemberton | 3,022 | 52.3 | |
| Liberal Democrats | Mr K V Rowsell | 1,848 | 32.0 | |
| Labour | Mr B R D Hollowood | 616 | 10.7 | |
| UKIP | Mr D E Denny | 295 | 5.1 | |
| Majority | | 1,174 | 20.3 | |
| Turnout | | 5,781 | 70.5 | |

Midhurst
| Party | Candidate | Votes | % | ±% |
|---|---|---|---|---|
| Conservative | Ms N J Hendon | 2,222 | 38.5 | |
| Independent | Mr A M Shaxson | 1,653 | 28.7 | |
| Liberal Democrats | Ms J R Fowler | 1,612 | 28.0 | |
| UKIP | Mr P J Cole | 280 | 4.9 | |
| Majority | | 569 | 9.8 | |
| Turnout | | 5,767 | 68.1 | |

Petworth
| Party | Candidate | Votes | % | ±% |
|---|---|---|---|---|
| Conservative | Mr P W J Moffatt | 3,524 | 54.2 | |
| Liberal Democrats | Mr R Cooper | 1,968 | 30.3 | |
| Labour | Ms J Miller | 651 | 10.0 | |
| UKIP | Ms V A Moran | 354 | 5.4 | |
| Majority | | 1,556 | 23.9 | |
| Turnout | | 6,497 | 69.7 | |

Selsey
| Party | Candidate | Votes | % | ±% |
|---|---|---|---|---|
| Conservative | Mr P E Jones | 2,155 | 40.2 | |
| Liberal Democrats | Mr J E Shade | 1,386 | 25.9 | |
| Labour | Ms M M Lawson | 1,214 | 22.6 | |
| UKIP | Mr B A Smith | 605 | 11.3 | |
| Majority | | 769 | 14.3 | |
| Turnout | | 5,360 | 64.6 | |

The Witterings
| Party | Candidate | Votes | % | ±% |
|---|---|---|---|---|
| Conservative | Mr J M Daws-Chew | 2,339 | 45.3 | |
| Liberal Democrats | Mr A G Wells | 993 | 19.2 | |
| Independent | Mr R J Norris | 755 | 14.6 | |
| Labour | Mr P J O’Sullivan | 632 | 12.2 | |
| UKIP | Mr R L Wilson | 450 | 8.7 | |
| Majority | | 1,346 | 26.1 | |
| Turnout | | 5,169 | 66.3 | |

=== Crawley ===
Bewbush, Gossops Green & Southgate (2)
| Party | Candidate | Votes | % | ±% |
|---|---|---|---|---|
| Labour | Mr C J Mullins | 3,674 | 23.8 | |
| Labour | Mrs J C Sully | 2,856 | 18.5 | |
| Conservative | Mr B K Blake | 2,763 | 17.9 | |
| Conservative | Mr H S Bloom | 2,707 | 17.6 | |
| Liberal Democrats | Mr J C Bonner | 1,526 | 9.9 | |
| Liberal Democrats | Mr D C Wise | 1,142 | 7.4 | |
| Green | Rev M D Liles | 747 | 4.8 | |
| Turnout | | 15,415 | 54.8 | |

Broadfield
| Party | Candidate | Votes | % | ±% |
|---|---|---|---|---|
| Labour | Mr J McGough | 1,861 | 45.5 | |
| Conservative | Mr M T Head | 1,291 | 31.6 | |
| Liberal Democrats | Mr M R Scott | 723 | 17.7 | |
| UKIP | Mr D A Hardman | 212 | 5.2 | |
| Majority | | 570 | 13.9 | |
| Turnout | | 4,087 | 49.2 | |

Ifield, Langley Green & West Green (2)
| Party | Candidate | Votes | % | ±% |
|---|---|---|---|---|
| Labour | Mr J Mortimer | 3,906 | 25.5 | |
| Labour | Mr J G T Smith | 3,173 | 20.7 | |
| Conservative | Mr J I Denman | 2,295 | 15.0 | |
| Conservative | Mr C J Skinner | 2,075 | 13.6 | |
| Liberal Democrats | Mr B J Hamilton | 1,411 | 9.2 | |
| Liberal Democrats | Mr K J R Osborne | 1,175 | 7.7 | |
| BNP | Mr G W Baldwin | 673 | 4.4 | |
| Green | Mr A S D Graham | 586 | 3.8 | |
| Turnout | | 15,294 | 55.7 | |

Northgate & Three Bridges
| Party | Candidate | Votes | % | ±% |
|---|---|---|---|---|
| Labour | Ms G D Joyce | 1,719 | 36.8 | |
| Conservative | Ms B J Burgess | 1,546 | 33.1 | |
| Liberal Democrats | Mr D J Barry | 1,049 | 22.5 | |
| BNP | Mr R N Grice | 215 | 4.6 | |
| Green | Mrs M F Liles | 143 | 3.1 | |
| Majority | | 173 | 3.7 | |
| Turnout | | 4,672 | 60.1 | |

Pound Hill, Worth & Maidenbower (2)
| Party | Candidate | Votes | % | ±% |
|---|---|---|---|---|
| Conservative | Mr H E M Smith | 5,532 | 29.1 | |
| Conservative | Mr D G Dewdney | 4,804 | 25.3 | |
| Labour | Ms J Skudder | 2,307 | 12.1 | |
| Labour | Mr E M Sully | 2,218 | 11.7 | |
| Liberal Democrats | Mr E Reay | 1,853 | 9.7 | |
| Liberal Democrats | Mr P S Bannister | 1,528 | 8.0 | |
| Green | Mr B T A Liles | 782 | 4.1 | |
| Turnout | | 19,024 | 63.4 | |

Tilgate & Furnace Green
| Party | Candidate | Votes | % | ±% |
|---|---|---|---|---|
| Conservative | Mr D G Crow | 2,302 | 40.6 | |
| Labour | Mr W A Ward | 2,127 | 37.5 | |
| Liberal Democrats | Mr R J McMurray | 963 | 17.0 | |
| Green | Ms V Dore | 283 | 5.0 | |
| Majority | | 175 | 3.1 | |
| Turnout | | 5,675 | 63.5 | |

=== Horsham ===
Billingshurst
| Party | Candidate | Votes | % | ±% |
|---|---|---|---|---|
| Conservative | Mr O J Davies | 2,950 | 50.6 | |
| Liberal Democrats | Mr G F H Lawes | 2,078 | 35.7 | |
| Labour | Ms S Morton | 797 | 13.7 | |
| Majority | | 872 | 14.9 | |
| Turnout | | 5,825 | 66.5 | |

Bramber Castle
| Party | Candidate | Votes | % | ±% |
|---|---|---|---|---|
| Liberal Democrats | Mr D R Deedman | 3,056 | 48.8 | |
| Conservative | Mr A N Whall | 2,473 | 39.5 | |
| Labour | Mr P Hilditch | 737 | 11.8 | |
| Majority | | 583 | 9.3 | |
| Turnout | | 6,266 | 70.4 | |

Henfield
| Party | Candidate | Votes | % | ±% |
|---|---|---|---|---|
| Conservative | Mr L H Barnard | 3,381 | 61.8 | |
| Liberal Democrats | Mr F W S Taylor | 2,086 | 38.2 | |
| Majority | | 1,295 | 23.6 | |
| Turnout | | 5,467 | 67.7 | |

Holbrook
| Party | Candidate | Votes | % | ±% |
|---|---|---|---|---|
| Conservative | Mr P C Catchpole | 2,546 | 44.4 | |
| Liberal Democrats | Mr L J C Crosbie | 2,374 | 41.4 | |
| Labour | Mr R E Chapman | 815 | 14.2 | |
| Majority | | 172 | 3.0 | |
| Turnout | | 5,734 | 68.7 | |

Horsham Carfax
| Party | Candidate | Votes | % | ±% |
|---|---|---|---|---|
| Liberal Democrats | Dr N P S Dennis | 3,018 | 51.6 | |
| Conservative | Ms E A Ostacchini | 2,013 | 34.4 | |
| Labour | Ms K J Goddard | 815 | 13.9 | |
| Majority | | 1,005 | 17.2 | |
| Turnout | | 5,846 | 67.9 | |

Horsham Riverside
| Party | Candidate | Votes | % | ±% |
|---|---|---|---|---|
| Liberal Democrats | Mrs M E Millson | 3,015 | 52.0 | |
| Conservative | Mr N R M Lowson | 1,915 | 33.0 | |
| Labour | Mr J D Thomas | 873 | 15.0 | |
| Majority | | 1,100 | 19.0 | |
| Turnout | | 5,803 | 67.3 | |

Pulborough
| Party | Candidate | Votes | % | ±% |
|---|---|---|---|---|
| Conservative | Mrs P A C Arculus | 3,826 | 63.7 | |
| Liberal Democrats | Mr D B C Wright | 2,177 | 36.3 | |
| Majority | | 1,649 | 27.4 | |
| Turnout | | 6,003 | 68.2 | |

Roffey
| Party | Candidate | Votes | % | ±% |
|---|---|---|---|---|
| Liberal Democrats | Mr W J Hellawell | 2,751 | 45.5 | |
| Conservative | Mr J W Charles | 2,347 | 38.8 | |
| Labour | Mr R M Wilson | 946 | 15.7 | |
| Majority | | 404 | 6.7 | |
| Turnout | | 6,044 | 64.3 | |

Southwater & Nuthurst
| Party | Candidate | Votes | % | ±% |
|---|---|---|---|---|
| Conservative | Mr B R A D Watson | 3,057 | 48.4 | |
| Liberal Democrats | Mr P J Stainton | 2,608 | 41.3 | |
| Labour | Mr T C Parker | 646 | 10.2 | |
| Majority | | 449 | 7.1 | |
| Turnout | | 6,311 | 69.0 | |

Storrington
| Party | Candidate | Votes | % | ±% |
|---|---|---|---|---|
| Conservative | Mr F T Wilkinson | 3,767 | 58.8 | |
| Liberal Democrats | Mr A G Hughes | 1,619 | 25.3 | |
| Labour | Ms P J Banks | 1,020 | 15.9 | |
| Majority | | 2,148 | 33.5 | |
| Turnout | | 6,406 | 70.1 | |

Warnham & Rusper
| Party | Candidate | Votes | % | ±% |
|---|---|---|---|---|
| Conservative | Mr M P S Hodgson | 3,217 | 56.5 | |
| Liberal Democrats | Mr T H Pearce | 1,645 | 28.9 | |
| Labour | Ms J A Battersby | 832 | 14.6 | |
| Majority | | 1,572 | 27.6 | |
| Turnout | | 5,694 | 67.3 | |

=== Mid Sussex ===
Burgess Hill (2)
| Party | Candidate | Votes | % | ±% |
|---|---|---|---|---|
| Liberal Democrats | Mrs S Knight | 4,940 | 22.4 | |
| Conservative | Mr A J Barrett-Miles | 4,677 | 21.2 | |
| Liberal Democrats | Mrs J M Henwood | 4,627 | 20.9 | |
| Conservative | Mrs J A Landriani | 4,445 | 20.1 | |
| Labour | Mr I Renshaw | 1,495 | 6.8 | |
| Labour | Mr A L West | 977 | 4.4 | |
| Green | Mrs M J McGregor | 930 | 4.2 | |
| Turnout | | 22,091 | 67.9 | |

Cuckfield & Lucastes
| Party | Candidate | Votes | % | ±% |
|---|---|---|---|---|
| Conservative | Mrs A M Morris | 2,633 | 53.0 | |
| Liberal Democrats | Mrs I Balls | 1,556 | 31.3 | |
| Labour | Mr D W Davies | 423 | 8.5 | |
| Green | Mr P B Wemyss-Gorman | 354 | 7.1 | |
| Majority | | 1,077 | 21.7 | |
| Turnout | | 4,966 | 72.8 | |

East Grinstead (2)
| Party | Candidate | Votes | % | ±% |
|---|---|---|---|---|
| Liberal Democrats | Mrs M E Collins | 4,802 | 23.8 | |
| Conservative | Mrs M M Ball | 4,680 | 23.2 | |
| Conservative | Mr A G Bass | 4,449 | 22.0 | |
| Liberal Democrats | Mr A N Brock | 4,138 | 20.5 | |
| Labour | Mr S D Fallowell | 1,257 | 6.2 | |
| Labour | Mr D A Irvine | 875 | 4.3 | |
| Turnout | | 20,201 | 66.6 | |

Hassocks & Victoria
| Party | Candidate | Votes | % | ±% |
|---|---|---|---|---|
| Liberal Democrats | Dr C E Wilsdon | 2,818 | 42.9 | |
| Conservative | Mr S K J Bell | 2,632 | 40.1 | |
| Labour | Mrs A P Piercy | 697 | 10.6 | |
| Green | Mr D M Hammond | 423 | 6.4 | |
| Majority | | 186 | 2.8 | |
| Turnout | | 6,570 | 69.9 | |

Haywards Heath East
| Party | Candidate | Votes | % | ±% |
|---|---|---|---|---|
| Conservative | Mr A J De-Mierre | 1,779 | 36.3 | |
| Liberal Democrats | Ms J Brown | 1,615 | 33.0 | |
| Labour | Mr P J Henry | 1,504 | 30.7 | |
| Majority | | 164 | 3.3 | |
| Turnout | | 4,898 | 67.6 | |

Haywards Heath Town
| Party | Candidate | Votes | % | ±% |
|---|---|---|---|---|
| Liberal Democrats | Mr B Hall | 2,096 | 39.4 | |
| Conservative | Mrs M N Baker | 2,052 | 38.6 | |
| Labour | Mr R Goddard | 846 | 15.9 | |
| Green | Mr P P Smith | 324 | 6.1 | |
| Majority | | 44 | 0.8 | |
| Turnout | | 5,318 | 70.0 | |

Hurstpierpoint & Bolney
| Party | Candidate | Votes | % | ±% |
|---|---|---|---|---|
| Conservative | Mr P A D Griffiths | 2,816 | 53.8 | |
| Liberal Democrats | Mr N C S Cook | 1,479 | 28.3 | |
| Labour | Mr M P Uhlhorn | 745 | 14.2 | |
| Monster Raving Loony | Mr P B Berry | 192 | 3.7 | |
| Majority | | 1,337 | 25.5 | |
| Turnout | | 5,232 | 70.7 | |

Imberdown
| Party | Candidate | Votes | % | ±% |
|---|---|---|---|---|
| Conservative | Mr P A C Coote | 2,533 | 48.5 | |
| Liberal Democrats | Mr E A Matthews | 1,312 | 25.1 | |
| Green | Ms C W Edminson | 805 | 15.4 | |
| Labour | Mr M Briggs | 578 | 11.1 | |
| Majority | | 1,221 | 23.4 | |
| Turnout | | 5,228 | 71.9 | |

Lindfield & High Weald
| Party | Candidate | Votes | % | ±% |
|---|---|---|---|---|
| Conservative | Mrs M D Johnson | 3,586 | 52.0 | |
| Liberal Democrats | Ms A Lucraft | 2,045 | 29.7 | |
| Green | Mr P E M Brown | 646 | 9.4 | |
| Labour | Mr J M Crawford | 613 | 8.9 | |
| Majority | | 1,514 | 22.3 | |
| Turnout | | 6,890 | 73.5 | |

Worth Forest
| Party | Candidate | Votes | % | ±% |
|---|---|---|---|---|
| Conservative | Mr W E Acraman | 3,208 | 53.4 | |
| Liberal Democrats | Mr G E Knight | 1,327 | 22.1 | |
| Labour | Mr R M Burgess | 1,025 | 17.0 | |
| Green | Mr M B Weller | 452 | 7.5 | |
| Majority | | 1,881 | 31.3 | |
| Turnout | | 6,012 | 68.5 | |

=== Worthing ===
Gaisford (2)
| Party | Candidate | Votes | % | ±% |
|---|---|---|---|---|
| Liberal Democrats | Mr P E Green | 5,012 | 24.0 | |
| Liberal Democrats | Mr D R M Lissenburg | 4,238 | 20.3 | |
| Conservative | Mrs M F Lermitte | 3,452 | 16.5 | |
| Conservative | Mr J L Rogers | 3,413 | 16.4 | |
| Labour | Mr J S Gardiner | 1,736 | 8.3 | |
| Labour | Mr J M Turley | 1,465 | 7.0 | |
| Green | Ms M Hillcoat | 1,117 | 5.4 | |
| Independent | Mr I D Sandell | 426 | 2.0 | |
| Turnout | | 20,859 | 58.4 | |

Goring & Northbrook (2)
| Party | Candidate | Votes | % | ±% |
|---|---|---|---|---|
| Conservative | Mr K C R Mercer | 4,024 | 21.5 | |
| Conservative | Mr S G Waight | 3,766 | 20.2 | |
| Liberal Democrats | Mr N C Rodgers | 3,279 | 17.6 | |
| Liberal Democrats | Mr R T Rogers | 3,078 | 16.5 | |
| Labour | Mr A Bignell | 1,384 | 7.4 | |
| Labour | Mr N T Duffy | 1,302 | 7.0 | |
| Green | Mr A M Stace | 698 | 3.7 | |
| UKIP | Mr R G Bater | 628 | 3.4 | |
| UKIP | Mr C M Woodward | 515 | 2.8 | |
| Turnout | | 18,674 | 61.0 | |

Salvington (2)
| Party | Candidate | Votes | % | ±% |
|---|---|---|---|---|
| Conservative | Mr C A O’Neill | 5,265 | 28.1 | |
| Conservative | Mr C H Stevens | 5,061 | 27.0 | |
| Liberal Democrats | Mr M D Donin | 3,404 | 18.2 | |
| Liberal Democrats | Mr K D R Sunderland | 3,191 | 17.0 | |
| Labour | Ms H Rennie | 1,797 | 9.6 | |
| Turnout | | 18,718 | 62.7 | |

Worthing East
| Party | Candidate | Votes | % | ±% |
|---|---|---|---|---|
| Liberal Democrats | Mrs I C Richards | 1,866 | 41.9 | |
| Conservative | Mr M Saheid | 1,764 | 39.6 | |
| Labour | Ms A Saunders | 828 | 18.6 | |
| Majority | | 102 | 2.3 | |
| Turnout | | 4,458 | 57.5 | |

Worthing Pier
| Party | Candidate | Votes | % | ±% |
|---|---|---|---|---|
| Conservative | Mr C B Roberts | 1,678 | 40.4 | |
| Liberal Democrats | Ms C B Brown | 1,434 | 34.5 | |
| Labour | Mr P H Barnes | 694 | 16.7 | |
| Green | Mr D H Colkett | 351 | 8.4 | |
| Majority | | 244 | 5.9 | |
| Turnout | | 4,157 | 52.5 | |

Worthing West
| Party | Candidate | Votes | % | ±% |
|---|---|---|---|---|
| Conservative | Mr J Livermore | 2,357 | 45.22 | |
| Liberal Democrats | Mr A S Rice | 1,295 | 24.8 | |
| Labour | Mr B F Slater | 820 | 15.7 | |
| Green | Mrs L Colkett | 392 | 7.5 | |
| UKIP | Mr P A Ruddock | 266 | 5.1 | |
| Independent | Mr J D Robers | 82 | 1.6 | |
| Majority | | 1,062 | 20.4 | |
| Turnout | | 5,212 | 60.5 | |
