= Bognor Regis and Littlehampton =

UK Parliament constituency (since 1997)

Coordinates: 50.8°N 0.6°W

- County constituency for the House of Commons
- Boundaries since 2024
- Boundary of Bognor Regis and Littlehampton in South East England
- County: West Sussex
- Population: 98,433 (2011 census)
- Electorate: 76,985 (2023)
- Major settlements: Bognor Regis, Felpham and Littlehampton

Current constituency
- Created: 1997
- Member of Parliament: Alison Griffiths (Conservative)
- Seats: One
- Created from: Arundel

Bognor Regis and Littlehampton (/ˈbɒɡnər riːdʒɪs-/) is a constituency (Note: A county constituency (for the purposes of election expenses and type of returning officer)) in West Sussex represented in the House of Commons of the UK Parliament since 2024 by Alison Griffiths, a Conservative. (Note: As with all constituencies, the constituency elects one Member of Parliament (MP) by the first past the post system of election at least every five years.)

== Constituency profile ==
The constituency is located on the south coast of England, within the Arun district of the county of West Sussex. It stretches from Aldwick in the west to Rustington in the east and contains the large seaside resort town of Bognor Regis, the smaller town of Littlehampton and the village of Yapton. Bognor Regis was traditionally a small fishing village which grew rapidly in the late 19th century as a coastal tourist town.

Compared to national averages, residents of the constituency are older, more deprived and have lower levels of education and professional employment. The proportion of social housing is lower than the UK average, and White people make up 95% of the population. Local politics are mixed; at the most recent district council election in 2023, voters in Bognor Regis elected primarily Conservative or Liberal Democrat councillors, whilst the Labour Party won most of the seats in Littlehampton. In the 2016 referendum on European Union membership, voters in the constituency strongly supported Brexit with an estimated 65% voting in favour.

== Boundaries ==
Map of boundaries 2010–2024

The constituency is elongated along the south coast of England. It includes the towns of Bognor Regis and Littlehampton.

1997–2010: The District of Arun wards of Aldwick East, Aldwick West, Bersted, Felpham East, Felpham West, Hotham, Littlehampton Beach, Littlehampton Central, Littlehampton Ham, Littlehampton River, Littlehampton Wick, Marine, Middleton on Sea, Orchard, Pagham, and Pevensey.

2010–2024: The District of Arun wards of Aldwick East, Aldwick West, Beach, Bersted, Brookfield, Felpham East, Felpham West, Ham, Hotham, Marine, Middleton-on-Sea, Orchard, Pagham and Rose Green, Pevensey, River, Wick with Toddington, and Yapton.

2024–present: The District of Arun wards of: Aldwick East; Aldwick West; Beach; Brookfield; Courtwick with Toddington; Felpham East (most); Felpham West; Hotham; Marine; Middleton-on-Sea; Orchard; Pevensey; River; Rustington East; Rustington West; Yapton.

The electorate was reduced to bring it within the permitted range by transferring Bersted and Pagham to Chichester. To partly compensate, Rustington was added from Worthing West.

== History ==
=== Political history ===
The vote share and majority for the Conservative MP, Nick Gibb, who won the first six general elections in this seat, grew since 2001 to reach over 22,000 votes.

At the first three general elections, the Labour Party candidate was runner-up, notably denting Gibb's winning margin to 5,632 votes in 2001. In 2010, the Liberal Democrat candidate took second place, more than 4,000 votes ahead of Labour and 13,063 short of Gibb's total. Mirroring nationwide performance, the Lib Dem vote share fell in 2015, whilst the UKIP vote share rose in this constituency, becoming the runner-up, but 13,944 votes short of Gibb's tally.

In June 2016, an estimated 64.8% of local adults voting in the EU membership referendum voted to Leave the European Union. This was matched in two January 2018 votes in Parliament by MP Nick Gibb.

In 2017, Labour's candidate of 2015 was reselected to stand and took second place.

The year 2017 saw an independent candidate, Paul Sanderson, the chaplain of The Littlehampton Academy come within 1% of retaining his political deposit and ahead of the UKIP and Green candidates.

Gibb was re-elected for a seventh time in 2019, with an increased majority of 22,503 votes and a vote share of 63.5%. He did not stand at the 2024 general election and his successor as the Conservative candidate, Alison Griffiths, was elected with a drastically reduced majority of 1,765, having suffered an adverse swing of 19.8%.

=== Contents and regional context ===
The seat was created from the western, more populous part of the Arundel seat on its 1997 abolition. Before the latter's creation in 1974, Bognor Regis was part of the Chichester seat and Littlehampton part of the Arundel and Shoreham seat.

=== Notable representatives ===
From its creation in 1997 until 2024, the seat was represented by Nick Gibb of the Conservative Party. Gibb had worked for the party for over ten years, and became an MP at his third attempt. After thirteen years in opposition, he joined David Cameron's coalition government after the 2010 general election, becoming Minister of State for School Standards, working under Education Secretary Michael Gove. He left the government in a 2012 reshuffle, being replaced by David Laws. He then returned to the same department, now run by Nicky Morgan, as Parliamentary Under-Secretary of State for Childcare, Education and School Reform in 2014. The following year, he again took up his previous post, which he then held under three Prime Ministers (Cameron, Theresa May and Boris Johnson) and five Education Secretaries (Gove, Morgan, Justine Greening, Damian Hinds and Gavin Williamson). He was dismissed from this position in 2021.

== Members of Parliament ==
Arundel prior to 1997

Election	Member	Party
1997	Nick Gibb	Conservative
2024	Alison Griffiths	Conservative

== Elections ==
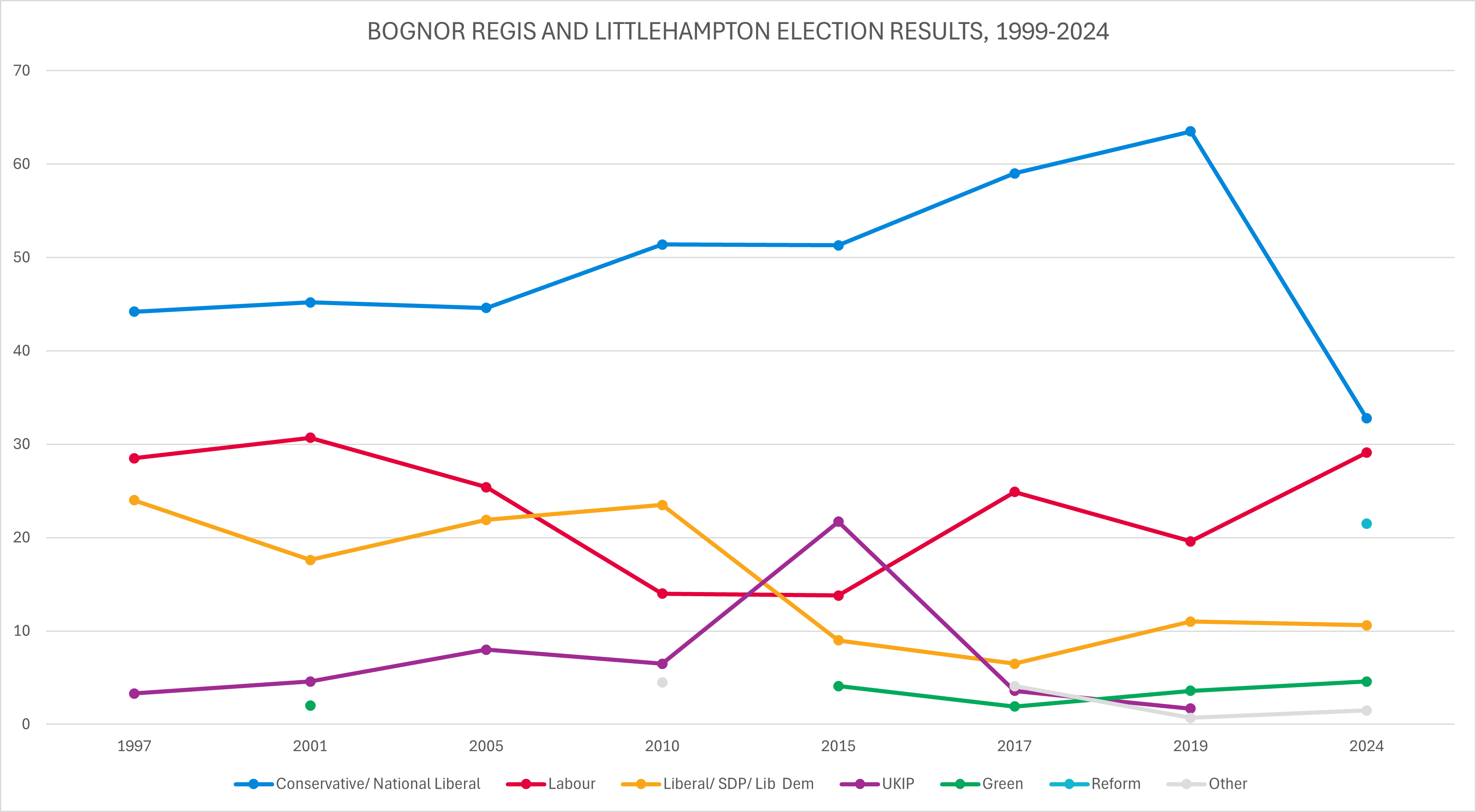
Election results 1950-2024

=== Elections in the 2020s ===
General election 2024: Bognor Regis and Littlehampton
Party	Candidate	Votes	%	±%
Conservative	Alison Griffiths	15,678	32.8	−29.4
Labour	Clare Walsh	13,913	29.1	+10.1
Reform	Sandra Daniells	10,262	21.5	New
Liberal Democrats	Henry Jones	5,081	10.6	−2.7
Green	Carol Birch	2,185	4.6	+1.3
Heritage	David Kurten	708	1.5	New
Majority		1,765	3.7	−39.5
Turnout		47,827	61.7	−6.5
Registered electors		77,565		
Conservative hold		Swing	−19.8	

=== Elections in the 2010s ===
2019 notional result
Party	Vote	%
Conservative	32,645	62.2
Labour	9,963	19.0
Liberal Democrats	6,978	13.3
Green	1,711	3.3
Others	1,213	2.3
Turnout	52,510	68.2
Electorate	76,985	

General election 2019: Bognor Regis and Littlehampton
Party	Candidate	Votes	%	±%
Conservative	Nick Gibb	32,521	63.5	+4.5
Labour	Alan Butcher	10,018	19.6	−5.3
Liberal Democrats	Francis Oppler	5,645	11.0	+4.5
Green	Carol Birch	1,826	3.6	+1.7
UKIP	David Kurten	846	1.7	−1.9
Independent	Andrew Elston	367	0.7	New
Majority		22,503	43.9	+9.8
Turnout		51,223	66.1	−1.6
Conservative hold		Swing	+4.9	

General election 2017: Bognor Regis and Littlehampton
Party	Candidate	Votes	%	±%
Conservative	Nick Gibb	30,276	59.0	+7.7
Labour	Alan Butcher	12,782	24.9	+11.1
Liberal Democrats	Francis Oppler	3,352	6.5	−2.5
Independent	Paul Sanderson	2,088	4.1	New
UKIP	Patrick Lowe	1,861	3.6	−18.1
Green	Andrew Bishop	993	1.9	−2.2
Majority		17,494	34.1	+4.5
Turnout		51,352	67.7	+3.2
Conservative hold		Swing	−1.75	

General election 2015: Bognor Regis and Littlehampton
Party	Candidate	Votes	%	±%
Conservative	Nick Gibb	24,185	51.3	−0.1
UKIP	Graham Jones	10,241	21.7	+15.2
Labour	Alan Butcher	6,508	13.8	−0.2
Liberal Democrats	Francis Oppler	4,240	9.0	−14.5
Green	Simon McDougall	1,942	4.1	New
Majority		13,944	29.6	+1.7
Turnout		47,116	64.5	−1.7
Conservative hold		Swing		

General election 2010: Bognor Regis and Littlehampton
Party	Candidate	Votes	%	±%
Conservative	Nick Gibb	24,087	51.4	+6.8
Liberal Democrats	Simon McDougall	11,024	23.5	+1.6
Labour	Michael Jones	6,580	14.0	−11.4
UKIP	Douglas Denny	3,036	6.5	−1.5
BNP	Andrew Moffat	1,890	4.0	New
Independent	Melissa Briggs	235	0.5	New
Majority		13,063	27.9	+8.7
Turnout		46,852	66.2	+3.1
Conservative hold		Swing		

=== Elections in the 2000s ===
General election 2005: Bognor Regis and Littlehampton
Party	Candidate	Votes	%	±%
Conservative	Nick Gibb	18,183	44.6	−0.6
Labour	George O'Neill	10,361	25.4	−5.3
Liberal Democrats	Simon McDougall	8,927	21.9	+4.3
UKIP	Adrian Lithgow	3,276	8.0	+3.4
Majority		7,822	19.2	+4.7
Turnout		40,747	62.1	+3.9
Conservative hold		Swing	+2.3	

General election 2001: Bognor Regis and Littlehampton
Party	Candidate	Votes	%	±%
Conservative	Nick Gibb	17,602	45.2	+1.0
Labour	George O’Neill	11,959	30.7	+2.2
Liberal Democrats	Pamela Peskett	6,846	17.6	−6.4
UKIP	George Stride	1,779	4.6	+1.3
Green	Lilius Cheyne	782	2.0	New
Majority		5,643	14.5	−1.2
Turnout		38,968	58.2	−11.4
Conservative hold		Swing	−0.6	

=== Elections in the 1990s ===
General election 1997: Bognor Regis and Littlehampton
Party	Candidate	Votes	%	±%
Conservative	Nick Gibb	20,537	44.2	−12.6
Labour	Roger A. Nash	13,216	28.5	+15.0
Liberal Democrats	James M.M. Walsh	11,153	24.0	−2.7
UKIP	George Stride	1,537	3.3	New
Majority		7,321	15.7	
Turnout		46,443	69.6	
Conservative hold		Swing	−13.8	

== See also ==
- List of parliamentary constituencies in West Sussex
- List of parliamentary constituencies in the South East England (region)

== Sources ==
- Election result, 2005 (BBC)
- Election results, 1997 - 2001 (BBC)
- Election results, 1997 - 2001 (Election Demon)
- Election results, 1997 - 2005 (Guardian)
