= Horsham Riverside (electoral division) =

Coordinates: 51.05995°N 0.30384°W

- Electoral division for the West Sussex County Council
- Horsham Riverside electoral division boundaries since 2009
- District: Horsham
- County: West Sussex
- Electorate: 9,260 (2021)
- Major settlements: Horsham

Current electoral division
- Created: 2005
- Number of members: 1
- Councillor: Louise Potter
- GSS code: E58001633

Horsham Riverside is an electoral division of West Sussex in the United Kingdom and returns one member to sit on West Sussex County Council.

== West Sussex council elections since 2009 ==
There was a revision of electoral division boundaries in West Sussex in 2009.

=== 2025 by-election ===
The by-election took place on 22 May 2025.

2025 Horsham Riverside by-election
| Party | Candidate | Votes | % | ±% |
|---|---|---|---|---|
| Liberal Democrats | Louise Potter | 1,193 | 45.7 | |
| Conservative | David Thomson | 569 | 21.8 | |
| Reform UK | Jack Nye | 547 | 21.0 | |
| Labour | David Hide | 181 | 6.9 | |
| Green | Jen Nuin Smith | 118 | 4.5 | |
| Turnout | | | | |
| Liberal Democrats hold | | Swing | | |

=== 2021 election ===
The election took place on 6 May 2021.

2021 West Sussex County Council election: Horsham Riverside
| Party | Candidate | Votes | % | ±% |
|---|---|---|---|---|
| Liberal Democrats | John Milne | 1,653 | 46.0 | +2.4 |
| Conservative | Tony Hogben | 1,244 | 34.6 | −2.3 |
| Labour | David Hide | 489 | 13.6 | +3.1 |
| Peace | Jim Duggan | 208 | 5.8 | +2.6 |
| Majority | | | | |
| Liberal Democrats hold | | Swing | | |

=== 2017 election ===
The election took place on 4 May 2017.

2017 West Sussex County Council election: Horsham Riverside
| Party | Candidate | Votes | % | ±% |
|---|---|---|---|---|
| Liberal Democrats | Morwen Millson | 1,320 | 43.6 | +4.6 |
| Conservative | Ross Dye | 1,119 | 36.9 | +11.6 |
| Labour | David Hide | 318 | 10.5 | +1.6 |
| UKIP | Ray Toots | 176 | 5.8 | −17.2 |
| Peace | Jim Duggan | 97 | 3.2 | −0.6 |
| Majority | | 201 | 6.7 | −7.0 |
| Turnout | | 3,030 | 35.9 | +3.1 |
| Liberal Democrats hold | | Swing | | |

=== 2013 election ===
The election took place on 2 May 2013.

2013 West Sussex County Council election: Horsham Riverside
| Party | Candidate | Votes | % | ±% |
|---|---|---|---|---|
| Liberal Democrats | Morwen Millson | 1,053 | 39.0 | −16.7 |
| Conservative | David Scozzafava | 683 | 25.3 | −10.7 |
| UKIP | Douglas Rands | 620 | 23.0 | N/A |
| Labour | David Hide | 239 | 8.9 | +5.1 |
| Peace | Jim Duggan | 102 | 3.8 | −0.7 |
| Majority | | 370 | 13.7 | −6.0 |
| Turnout | | 2,697 | 32.8 | −11.8 |
| Liberal Democrats hold | | Swing | -3.0% | |

=== 2009 election ===
The election took place on 4 June 2009.

2009 West Sussex County Council election: Horsham Riverside
| Party | Candidate | Votes | % | ±% |
|---|---|---|---|---|
| Liberal Democrats | Morwen Millson | 1,985 | 55.7 | |
| Conservative | Andrew Baldwin | 1,283 | 36.0 | |
| Peace | Jim Duggan | 159 | 4.5 | |
| Labour | Jonathan Austin | 137 | 3.8 | |
| Majority | | 702 | 19.7 | |
| Turnout | | 3,564 | 44.6 | |
| Liberal Democrats win (new boundaries) | | | | |

== 2005–2009 West Sussex council elections ==
There was a revision of electoral division boundaries in West Sussex in 2005.

=== 2005 election ===
The election took place on 5 May 2005.

2005 West Sussex County Council election: Horsham Riverside
| Party | Candidate | Votes | % | ±% |
|---|---|---|---|---|
| Liberal Democrats | Morwen Millson | 3,015 | 52.0 | |
| Conservative | N Lowson | 1,915 | 33.0 | |
| Labour | J Thomas | 873 | 15.0 | |
| Majority | | 1,100 | 19.0 | |
| Turnout | | 5,803 | 67.3 | |
| Liberal Democrats win (new seat) | | | | |
