= 2017 West Sussex County Council election =

2017 UK local government election

← 2013	4 May 2017	2021 →

All 70 seats to West Sussex County Council 36 seats needed for a majority
	First party	Second party	Third party
Party	Conservative	Liberal Democrats	Labour
Last election	46	8	6
Seats won	56	9	5
Seat change	▲10	▲1	▼1
- Map showing the results of the 2017 West Sussex County Council elections.
Council control before election
Conservative
Council control after election
Conservative

The 2017 West Sussex County Council election took place as part of the 2017 local elections in the UK. All councillors were elected for single-member electoral divisions for a four-year term. The voting system used was first-past-the-post.

Boundary changes to the electoral divisions took effect following a review by the Local Government Boundary Commission for England.

The result was Conservative councillors formed an increased, 20-seat, majority on the council at the loss of the ten UKIP seats. The second-largest party grouping of councillors remained Liberal Democrats, gaining one seat to have nine seats and the balance of the council was formed by five Labour Party councillors, having lost one seat, net.

== Results summary ==
West Sussex County Council election, 2017
Party	Seats	Gains	Losses	Net gain/loss	Seats %	Votes %	Votes	+/−
Conservative	56	13	3	▲10	80.0	51.3	112,066	+12.9
Liberal Democrats	9	3	2	▲1	12.9	19.2	41,923	+4.8
Labour	5	0	1	▼1	7.1	15.5	33,897	+1.6
UKIP	0	0	10	▼10	0.0	6.3	13,803	-23.0
Green	0			Steady	0.0	5.1	11,065	+2.6
Independent	0			Steady	0.0	2.4	5,293	+1.1
Something New	0			Steady	0.0	0.1	199	+0.1
Peace	0			Steady	0.0	0.0	97	n/a
Monster Raving Loony	0			Steady	0.0	0.0	41	n/a
Justice Party	0			Steady	0.0	0.0	23	n/a
Patria	0			Steady	0.0	0.0	21	n/a

== Results by electoral division ==
West Sussex is composed of 7 districts: Adur District, Arun District, Chichester District, Crawley Borough, Horsham District, Mid Sussex District and Worthing Borough. The following results are grouped by district.

=== Adur ===
Lancing
Party	Candidate	Votes	%	±%
Conservative	Ann Bridges	1,385	44.4	+23.9
Labour	Lee Cowen	550	17.6	+6.5
UKIP	Roger Arthur	443	17.5	−36.3
Liberal Democrats	Doris Martin	438	14.1	+4.2
Green	Paul Hendy	201	6.4	+1.6
Majority		835	26.8	
Turnout		3,118	31.1	+1.3
Conservative gain from UKIP		Swing	+30.1	

Shoreham North
Party	Candidate	Votes	%	±%
Conservative	Debbie Kennard	1,728	51.3	
Labour	Jed Smith	748	22.2	
UKIP	Paul Graysmark	319	9.5	
Liberal Democrats	Stephen Martin	304	9.0	
Green	Lynn Finnigan	270	8.0	
Majority		980	29.1	
Turnout		2,239	29.1	
Conservative win (new seat)				

Shoreham South
Party	Candidate	Votes	%	±%
Conservative	Kevin Boram	1,637	46.3	
Labour	Stephen Gilbert	885	25.0	
Green	Andrew Bradbury	390	11.0	
Liberal Democrats	Andrew Tinsley	372	10.5	
UKIP	Geoffrey Patmore	252	7.1	
Majority		752	21.3	
Turnout		3,536	37.9	
Conservative win (new seat)				

Sompting & North Lancing
Party	Candidate	Votes	%	±%
Conservative	George Barton	1,752	51.7	+21.0
Labour	Michael Thornton	606	17.9	+3.3
UKIP	Charles Lowe	564	16.7	−28.8
Liberal Democrats	Stephen Creed	327	9.7	+5.4
Green	Leslie Groves Williams	139	4.1	−0.8
Majority		1,146	33.8	
Turnout		3,388	33.3	+4.4
Conservative gain from UKIP		Swing	+24.9	

Southwick
Party	Candidate	Votes	%	±%
Conservative	David Simmons	1,503	51.6	+15.4
Labour Co-op	Leslie Alden	839	28.8	+7.9
Liberal Democrats	Holly Creed	218	7.5	−0.3
UKIP	Jennifer Greig	211	7.2	−22.8
Green	Patrick Ginnelly	144	4.9	−0.2
Majority		664	22.8	+16.6
Turnout		2,915	31.4	+5.8
Conservative hold		Swing		

=== Arun ===
Angmering and Findon
Party	Candidate	Votes	%	±%
Conservative	Deborah Urquhart	1,753	61.5	+17.5
Liberal Democrats	David Bass	514	18.2	+9.0
Labour Co-op	Darren Pearce	384	13.5	+4.4
UKIP	Arthur Lardeur	201	7.1	−30.6
Majority		1,239	43.3	+36.9
Turnout		2,852	34.5	+3.3
Conservative hold		Swing		

Arundel and Courtwick
Party	Candidate	Votes	%	±%
Conservative	Gary Markwell	1,249	56.3	+14.2
Labour	Freddie Tandy	379	17.1	+0.2
Liberal Democrats	Mark Foster	298	13.4	+6.4
UKIP	John Wallace	165	7.4	−26.7
Green	Margaretha Trent	127	5.7	+5.7
Majority		870	39.2	+31.2
Turnout		2,218	31.5	+3.8
Conservative hold		Swing		

Bersted
Party	Candidate	Votes	%	±%
Conservative	David Edwards	901	33.4	+15.2
Liberal Democrats	Martin Smith	531	19.7	−1.0
UKIP	Ruth Kenward	498	18.5	−22.5
Labour	Vincent McCabe	390	14.5	−5.6
Independent	Gillian Yeates	270	10.0	+10.0
Green	David Meagher	105	3.9	+3.9
Majority		370	13.7	
Turnout		2,695	28.1	−0.1
Conservative gain from UKIP		Swing	+18.9	

Bognor Regis East
Party	Candidate	Votes	%	±%
Liberal Democrats	Francis Oppler	962	38.7	+3.5
Conservative	Katherine Eccles	644	25.9	+11.1
Labour	Heather Robbins	357	14.3	−1.9
UKIP	Chloe Watson	227	9.1	−24.7
Independent	Steve Goodheart	216	8.7	+8.7
Green	Conrad Meagher	83	3.3	+3.3
Majority		318	12.8	+11.4
Turnout		2,489	25.9	+1.4
Liberal Democrats hold		Swing		

Bognor Regis West and Aldwick
Party	Candidate	Votes	%	±%
Conservative	Ashvinkumar Patel	1,715	47.9	+11.5
Liberal Democrats	Paul Wells	1,089	30.4	+3.0
Labour	Alison Sharples	335	9.4	+3.6
UKIP	Matilda Watson	298	8.3	−22.1
Green	Susan Livett	146	4.1	+4.1
Majority		626	17.5	+11.5
Turnout		3,583	36.0	−0.1
Conservative hold		Swing		

East Preston and Ferring
Party	Candidate	Votes	%	±%
Conservative	Roger Elkins	2,994	72.0	+22.3
Labour	Rachel Keys	474	11.4	−3.0
Liberal Democrats	John Richards	427	10.3	+5.2
UKIP	Richard Setford	262	6.3	−24.9
Majority		2,520	60.6	+42.5
Turnout		4,157	41.2	+4.6
Conservative hold		Swing		

Felpham
Party	Candidate	Votes	%	±%
Conservative	Hilary Flynn	1,846	64.9	+31.1
Independent	Graham Jones	423	14.9	+14.9
Labour	Martin Eaves	241	8.5	+3.0
Liberal Democrats	Alan Gale	231	8.1	+4.9
Green	Nathan Meagher	104	3.7	+3.7
Majority		1,423	50	
Turnout		2,845	31.3	−3.9
Conservative gain from UKIP		Swing		

Fontwell
Party	Candidate	Votes	%	±%
Conservative	Derek Whittington	1,890	63.7	+19.4
Liberal Democrats	Barbara Roberts	303	10.2	−2.5
Green	Isabel Thurston	303	10.2	+10.2
Labour	Roger Nash	247	8.3	+1.6
UKIP	Patricia Wales	224	7.6	−26.6
Majority		1,587	53.5	+43.4
Turnout		2,967	32.1	+2.5
Conservative hold		Swing		

Littlehampton East
Party	Candidate	Votes	%	±%
Liberal Democrats	James Walsh	1,439	44.8	+5.7
Conservative	Stephen Haymes	1,302	40.5	+13.2
Labour	Maralyn May	356	11.1	+3.5
Green	Nathan Wyatt	119	3.7	+3.7
Majority		137	4.3	−7.5
Turnout		3,216	32.5	+0.4
Liberal Democrats hold		Swing		

Littlehampton Town
Party	Candidate	Votes	%	±%
Liberal Democrats	Ian Buckland	1,142	39.6	+9.0
Conservative	David Britton	924	32.1	+16.0
Labour Co-op	Alan Butcher	607	21.1	−0.4
Green	David Jones	141	4.9	+4.9
Independent	Joby Akira	69	2.4	+2.4
Majority		218	7.5	+3.7
Turnout		2,883	29.4	+1.7
Liberal Democrats hold		Swing		

Middleton
Party	Candidate	Votes	%	±%
Conservative	Jacqueline Pendleton	1,961	65.8	+24.6
Labour	Linda Shepperd	256	8.6	−1.4
Liberal Democrats	Kenton Batley	237	8.0	+0.8
UKIP	Yusuf Ali	196	6.6	−37.6
Independent	Derek Ambler	179	6.0	+6.0
Green	Sarah Rands	153	5.1	+5.1
Majority		1,705	57.2	
Turnout		2,982	33.9	+2.4
Conservative gain from UKIP		Swing	+31.1	

Nyetimber
Party	Candidate	Votes	%	±%
Conservative	Anita Hall	1,996	57.5	+23.1
UKIP	Michael Warden	623	17.9	−31.0
Liberal Democrats	Brooke Olsen	363	10.5	+3.9
Labour	Jan Cosgrove	280	8.1	−2.0
Green	Carol Birch	211	6.1	+6.1
Majority		1,373	39.6	
Turnout		3,473	37.3	+4.3
Conservative gain from UKIP		Swing	+27.1	

Rustington
Party	Candidate	Votes	%	±%
Liberal Democrats	Daniel Purchase	1,970	46.0	+37.3
Conservative	Graham Tyler	1,853	43.3	−2.6
Labour	Nigel Stapley	237	5.5	−4.5
UKIP	Susan Waghorn	220	5.1	−30.3
Majority		117	2.7	
Turnout		4,280	44.1	+8.8
Liberal Democrats gain from Conservative		Swing	+20.0	

=== Chichester ===
Bourne
Party	Candidate	Votes	%	±%
Conservative	Viral Parikh	1,357	40.2	+2.3
UKIP	Sandra James	865	25.6	−15.0
Liberal Democrats	Rachel Keys	659	19.5	+7.7
Labour	Jane Towers	264	7.8	−1.9
Green	Ann Stewart	234	6.9	+6.9
Majority		492	14.6	
Turnout		3,379	35.3	+3.5
Conservative gain from UKIP		Swing	+8.7	

Chichester East
Party	Candidate	Votes	%	±%
Conservative	Simon Oakley	1,138	47.7	+12.7
Liberal Democrats	John Turbefield	692	29.0	+3.0
Labour	Mark Farwell	354	14.8	+1.1
Green	Polly Gaskin	204	8.5	+8.5
Majority		446	18.7	+9.7
Turnout		2,388	27.6	+3.2
Conservative hold		Swing		

Chichester North
Party	Candidate	Votes	%	±%
Conservative	Jeremy Hunt	1,946	56.0	+6.2
Liberal Democrats	Bethan Norrell	745	21.5	+5.3
Labour	Kevin Hughes	303	8.7	−1.8
Green	Sam Pickford	239	6.9	+6.9
UKIP	Michael Mason	150	4.3	−19.2
Independent	Joseph Brookes-Harmer	90	2.6	+2.6
Majority		1,201	34.5	+8.2
Turnout		3,473	38.0	+6.1
Conservative hold		Swing		

Chichester South
Party	Candidate	Votes	%	±%
Conservative	Jamie Fitzjohn	1,630	47.7	+7.6
Green	Sarah Sharp	944	27.6	+27.6
Liberal Democrats	Craig Gershater	550	16.1	−3.8
Labour	John Ball	292	8.6	−5.0
Majority		686	20.1	+6.3
Turnout		3,416	35.4	+7.8
Conservative hold		Swing		

Chichester West
Party	Candidate	Votes	%	±%
Conservative	Louise Goldsmith	2,185	55.4	+0.8
Liberal Democrats	Adrian Moss	1,046	26.5	+15.6
Labour	James Hobson	279	7.1	−3.4
Green	Lynne Waylen	242	6.1	+6.1
UKIP	Bernard Smith	173	4.4	−18.7
Patria	Andrew Emerson	21	0.5	−0.3
Majority		1,139	28.9	−2.6
Turnout		3,946	41.1	+8.9
Conservative hold		Swing		

Midhurst
Party	Candidate	Votes	%	±%
Liberal Democrats	Kate O’Kelly	1,263	34.8	+27.6
Conservative	Alan Sutton	1,214	33.4	+6.5
Independent	Gordon McAra	1,040	28.6	−2.8
Green	Philip Amber	114	3.1	+3.1
Majority		49	1.4	
Turnout		3,631	41.9	+10.9
Liberal Democrats gain from Independent		Swing	+15.2	

Petworth
Party	Candidate	Votes	%	±%
Conservative	Janet Duncton	2,568	74.3	+19.5
Liberal Democrats	Natalie Hume	592	17.1	+4.4
UKIP	Jeannie Dunning	166	4.8	−21.2
Independent	Andrew Young	130	3.8	+3.8
Majority		1,976	57.2	+28.4
Turnout		3,456	35.8	+4.1
Conservative hold		Swing		

Rother Valley
Party	Candidate	Votes	%	±%
Conservative	David Bradford	2,076	69.5	
Liberal Democrats	David Hares	617	20.7	
Labour	John Smith	294	9.8	
Majority		1,459	48.8	
Turnout		2,987	35.0	
Conservative win (new seat)				

Selsey
Party	Candidate	Votes	%	±%
Conservative	Carol Purnell	1,480	51.4	+9.8
Independent	Donna Johnson	784	27.3	+27.3
UKIP	Andrew Moncreiff	227	7.9	−37.9
Labour	Donna Gabriel	210	7.3	−5.4
Liberal Democrats	Simon Scotland	97	3.4	+3.4
Green	John Cluley	79	2.8	+2.8
Majority		696	24.1	
Turnout		2,877	33.2	+3.3
Conservative gain from UKIP		Swing	+23.9	

The Witterings
Party	Candidate	Votes	%	±%
Conservative	Pieter Montyn	2,242	68.5	+17.0
Liberal Democrats	Jane Scotland	339	10.4	+4.3
Labour	Joe O’Sullivan	282	8.6	−0.1
UKIP	Patricia Hunt	258	7.9	−25.8
Green	Stephanie Can	154	4.7	+4.7
Majority		1,903	58.1	+40.3
Turnout		3,275	38.8	+9.0
Conservative hold		Swing		

=== Crawley ===
Bewbush and Ifield West
Party	Candidate	Votes	%	±%
Labour	Chris Oxlade	1,040	45.2	−3.4
Conservative	Duncan Peck	804	35.0	+15.2
UKIP	Christopher Brown	236	10.3	−15.5
Liberal Democrats	Sarah Smith	121	5.3	+1.6
Green	Martin Kail	75	3.3	+3.3
Justice	Arshad Khan	23	1.0	−1.1
Majority		236	10.2	−12.6
Turnout		2,299	25.5	+3.0
Labour hold		Swing		

Broadfield
Party	Candidate	Votes	%	±%
Labour	Brian Quinn	1,310	54.9	+4.4
Conservative	Irshad Jalaldeen	662	27.7	+4.7
UKIP	George Bird	267	11.2	−11.0
Green	Charlotte Franco	76	3.2	+3.2
Liberal Democrats	Stephen Tall	73	3.1	+0.7
Majority		648	27.2	−0.3
Turnout		2,388	26.5	+3.2
Labour hold		Swing		

Langley Green & Ifield East
Party	Candidate	Votes	%	±%
Labour	Brenda Smith	1,343	48.3	
Conservative	Brenda Burgess	1,012	36.4	
UKIP	Sharon Kennett	202	7.3	
Liberal Democrats	Mike Sargent	137	4.9	
Green	Ben Fletcher	89	3.2	
Majority		331	11.9	
Turnout		2,783	29.7	
Labour win (new seat)				

Maidenbower & Worth
Party	Candidate	Votes	%	±%
Conservative	Bob Lanzer	1,962	65.1	
Labour	Peter Smith	540	17.9	
Liberal Democrats	Paul Cummings	292	9.7	
UKIP	Leonard Elphick	132	4.4	
Green	Daniel Fletcher	87	2.9	
Majority		1,422	47.2	
Turnout		3,013	34.2	
Conservative win (new seat)				

Northgate & West Green
Party	Candidate	Votes	%	±%
Labour	Sue Mullins	1,196	49.4	
Conservative	Ian Pendlington	852	35.2	
UKIP	Kevin Williams	154	6.4	
Liberal Democrats	Marko Scepanovic	120	5.0	
Green	Sam Wiltshire	100	4.1	
Majority		344	14.2	
Turnout		2,422	30.2	
Labour win (new seat)				

Pound Hill
Party	Candidate	Votes	%	±%
Conservative	Richard Burrett	1,435	66.0	
Labour	Tahira Rana	416	19.1	
Liberal Democrats	Valerie Spooner	155	7.1	
Green	Daniel Elliot	92	4.2	
UKIP	Janet Setford-Thompson	75	3.5	
Majority		1,019	46.9	
Turnout		2,172	33.1	
Conservative win (new seat)				

Southgate and Gossops Green
Party	Candidate	Votes	%	±%
Labour	Michael Jones	1,550	44.9	
Conservative	Kim Jaggard	1,527	44.2	
UKIP	Neil Setford-Thompson	219	6.3	
Green	Richard Kail	158	4.6	
Majority		23	0.7	
Turnout		3,453	35.4	
Labour win (new seat)				

Three Bridges
Party	Candidate	Votes	%	±%
Conservative	Charles Petts	1,303	45.0	
Labour	Julian Charatan	1,157	33.9	
Liberal Democrats	David Anderson	164	5.7	
UKIP	Martin Rann	155	5.3	
Green	Danielle Kail	119	4.1	
Majority		146	11.1	
Turnout		2,898	34.7	
Conservative win (new seat)				

Tilgate and Furnace Green
Party	Candidate	Votes	%	±%
Conservative	Duncan Crow	1,934	58.1	+13.8
Labour	Raj Sharma	955	28.7	−3.2
UKIP	Allan Griffiths	187	5.6	−10.9
Liberal Democrats	Kevin Osborne	170	5.1	+3.2
Green	Derek Hardman	81	2.4	−1.4
Majority		979	29.4	+17.0
Turnout		3,328	37.6	+0.3
Conservative hold		Swing		

=== Horsham ===
Billingshurst
Party	Candidate	Votes	%	±%
Conservative	Amanda Jupp	1,898	63.3	+20.5
Liberal Democrats	Richard Greenwood	545	18.2	+8.6
Labour	Robert Brown	283	9.4	+0.7
UKIP	Graham Harper	271	9.0	−29.8
Majority		1,353	45.1	+41.1
Turnout		2,997	32.5	+4.9
Conservative hold		Swing		

Bramber Castle
Party	Candidate	Votes	%	±%
Conservative	David Barling	1,849	53.8	+11.5
Liberal Democrats	Ross Wellby	886	25.8	−1.3
Labour	Simon Birnstingl	336	9.8	+0.6
Green	Jo Prior	263	7.6	+7.6
UKIP	Ivan Hunter	106	3.1	−18.3
Majority		963	28.0	+12.8
Turnout		3,440	37.9	+3.7
Conservative hold		Swing		

Broadbridge
Party	Candidate	Votes	%	±%
Conservative	Christian Mitchell	1,673	57.9	
Liberal Democrats	Matthew Gaffar	644	22.3	
Labour	Cameron McGillivray	220	7.6	
Green	Catherine Ross	184	6.4	
UKIP	Patrick Dearsley	168	5.8	
Majority		1,029	35.6	
Turnout		2,889	32.2	
Conservative win (new seat)				

Henfield
Party	Candidate	Votes	%	±%
Conservative	Lionel Barling	2,051	70.4	+19.0
Liberal Democrats	David Boyle	471	16.2	+5.7
Labour	Helen Wright	391	13.4	+5.0
Majority		1,580	54.2	+32.6
Turnout		2,913	34.4	+5.5
Conservative hold		Swing		

Holbrook
Party	Candidate	Votes	%	±%
Conservative	Peter Catchpole	1,973	62.9	+16.7
Liberal Democrats	Warwick Hellawell	653	20.8	+2.6
Labour	Raymond Chapman	314	10.0	−0.2
Something New	James Smith	199	6.3	+6.3
Majority		1,320	42.1	+21.2
Turnout		3,139	36.3	+5.9
Conservative hold		Swing		

Horsham East
Party	Candidate	Votes	%	±%
Conservative	Andrew Baldwin	1,709	48.4	
Liberal Democrats	Frances Haigh	1,169	33.1	
Labour	Ian Nicol	293	8.3	
UKIP	Mike Rowlands	215	6.1	
Green	Ferial Mactavish	144	4.1	
Majority		540	15.3	
Turnout		3,560	39.8	
Conservative win (new seat)				

Horsham Hurst
Party	Candidate	Votes	%	±%
Liberal Democrats	Nigel Dennis	1,909	52.7	+8.3
Conservative	Alan Britten	1,160	32.0	+7.4
Labour	Carol Hayton	430	11.9	+0.3
UKIP	Robin Monk	121	3.3	−16.1
Majority		749	20.7	+0.9
Turnout		3,620	42.3	+8.1
Liberal Democrats hold		Swing		

Horsham Riverside
Party	Candidate	Votes	%	±%
Liberal Democrats	Morwen Millson	1,320	43.6	+4.6
Conservative	Ross Dye	1,119	36.9	+11.6
Labour	David Hide	318	10.5	+1.6
UKIP	Ray Toots	176	5.8	−17.2
Peace	Jim Duggan	97	3.2	−0.6
Majority		201	6.7	−7.0
Turnout		3,030	35.9	+3.1
Liberal Democrats hold		Swing		

Pulborough
Party	Candidate	Votes	%	±%
Conservative	Pat Arculus	2,317	65.7	+22.0
Liberal Democrats	Samuel Hancock	610	17.3	+11.8
Labour	Jane Mote	338	9.6	+4.6
UKIP	Liz Wallace	260	7.4	−29.3
Majority		1,707	48.4	+41.4
Turnout		3,526	36.9	+4.2
Conservative hold		Swing		

Southwater & Nuthurst Division
Party	Candidate	Votes	%	±%
Conservative	Nigel Jupp	1,574	55.1	+13.7
Liberal Democrats	Bob Wheatcroft	720	25.2	+9.1
Labour	Kevin O'Sullivan	195	6.8	+0.1
Green	Peter Shaw	193	6.8	+6.8
UKIP	Gloria Eveleigh	177	6.2	−29.6
Majority		854	29.9	+24.3
Turnout		2,859	30.3	−0.1
Conservative hold		Swing		

St Leonards Forest
Party	Candidate	Votes	%	±%
Conservative	Liz Kitchen	1,179	62.1	
Liberal Democrats	Anthony Bevis	333	17.5	
Labour	Rosalind Hillman	196	10.3	
UKIP	Raymond Butler	191	10.1	
Majority		846	44.6	
Turnout		1,899	30.4	
Conservative win (new seat)				

Storrington
Party	Candidate	Votes	%	±%
Conservative	Paul Marshall	2,389	62.0	+14.1
Liberal Democrats	Steve Holbrook	782	20.3	+6.2
Labour	Caroline Fife	379	9.8	+9.8
UKIP	Peter Grace	302	7.8	−30.2
Majority		1,607	41.7	+31.8
Turnout		3,852	38.0	+4.9
Conservative hold		Swing		

=== Mid Sussex ===
Burgess Hill East
Party	Candidate	Votes	%	±%
Conservative	Anne Jones	1,440	41.2	+7.3
Liberal Democrats	Roger Cartwright	1,060	30.4	+12.3
Labour	Pamela Haigh	371	10.6	−6.4
Independent	Scott McCarthy	287	8.2	+8.2
UKIP	Chris French	195	5.6	−19.9
Green	Matthew Cornish	139	4.0	−1.6
Majority		380	10.8	+2.4
Turnout		3,492	37.5	+2.5
Conservative hold		Swing		

Burgess Hill North
Party	Candidate	Votes	%	±%
Conservative	Andrew Barrett-Miles	1,359	40.2	
Independent	Peter Chapman	817	24.1	
Liberal Democrats	Lee Gibbs	476	14.1	
Labour	Simon Hayward	463	13.7	
UKIP	Timothy Cooper	144	4.3	
Green	Anne Eves	125	3.7	
Majority		542	16.1	
Turnout		3,384	34.2	
Conservative win (new seat)				

Cuckfield and Lucastes
Party	Candidate	Votes	%	±%
Conservative	Pete Bradbury	1,641	57.2	+8.6
Liberal Democrats	Stephen Blanch	711	24.8	+7.0
Labour	Sarah Moss	286	10.0	−1.4
Green	Catherine Edminson	229	8.0	+8.0
Majority		930	32.4	+6.0
Turnout		2,867	32.4	−0.6
Conservative hold		Swing		

East Grinstead Meridian
Party	Candidate	Votes	%	±%
Conservative	Liz Bennett	1,524	65.1	+17.1
Labour	Michael Miller	294	12.6	+4.8
Liberal Democrats	Susan Knight	261	11.2	−3.5
Green	James Symons	148	6.3	+1.0
UKIP	Ian Simcock	113	4.8	−19.4
Majority		1,230	52.5	+28.7
Turnout		2,341	26.6	+1.7
Conservative hold		Swing		

East Grinstead South and Ashurst Wood
Party	Candidate	Votes	%	±%
Conservative	Jacquie Russell	1,505	55.8	+12.0
Liberal Democrats	Paul Johnson	626	23.2	+4.3
Green	Elaine Eichner	241	8.9	+1.2
Labour	David Wilbraham	195	7.2	+0.7
UKIP	Barry Noldart	129	4.8	−18.3
Majority		879	32.6	+11.9
Turnout		2,696	29.5	+2.0
Conservative hold		Swing		

Hassocks and Burgess Hill South
Party	Candidate	Votes	%	±%
Liberal Democrats	Kirsty Lord	1,545	38.9	
Conservative	Tudor Ellis	1,525	38.4	
Labour	Linda Taylor	549	13.8	
UKIP	Charles Burrell	182	4.6	
Green	Nicholas Dearden	175	4.4	
Majority		20	0.5	
Turnout		3,977	43.7	
Liberal Democrats win (new seat)				

Haywards Heath East
Party	Candidate	Votes	%	±%
Conservative	Stephen Hillier	1,317	51.5	+17.7
Labour	William Blunden	460	18.0	−3.6
Liberal Democrats	Stephanie Inglesfield	438	17.1	−1.1
UKIP	Howard Burrell	193	7.6	−18.8
Green	Gillian Maher	147	5.8	+5.8
Majority		857	33.5	+27.1
Turnout		2,555	30.4	+0.7
Conservative hold		Swing		

Haywards Heath Town
Party	Candidate	Votes	%	±%
Conservative	Sujan Wickremaratchi	1,459	47.8	+11.9
Liberal Democrats	Richard Bates	990	32.4	+10.2
Labour	Hilary Schan-Martyn	443	14.5	−4.2
Green	David Woolley	161	5.3	+5.3
Majority		469	15.4	+2.7
Turnout		3,053	35.4	+2.8
Conservative hold		Swing		

Hurstpierpoint & Bolney
Party	Candidate	Votes	%	±%
Conservative	Joy Dennis	1,821	49.7	+0.6
Liberal Democrats	Alison Bennett	982	26.8	+13.7
Labour	Norina O'Hare	396	10.8	+2.8
Green	Mike Airey	280	7.6	−3.4
UKIP	Peter Hopgood	142	3.9	−14.9
Monster Raving Loony	Baron Thunderclap	41	1.1	+1.1
Majority		839	22.9	−7.4
Turnout		3,662	38.0	+5.1
Conservative hold		Swing		

Imberdown
Party	Candidate	Votes	%	±%
Conservative	Heidi Brunsdon	1,476	47.8	+4.6
Independent	Ian Gibson	988	32.0	+32.0
Liberal Democrats	Graham Knight	215	7.0	−17.3
Labour	Deborah Miles	188	6.1	+6.1
UKIP	Brian Bezzant	115	3.7	−28.7
Green	Justin Morgan	104	3.4	+3.4
Majority		488	15.8	+5.0
Turnout		3,086	35.2	+5.3
Conservative hold		Swing		

Lindfield and High Weald
Party	Candidate	Votes	%	±%
Conservative	Andrew Lea	2,233	58.5	+9.3
Liberal Democrats	Anne-Marie Lucraft	604	15.8	+7.3
Green	Paul Brown	496	13.0	−2.1
Labour	Lisa Desbruslais	353	9.3	+1.9
UKIP	Eric Prior	129	3.4	−16.5
Majority		1,629	42.7	+13.4
Turnout		3,817	38.5	+3.5
Conservative hold		Swing		

Worth Forest
Party	Candidate	Votes	%	±%
Conservative	Bill Acraman	1,937	64.6	+20.5
Liberal Democrats	Henry Fleming	416	13.9	+7.7
Labour	Susannah Brady	283	9.4	−3.0
Green	Darrin Green	213	7.1	−0.2
UKIP	Marielena Burrell	148	4.9	−25.1
Majority		1,521	50.7	+36.6
Turnout		2,997	30.0	+0.9
Conservative hold		Swing		

=== Worthing ===
Broadwater
Party	Candidate	Votes	%	±%
Conservative	Bryan Turner	1,290	42.0	+10.8
Labour	Lorna Beaumont	1,035	33.7	+18.0
Liberal Democrats	John Aspey	365	11.9	−13.7
Green	Richard Battson	196	6.4	+6.4
UKIP	Christopher Gould	185	6.0	−21.5
Majority		255	8.3	+4.6
Turnout		3,071	32.7	+9.0
Conservative hold		Swing		

Cissbury
Party	Candidate	Votes	%	±%
Conservative	Elizabeth Sparkes	2,225	65.9	+24.0
Liberal Democrats	Jackie Cranefield	429	12.7	+5.0
Labour	Margaret Howard	355	10.5	+4.3
UKIP	Adam Fitchett	207	6.1	−32.9
Green	Daniel Parsonage	159	4.7	−0.5
Majority		1,796	53.2	+50.3
Turnout		3,375	38.3	+6.3
Conservative hold		Swing		

Durrington & Salvington
Party	Candidate	Votes	%	±%
Conservative	Noel Atkins	1,553	51.1	+14.3
Liberal Democrats	Hazel Thorpe	629	20.7	+6.4
Labour	Guy Chadwick	390	12.8	+2.3
UKIP	Mike Jelliss	331	10.9	−27.5
Green	Stephen Carleysmith	137	4.5	+4.5
Majority		924	30.4	
Turnout		3,040	31.1	+5.8
Conservative gain from UKIP		Swing	+20.9	

Goring
Party	Candidate	Votes	%	±%
Conservative	Steve Waight	1,996	61.3	+19.3
Labour	Rebecca Cooper	454	13.9	+5.1
Liberal Democrats	Antony Brown	368	11.3	+3.9
UKIP	Richard Bater	238	7.3	−27.7
Green	David Aherne	201	6.2	−0.7
Majority		1,542	47.4	+40.4
Turnout		3,257	38.0	+6.7
Conservative hold		Swing		

Northbrook
Party	Candidate	Votes	%	±%
Conservative	Sean McDonald	1,315	49.8	+18.5
Liberal Democrats	Jamie Bennett	516	19.6	−11.9
Labour	Adrienne Davis	364	13.8	+4.2
UKIP	Mark Withers	310	11.7	−12.4
Green	Julian Warrick	134	5.1	+1.6
Majority		799	30.2	
Turnout		2,639	29.4	+3.1
Conservative gain from Liberal Democrats		Swing	+15.2	

Tarring
Party	Candidate	Votes	%	±%
Liberal Democrats	Bob Smytherman	1,304	38.4	+5.3
Conservative	Vino Vinojan	1,184	34.8	+11.8
Labour	David Lace	506	14.9	+6.0
UKIP	Adrian Price	229	6.7	−20.6
Green	Constantine de Goguel	177	5.2	−2.5
Majority		120	3.6	−2.2
Turnout		3,401	34.4	+8.4
Liberal Democrats hold		Swing		

Worthing East
Party	Candidate	Votes	%	±%
Conservative	Roger Oakley	1,210	38.4	+8.1
Labour	Mike Barrett	1,182	37.5	+17.6
Liberal Democrats	Yvonne Leonard	341	10.8	−13.5
Green	Rosie Turner	214	6.8	+6.8
UKIP	Graham Adams	201	6.4	−19.1
Majority		28	0.9	−3.9
Turnout		3,148	34.6	+8.6
Conservative hold		Swing		

Worthing Pier
Party	Candidate	Votes	%	±%
Conservative	Michael Cloake	1,197	37.2	+8.1
Labour	Jim Deen	1,000	31.1	+18.7
Green	James Doyle	618	19.2	−3.4
Liberal Democrats	Christine Brown	236	7.3	−7.7
UKIP	Sue Jelliss	166	5.2	−15.7
Majority		197	6.1	−0.4
Turnout		3,218	33.8	+9.3
Conservative hold		Swing		

Worthing West
Party	Candidate	Votes	%	±%
Conservative	Paul High	1,605	51.6	+12.9
Labour	Richard Mulholland	681	21.9	+10.7
Liberal Democrats	Keith Sunderland	372	12.0	+2.8
Green	Caroline Ponto	264	8.5	−0.3
UKIP	Trevor England	189	6.1	−26.0
Majority		924	29.7	+23.1
Turnout		3,131	35.2	+8.6
Conservative hold		Swing		
