= 2019 Horsham District Council election =

2019 UK local government election

- 2 May 2019

All 48 seats to Horsham District Council 25 seats needed for a majority

	First party	Second party	Third party
Party	Conservative	Liberal Democrats	Green
Seats won	32	13	2
Seat change	▼7	▲9	▲2
Popular vote	37,929	22,110	2,784
Percentage	48.5%	28.3%	3.6%
	Fourth party
Party	Independent
Seats won	1
Seat change	Steady
Popular vote	1,088
Percentage	1.4%
- Map of the results of the election by ward

The 2019 Horsham District Council election took place on 2 May 2019 to elect members of Horsham District Council in England. It was held on the same day as other local elections. Every seat was contested and the Conservatives retained control of the council with a majority of 8.

== Council composition ==
Prior to the election, the composition of the council was:

↓
39	4	1
Con	LDem	Ind

After the election, the composition of the council was:

↓
32	13	2	1
Con	LDem	Grn	Ind

== Results summary ==
2019 Horsham District Council election
Party	Candidates	Seats	Gains	Losses	Net gain/loss	Seats %	Votes %	Votes	+/−
Conservative	48	32	N/A	N/A	▼7	66.7	48.5	37,929	–7.9
Liberal Democrats	29	13	N/A	N/A	▲9	27.1	28.3	22,110	+11.1
Green	4	2	N/A	N/A	▲2	4.2	3.6	2,784	–2.3
Independent	1	1	N/A	N/A	Steady	2.1	1.4	1,088	–1.0
Labour	39	0	N/A	N/A	Steady	0.0	14.7	11,535	+6.9
UKIP	9	0	N/A	N/A	Steady	0.0	3.1	2,456	–7.0
Peace	1	0	N/A	N/A	Steady	0.0	0.4	314	+0.1

== Ward results ==
=== Billingshurst ===
Billingshurst (3 seats)
Party	Candidate	Votes	%
Conservative	Christopher Brown	993	48.9
Conservative	Nigel Jupp	942	46.4
Conservative	Kathleen Rowbottom	778	38.3
Liberal Democrats	John Trollope	721	35.5
Liberal Democrats	Richard Greenwood	596	29.4
Labour	Andrea Grainger	326	16.1
UKIP	Graham Harper	298	14.7
Labour	Karon Barber	294	14.5
Labour	Brian Johnson	233	11.5
Turnout		2,029	28.65
Registered electors		7,082	
Rejected ballots		19	0.9
Conservative win (new seat)			
Conservative win (new seat)			
Conservative win (new seat)			

=== Bramber, Upper Beeding & Woodmancote ===
Bramber, Upper Beeding & Woodmancote (2 seats)
Party	Candidate	Votes	%	±%
Green	Michael Croker	702	46.6	+16.8
Conservative	Roger Noel	636	42.3	−16.9
Conservative	David Coldwell	612	40.7	
Labour	Simon Birnstingl	518	34.4	+14.3
UKIP	Vincent Hardy	172	11.4	+8.5
Turnout		1,505	35.02	
Registered electors		4,298		
Rejected ballots		5	0.3	
Green gain from Conservative				
Conservative hold				

=== Broadbridge Heath ===
Broadbridge Heath (2 seats)
Party	Candidate	Votes	%	±%
Liberal Democrats	Louise Potter	722	58.9	+23.8
Liberal Democrats	Matthew Allen	613	50.0	
Conservative	Matthew French	380	31.0	−9.7
Conservative	Mark Vallance	324	26.4	
Labour	Diane Burstow	134	10.9	+10.8
Labour	Cameron McGillivray	106	8.7	
Turnout		1,225	30.08	
Registered electors		4,072		
Rejected ballots		22	1.8	
Liberal Democrats gain from Conservative				
Liberal Democrats win (new seat)				

=== Colgate & Rusper ===
Colgate & Rusper (2 seats)
Party	Candidate	Votes	%
Conservative	Elizabeth Kitchen	684	71.7
Conservative	Antony Hogben	618	64.8
Labour	Donald Mahon	199	20.9
Labour	John Ivatts	175	18.3
Turnout		954	27.22
Registered electors		3,505	
Rejected ballots		29	3.0
Conservative win (new seat)			
Conservative win (new seat)			

=== Cowfold, Shermanbury & West Grinstead ===
Cowfold, Shermanbury & West Grinstead (2 seats)
Party	Candidate	Votes	%	±%
Conservative	Lynn Lambert	901	64.7	+0.1
Conservative	Jonathan Chowen	894	64.2	
Labour	Gabrielle Barrett	359	25.8	+28.5
Turnout		1,392	32.08	
Registered electors		4,339		
Rejected ballots		89	6.4	
Conservative hold				
Conservative hold				

=== Denne ===
Denne (3 seats)
Party	Candidate	Votes	%	±%
Liberal Democrats	Ruth Fletcher	1,287	50.6	+32.3
Liberal Democrats	Belinda Walters	1,221	48.0	
Liberal Democrats	Frances Haigh	1,216	47.8	
Conservative	Adrian Lee	871	34.3	+2.7
Conservative	Graham Dye	849	33.4	
Conservative	Simon Whalley	780	30.7	
Labour	Jill Clarke	368	14.5	−1.0
Labour	Joanne Kavanagh	312	12.3	
Labour	Kevin O'Sullivan	280	11.0	
Turnout		2,543	35.47	
Registered electors		7,169		
Rejected ballots		42	1.7	
Liberal Democrats gain from Conservative				
Liberal Democrats gain from Conservative				
Liberal Democrats win (new seat)				

=== Forest ===
Forest (3 seats)
Party	Candidate	Votes	%	±%
Liberal Democrats	David Skipp	1,305	44.4	−8.7
Liberal Democrats	David Newman	1,224	41.7	
Liberal Democrats	Colin Minto	1,120	38.1	
Labour	Carol Hayton	742	25.3	+22.4
Labour	David Hide	719	24.5	
Conservative	Kimberley Williams	703	23.9	−21.0
Conservative	John Knightley	623	21.2	
Labour	Gerard Kavanagh	613	20.9	
Conservative	Michael Revell	567	19.3	
Peace	James Duggan	314	10.7	+9.5
UKIP	Raymond Toots	243	8.3	+7.3
Turnout		2,936	43.68	
Registered electors		6,721		
Rejected ballots		13	0.4	
Liberal Democrats hold				
Liberal Democrats win (new seat)				
Liberal Democrats win (new seat)				

=== Henfield ===
Henfield (2 seats)
Party	Candidate	Votes	%	±%
Independent	Michael Morgan	1,088	58.9	+4.4
Conservative	Jonathan Potts	614	33.3	−9.8
Green	Celia Emmott	531	28.8	+7.3
Conservative	Brian O'Connell	507	27.5	
Labour	Fiona Ayres	505	27.4	+7.1
Turnout		1,846	40.76	
Registered electors		4,529		
Rejected ballots		6	0.3	
Independent hold				
Conservative hold				

=== Holbrook East ===
Holbrook East (2 seats)
Party	Candidate	Votes	%	±%
Conservative	Andrew Baldwin	762	51.0	+6.1
Conservative	Karen Burgess	689	46.1	
Liberal Democrats	Eris Yeates	575	38.5	+17.5
Labour	Sheila Chapman	289	19.3	+2.9
Labour	Rosalind Hillman	282	18.9	
Turnout		1,494	33.39	
Registered electors		4,474		
Rejected ballots		39	2.6	
Conservative hold				
Conservative hold				

=== Holbrook West ===
Holbrook West (2 seats)
Party	Candidate	Votes	%	±%
Conservative	Peter Burgess	852	47.8	−0.6
Conservative	Christian Mitchell	830	46.5	
Liberal Democrats	Gregory Collins	613	34.4	+15.8
Liberal Democrats	Warwick Hellawell	560	31.4	
Labour	Susannah Brady	269	15.1	+1.7
Labour	Raymond Chapman	226	12.7	
Turnout		1,784	35.35	
Registered electors		5,047		
Rejected ballots		41	2.3	
Conservative hold				
Conservative hold				

=== Itchingfield, Slinfold & Warnham ===
Itchingfield, Slinfold & Warnham (2 seats)
Party	Candidate	Votes	%	±%
Conservative	Patricia Youtan	732	48.2	−5.5
Conservative	Stuart Ritchie	707	46.5	
Liberal Democrats	Katarzyna Greenwood	484	31.8	+14.9
Liberal Democrats	Peter Mullarky	436	28.7	
UKIP	Patrick Dearsley	216	14.2	−8.3
Labour	Sean Purdy	115	7.6	−1.4
Labour	Bernard Lumb	97	6.4	
Turnout		1,520	33.81	
Registered electors		4,496		
Rejected ballots		9	0.6	
Conservative hold				
Conservative hold				

=== Nuthurst & Lower Beeding ===
Nuthurst & Lower Beeding
Party	Candidate	Votes	%
Conservative	Antoinette Bradnum	571	58.3
Liberal Democrats	Dennis Livingstone	343	35.0
Labour	Ian Aird	66	6.7
Turnout		1,004	41.87
Registered electors		2,398	
Rejected ballots		24	2.4
Conservative win (new seat)			

=== Pulborough, Coldwaltham & Amberley ===
Pulborough, Coldwaltham & Amberley (3 seats)
Party	Candidate	Votes	%
Conservative	Paul Clarke	901	48.7
Conservative	Brian Donnelly	886	47.9
Conservative	Diana van der Klugt	837	45.3
Green	Kim Hope	687	37.2
Labour	Jane Mote	434	23.5
UKIP	John Wallace	391	21.1
Turnout		1,849	32.00
Registered electors		5,779	
Rejected ballots		10	0.5
Conservative win (new seat)			
Conservative win (new seat)			
Conservative win (new seat)			

=== Roffey North ===
Roffey North (2 seats)
Party	Candidate	Votes	%	±%
Liberal Democrats	Anthony Bevis	790	47.5	+22.7
Liberal Democrats	John Milne	732	44.0	
Conservative	Katherine Nagel	642	38.6	+3.2
Conservative	Alexander Shine	541	32.5	
Labour	Ian Nicol	238	14.3	+0.9
Labour	Matthew Verrall	193	11.6	
Turnout		1,663	34.09	
Registered electors		4,878		
Rejected ballots		40	2.4	
Liberal Democrats gain from Conservative				
Liberal Democrats gain from Conservative				

=== Roffey South ===
Roffey South (2 seats)
Party	Candidate	Votes	%	±%
Conservative	Roy Cornell	561	39.6	+0.4
Liberal Democrats	Alan Britten	553	39.1	+23.1
Conservative	Ben Staines	532	37.6	
Liberal Democrats	Nicholas Grant	519	36.7	
Labour	Lorraine Barry	239	16.9	+4.8
Labour	Joy Gough	225	15.9	
Turnout		1,416	28.10	
Registered electors		5,040		
Rejected ballots		40	2.8	
Conservative hold				
Liberal Democrats gain from Conservative				

=== Rudgwick ===
Rudgwick
Party	Candidate	Votes	%	±%
Conservative	Richard Landeryou	524	69.5	+15.1
Liberal Democrats	Matthew Potter	173	22.9	+23.0
Labour	Jane McGillivray	56	7.4	+7.4
Turnout		777	35.84	
Registered electors		2,168		
Rejected ballots		23	3.0	
Conservative hold				

=== Southwater North ===
Southwater North (2 seats)
Party	Candidate	Votes	%
Conservative	Billy Greening	842	52.6
Conservative	Claire Vickers	814	50.9
Liberal Democrats	Gary Hayes	561	35.1
Liberal Democrats	Henry Wheatcroft	557	34.8
Labour	Kevin Kilminster	155	9.7
Labour	Geoffrey Hillman	113	7.1
Turnout		1,600	36.82
Registered electors		4,346	
Rejected ballots		20	1.2
Conservative win (new seat)			
Conservative win (new seat)			

=== Southwater South & Shipley ===
Southwater South & Shipley (2 seats)
Party	Candidate	Votes	%
Conservative	Gordon Lindsay	675	44.3
Conservative	Ian Stannard	639	41.9
Liberal Democrats	Julie Stainton	575	37.7
Liberal Democrats	Peter Stainton	532	34.9
UKIP	Uri Baran	175	11.5
Labour	Margaret Cornwell	138	9.0
Labour	Jacob Keet	110	7.2
Turnout		1,525	31.66
Registered electors		4,817	
Rejected ballots		11	0.7
Conservative win (new seat)			
Conservative win (new seat)			

=== Steyning & Ashurst ===
Steyning & Ashurst (2 seats)
Party	Candidate	Votes	%
Green	Robert Platt	864	43.8
Conservative	Timothy Lloyd	842	42.7
Conservative	Dean Haysom	705	35.8
Labour	Caroline Fife	483	24.5
Labour	Lorraine Fowlie	327	16.6
UKIP	Terence Goodchild	270	13.7
Turnout		1,972	40.96
Registered electors		4,815	
Rejected ballots		12	0.6
Green win (new seat)			
Conservative win (new seat)			

=== Storrington & Washington ===
Storrington & Washington (3 seats)
Party	Candidate	Votes	%
Conservative	Raymond Dawe	1,584	60.2
Conservative	James Sanson	1,536	58.4
Conservative	Paul Marshall	1,439	54.7
Liberal Democrats	Stephen Holbrook-Sishton	939	35.7
Labour	James Monaghan	562	21.4
Turnout		2,632	35.50
Registered electors		7,415	
Rejected ballots		56	2.1
Conservative win (new seat)			
Conservative win (new seat)			
Conservative win (new seat)			

=== Trafalgar ===
Trafalgar (2 seats)
Party	Candidate	Votes	%	±%
Liberal Democrats	Christine Costin	1,243	57.0	+13.9
Liberal Democrats	Leonard Crosbie	1,155	52.9	
Conservative	Emily Baldwin	514	23.6	−6.2
Conservative	Peter Probert	460	21.1	
Labour	Karen Symes	357	16.4	+4.9
Labour	Michael Symes	290	13.3	
UKIP	Paul King	155	7.1	−3.0
Turnout		2,182	45.25	
Registered electors		4,822		
Rejected ballots		9	0.4	
Liberal Democrats hold				
Liberal Democrats hold				

=== West Chiltington, Thakeham & Ashington ===
West Chiltington, Thakeham & Ashington (3 seats)
Party	Candidate	Votes	%
Conservative	John Blackall	1,443	57.9
Conservative	Philip Circus	1,409	56.5
Conservative	Mohamed Saheid	1,184	47.5
Liberal Democrats	Ian Miles	745	29.9
UKIP	Roger Arthur	536	21.5
Labour	Helen Wright	388	15.6
Turnout		2,494	36.08
Registered electors		6,912	
Rejected ballots		15	0.6
Conservative win (new seat)			
Conservative win (new seat)			
Conservative win (new seat)			

== Changes 2019–2023 ==
The council held six by-elections during this term (see By-elections below). In addition, several councillors changed party affiliation without a seat being contested:

- 22 January 2023: Alan Britten (Roffey South) left the Liberal Democrats to rejoin the Conservatives, having originally been elected as a Conservative for Roffey North in 2015 before defecting to the Liberal Democrats in March 2019 and being elected under that label for Roffey South two months later.
- 22 January 2023: Jonathan Chowen (Cowfold, Shermanbury and West Grinstead), the Conservative group leader, left the party to sit as an independent, amid a leadership dispute within the Conservative group.
- 24 March 2023: Billy Greening (Southwater North) left the Conservatives to sit as an independent.

Both Chowen and Greening stood again as Conservative candidates at the 2023 election.

=== By-elections ===
==== Storrington & Washington ====
The by-election was held after Conservative councillor Paul Marshall stood down from Horsham District Council on becoming leader of West Sussex County Council in October 2019; the by-election was held on the same day as the December 2019 general election.

Storrington & Washington: 12 December 2019
Party	Candidate	Votes	%	±%
Conservative	James Wright	3,283	59.1	+3.2
Liberal Democrats	Alexander Beveridge	1,344	24.2	−12.3
Labour	James Monaghan	924	16.7	−5.1
Majority		1,939	34.9	+15.5
Turnout		5,551	72.9	+37.4
Conservative hold		Swing		

==== Trafalgar ====
The by-election was called after long-serving Liberal Democrat councillor Leonard Crosbie announced his retirement due to ill health, after 25 years' service. Crosbie died shortly afterwards; his death was confirmed by the Horsham & Crawley Liberal Democrats on 11 September 2020.

Trafalgar: 6 May 2021
Party	Candidate	Votes	%	±%
Liberal Democrats	Martin Boffey	1,581	65.4	+12.2
Conservative	Aaron Courteney-Smith	529	21.9	−1.8
Labour	Joanne Kavanagh	307	12.7	−3.7
Majority		1,052	43.5	
Turnout		2,427	49.6	
Registered electors		4,892		
Liberal Democrats hold		Swing		

==== Forest ====
The by-election was held after Liberal Democrat councillor Godfrey Newman, who had represented Forest since 1991 (with a four-year gap), stepped down due to ongoing health issues. He had also stood as the Liberal Democrats' parliamentary candidate for Horsham at the 2010 general election.

Forest: 21 October 2021
Party	Candidate	Votes	%	±%
Liberal Democrats	Jon Olson	921	47.4	+5.5
Labour	David Hide	517	26.6	+2.0
Conservative	Ross Dye	410	21.1	−3.0
Green	Jon Campbell	97	5.0	New
Majority		404	20.8	
Turnout		1,946	28.6	
Registered electors		6,814		
Liberal Democrats hold				

==== Roffey South ====
The by-election was held following the death of Conservative councillor Roy Cornell on 23 September 2021. Cornell had served continuously as ward member for Roffey South since first being elected on 3 May 2007.

Roffey South: 16 December 2021
Party	Candidate	Votes	%	±%
Liberal Democrats	Sam Raby	462	41.5	+3.8
Conservative	Simon Torn	335	30.1	−10.7
Green	Claire Adcock	222	19.9	+19.9
Labour	Daniel Everett	95	8.5	−8.9
Majority		127	11.4	
Turnout		1,120	22.8	
Registered electors		4,912		
Liberal Democrats gain from Conservative		Swing		

==== Denne ====
The by-election was held following the resignation of Liberal Democrat councillor Frances Haigh, who had led the opposition Liberal Democrat group until August 2021. The seat was held for the Liberal Democrats by Clive Trott.

Denne: 24 March 2022
Party	Candidate	Votes	%	±%
Liberal Democrats	Clive Trott	832	46.02	−4.9
Conservative	David Walbank	628	34.7	0.3
Labour	Kevin O'Sullivan	241	13.3	−1.2
Green	David Yeates	107	5.9	5.9
Majority		204	11.3	
Turnout		1,814	24.2	
Registered electors		7,506		
Liberal Democrats hold				

==== Storrington & Washington ====
The by-election was held following the resignation of veteran Conservative councillor Jim Sanson after his deselection; the seat, traditionally safe for the Conservatives, was won by the Green Party.

Storrington & Washington: 7 April 2022
Party	Candidate	Votes	%	±%
Green	Joan Grech	1,281	47.8	+47.8
Conservative	Daniel Hall	943	35.2	−26.3
Liberal Democrats	Pascal Roberts	453	16.9	−16.9
Majority		338	12.6	N/A
Turnout		2,681	35.5	
Registered electors		7,559		
Green gain from Conservative		Swing		
