= 2023 Horsham District Council election =

English council election

- 4 May 2023

All 48 seats to Horsham District Council 25 seats needed for a majority

| | First party | Second party |
|---|---|---|
| Leader | Martin Boffey | Claire Vickers |
| Party | Liberal Democrats | Conservative |
| Last election | 13 seats, 28.3% | 32 seats, 48.5% |
| Seats won | 28 | 11 |
| Seat change | ▲15 | ▼21 |
| Popular vote | 32,756 | 31,217 |
| Percentage | 35.5% | 33.8% |
| Swing | ▲7.2 pp | ▼14.7 pp |
| | Third party | Fourth party |
| Party | Green | Independent |
| Last election | 2 seats, 3.6% | 1 seat, 1.4% |
| Seats won | 8 | 1 |
| Seat change | ▲6 | Steady |
| Popular vote | 18,506 | 622 |
| Percentage | 20.0% | 0.7% |
| Swing | ▲16.4 pp | ▼0.7 pp |
- Winner of each seat at the 2023 Horsham District Council election
Leader before election
Claire Vickers
Conservative
Leader after election
Martin Boffey
Liberal Democrats

The 2023 Horsham District Council election took place on 4 May 2023 to elect members of Horsham District Council in West Sussex, England. It was held on the same day as other local elections in England.

The Liberal Democrats gained control of the council from the Conservatives with an 8-seat majority. It was the first time since the 1995 election that the Liberal Democrats had taken control of the council. It was also the worst performance in terms of seats for the Conservative Party in any previous election to the council. The Conservative leader of the council prior to the election, Claire Vickers, lost her seat. Liberal Democrat group leader Martin Boffey was formally appointed the new leader of the council at the subsequent annual council meeting on 24 May 2023.

== Council Composition ==
Prior to the election, the composition of the council was:

↓
| 29 | 13 | 3 | 3 |
| Con | LDem | Grn | Ind |

After the election, the composition of the council was:

↓
| 28 | 11 | 8 | 1 |
| LDem | Con | Grn | Ind |

== Results summary ==
2023 Horsham District Council election
| Party | Candidates | Seats | Gains | Losses | Net gain/loss | Seats % | Votes % | Votes | +/− |
|---|---|---|---|---|---|---|---|---|---|
| Liberal Democrats | 48 | 28 | 15 | 0 | ▲15 | 58.3 | 35.5 | 32,756 | +7.2 |
| Conservative | 46 | 11 | 0 | 21 | ▼21 | 22.9 | 33.8 | 31,217 | –14.7 |
| Green | 47 | 8 | 6 | 0 | ▲6 | 16.7 | 20.0 | 18,506 | +16.4 |
| Independent | 3 | 1 | 0 | 0 | Steady | 2.1 | 0.7 | 622 | –0.7 |
| Labour | 31 | 0 | 0 | 0 | Steady | 0.0 | 9.5 | 8,733 | –5.2 |
| Reform | 2 | 0 | 0 | 0 | Steady | 0.0 | 0.3 | 290 | N/A |
| Peace | 1 | 0 | 0 | 0 | Steady | 0.0 | 0.2 | 143 | –0.2 |
| Heritage | 1 | 0 | 0 | 0 | Steady | 0.0 | 0.1 | 61 | N/A |

== Ward results ==
=== Billingshurst ===
Billingshurst (3 seats)
| Party | Candidate | Votes | % | ±% |
|---|---|---|---|---|
| Liberal Democrats | Samantha Bateman | 1,069 | 40.0 | +10.3 |
| Liberal Democrats | Mark Baynham | 1,044 | 39.1 | N/A |
| Liberal Democrats | John Trollope | 926 | 34.7 | −1.2 |
| Conservative | Christopher Brown | 871 | 32.6 | −16.8 |
| Conservative | Danijela David | 807 | 30.2 | −8.5 |
| Conservative | Nigel Jupp | 802 | 30.0 | −16.9 |
| Labour | Jonathan Austin | 582 | 21.8 | +5.6 |
| Labour | Chris Henson | 579 | 21.7 | +7.1 |
| Labour | Trishna Julha | 532 | 19.9 | +8.3 |
| Green | Jonathan Denton | 186 | 7.0 | N/A |
| Green | Nikki Nama | 180 | 6.7 | N/A |
| Green | Thomas Wilson | 128 | 4.8 | N/A |
| Turnout | | 2,688 | 33.43 | |
| Liberal Democrats gain from Conservative | | | | |
| Liberal Democrats gain from Conservative | | | | |
| Liberal Democrats gain from Conservative | | | | |

- Nigel Jupp is also an elected councillor at West Sussex County Council representing Southwater & Nuthurst.

=== Bramber, Upper Beeding & Woodmancote ===
Bramber, Upper Beeding & Woodmancote (2 seats)
| Party | Candidate | Votes | % | ±% |
|---|---|---|---|---|
| Green | Mike Croker | 940 | 57.7 | +10.9 |
| Conservative | Roger Noel | 800 | 49.1 | +6.7 |
| Liberal Democrats | Richard Allen | 577 | 35.4 | N/A |
| Liberal Democrats | Andy Mantell | 148 | 9.1 | N/A |
| Turnout | | 1,641 | 38.54 | |
| Green hold | | | | |
| Conservative hold | | | | |

- This was the only seat at the elections where the Green Party did not stand a full quota of candidates.

=== Broadbridge Heath ===
Broadbridge Heath (2 seats)
| Party | Candidate | Votes | % | ±% |
|---|---|---|---|---|
| Liberal Democrats | James Brookes | 579 | 44.7 | −15.3 |
| Liberal Democrats | Jonathan Taylor | 503 | 38.9 | −12.1 |
| Conservative | Aaron Courteney-Smith | 332 | 25.7 | −5.9 |
| Conservative | Khobi Vallis | 322 | 24.9 | −2.0 |
| Independent | Terry Oliver | 252 | 19.5 | N/A |
| Labour | Jane McGillivray | 160 | 12.4 | +1.3 |
| Green | Sheila Humphreys | 126 | 9.7 | N/A |
| Green | Sandra Vallens | 97 | 7.5 | N/A |
| Turnout | | 1,299 | 29.52 | |
| Liberal Democrats hold | | | | |
| Liberal Democrats hold | | | | |

=== Colgate & Rusper ===
Colgate & Rusper (2 seats)
| Party | Candidate | Votes | % | ±% |
|---|---|---|---|---|
| Conservative | Liz Kitchen | 681 | 48.0 | −25.9 |
| Conservative | Tony Hogben | 639 | 45.1 | −21.7 |
| Liberal Democrats | Joel Dinis | 485 | 34.2 | N/A |
| Liberal Democrats | Simon James | 297 | 20.9 | N/A |
| Labour | Donald Mahon | 221 | 15.6 | −5.9 |
| Green | Freya Finnegan | 198 | 14.0 | N/A |
| Green | Yelena Finnegan | 124 | 8.7 | N/A |
| Turnout | | 1,429 | 29.31 | |
| Conservative hold | | | | |
| Conservative hold | | | | |

- Liz Kitchen was Leader of the council from 2001 to 2009.

=== Cowfold, Shermanbury & West Grinstead ===
Cowfold, Shermanbury & West Grinstead (2 seats)
| Party | Candidate | Votes | % | ±% |
|---|---|---|---|---|
| Conservative | Lynn Lambert | 690 | 41.5 | −27.6 |
| Liberal Democrats | Joanne Knowles | 669 | 40.2 | N/A |
| Liberal Democrats | Paul Dittmer | 645 | 38.8 | N/A |
| Conservative | Sarah Payne | 633 | 38.0 | −30.6 |
| Green | Catherine Briggs | 193 | 11.6 | N/A |
| Labour | David Shone | 152 | 9.1 | −18.5 |
| Green | Amalia Finnegan | 148 | 8.9 | N/A |
| Turnout | | 1,673 | 37.76 | |
| Conservative hold | | | | |
| Liberal Democrats gain from Conservative | | | | |

=== Denne ===
Denne (3 seats)
| Party | Candidate | Votes | % | ±% |
|---|---|---|---|---|
| Liberal Democrats | Ruth Fletcher | 1,337 | 51.2 | −0.3 |
| Liberal Democrats | John Milne | 1,204 | 46.1 | −2.7 |
| Liberal Democrats | Clive Trott | 1,153 | 44.2 | −4.4 |
| Conservative | Ross Dye | 790 | 30.3 | −3.6 |
| Conservative | David Walbank | 780 | 29.9 | −4.9 |
| Conservative | Kimberley Williams | 752 | 28.8 | −2.4 |
| Labour | Hilary Key | 327 | 12.5 | −2.2 |
| Labour | Kevin O'Sullivan | 287 | 11.0 | −0.2 |
| Labour | Matthew Verrall | 253 | 9.7 | −2.8 |
| Green | Jane Sharp | 237 | 9.1 | N/A |
| Green | Vicci Johnson | 219 | 8.4 | N/A |
| Green | Robin Johnson | 210 | 8.0 | N/A |
| Turnout | | 2,620 | 34.45 | |
| Liberal Democrats hold | | | | |
| Liberal Democrats hold | | | | |
| Liberal Democrats hold | | | | |

- John Milne represented Roffey North ward from 2019 to 2023. He is also an elected councillor at West Sussex County Council representing Horsham Riverside.

=== Forest ===
Forest (3 seats)
| Party | Candidate | Votes | % | ±% |
|---|---|---|---|---|
| Liberal Democrats | David Skipp | 1,382 | 51.0 | +6.4 |
| Liberal Democrats | Colin Minto | 1,362 | 50.3 | +12.0 |
| Liberal Democrats | Jon Olson | 1,316 | 48.6 | +6.7 |
| Labour | Carol Hayton | 695 | 25.7 | +0.3 |
| Labour | David Hide | 662 | 24.4 | −0.2 |
| Labour | Gerard Kavanagh | 560 | 20.7 | −0.3 |
| Conservative | Michael Revell | 385 | 14.2 | −5.2 |
| Conservative | Ken Eglinton | 379 | 14.0 | −10.1 |
| Conservative | Julian Walden | 361 | 13.3 | −8.0 |
| Green | Hannah Moor | 220 | 8.1 | N/A |
| Green | Tony Baker | 200 | 7.4 | N/A |
| Green | Lawrence Leather | 148 | 5.5 | N/A |
| Peace | James Duggan | 143 | 5.3 | −5.4 |
| Turnout | | 2,711 | 39.54 | |
| Liberal Democrats hold | | | | |
| Liberal Democrats hold | | | | |
| Liberal Democrats hold | | | | |

=== Henfield ===
Henfield (2 seats)
| Party | Candidate | Votes | % | ±% |
|---|---|---|---|---|
| Independent | Malcolm Eastwood | 766 | 40.3 | N/A |
| Conservative | Josh Potts* | 753 | 39.6 | +6.2 |
| Green | Gill Perry | 742 | 39.0 | +10.1 |
| Labour | Fiona Ayres | 590 | 31.0 | +3.6 |
| Green | Sian Fisher | 267 | 14.0 | N/A |
| Liberal Democrats | Jonathan Dane | 193 | 10.1 | N/A |
| Liberal Democrats | Robert Mohamed | 83 | 4.4 | N/A |
| Turnout | | 1,905 | 41.45 | |
| Independent gain from Independent | | | | |
| Conservative hold | | | | |

=== Holbrook East ===
Holbrook East (2 seats)
| Party | Candidate | Votes | % | ±% |
|---|---|---|---|---|
| Liberal Democrats | Nick Grant | 874 | 47.3 | +7.8 |
| Liberal Democrats | Warwick Hellawell | 784 | 42.4 | N/A |
| Conservative | Karen Burgess* | 640 | 34.6 | −12.8 |
| Conservative | Simon Torn | 566 | 30.6 | −21.8 |
| Labour | Sheila Chapman | 186 | 10.1 | −9.8 |
| Labour | Lorraine Barry | 172 | 9.3 | −10.1 |
| Green | Florian Yeates | 150 | 8.1 | N/A |
| Green | Mark Francis | 125 | 6.8 | N/A |
| Reform | Tony Rickett | 82 | 4.4 | N/A |
| Turnout | | 1,855 | 40.61 | |
| Liberal Democrats gain from Conservative | | | | |
| Liberal Democrats gain from Conservative | | | | |

- Simon Torn represented Roffey South ward from 2011 to 2019.

=== Holbrook West ===
Holbrook West (2 seats)
| Party | Candidate | Votes | % | ±% |
|---|---|---|---|---|
| Liberal Democrats | Nigel Emery | 1,039 | 50.6 | +15.4 |
| Liberal Democrats | Chris Franke | 913 | 44.5 | +12.4 |
| Conservative | Peter Burgess* | 750 | 36.5 | −12.4 |
| Conservative | Christian Mitchell* | 732 | 35.7 | −11.9 |
| Labour | Raymond Chapman | 192 | 9.4 | −3.6 |
| Green | David Hall | 148 | 7.2 | N/A |
| Green | Una McCartan | 133 | 6.5 | N/A |
| Labour | Ros Shiel | 112 | 5.5 | −9.9 |
| Turnout | | 2,059 | 41.13 | |
| Liberal Democrats gain from Conservative | | | | |
| Liberal Democrats gain from Conservative | | | | |

- Christian Mitchell is also an elected councillor at West Sussex County Council representing Broadbridge.

=== Itchingfield, Slinfold & Warnham ===
Itchingfield, Slinfold & Warnham (2 seats)
| Party | Candidate | Votes | % | ±% |
|---|---|---|---|---|
| Liberal Democrats | Kasia Greenwood | 740 | 44.2 | +12.2 |
| Conservative | Tricia Youtan* | 683 | 40.8 | −7.6 |
| Conservative | Robert Nye | 667 | 39.9 | −6.9 |
| Liberal Democrats | Brian Tweedy | 597 | 35.7 | +6.8 |
| Green | Jennie Tomlinson | 185 | 11.1 | N/A |
| Green | Andrew Finnegan | 145 | 8.7 | N/A |
| Labour | Araminta Barlow | 134 | 8.0 | +0.4 |
| Turnout | | 1,687 | 37.83 | |
| Liberal Democrats gain from Conservative | | | | |
| Conservative hold | | | | |

- Robert Nye sat on Horsham District Council in various wards from 1999 to 2011. He was leader of the council from 2009 to 2011.

=== Nuthurst & Lower Beeding ===
Nuthurst & Lower Beeding
| Party | Candidate | Votes | % | ±% |
|---|---|---|---|---|
| Liberal Democrats | Dennis Livingstone | 464 | 44.6 | +9.6 |
| Conservative | Norman Bryant | 397 | 38.2 | −20.1 |
| Labour | Hazel Lamb | 94 | 9.0 | +2.3 |
| Green | Natasha Barnes | 85 | 8.2 | N/A |
| Turnout | | 1,044 | 42.68 | |
| Liberal Democrats gain from Conservative | | Swing | | |

=== Pulborough, Coldwaltham & Amberley ===
Pulborough, Coldwaltham & Amberley (3 seats)
| Party | Candidate | Votes | % | ±% |
|---|---|---|---|---|
| Green | Jon Campbell | 868 | 41.0 | +3.6 |
| Green | Len Ellis-Brown | 862 | 40.7 | N/A |
| Conservative | Paul Clarke* | 813 | 38.4 | −10.6 |
| Conservative | Richard Atkins | 777 | 36.7 | −11.5 |
| Green | Morag Warrack | 623 | 29.4 | N/A |
| Conservative | Damian Stuart | 566 | 26.7 | −18.8 |
| Liberal Democrats | Jane Berry | 341 | 16.1 | N/A |
| Labour | Jane Mote | 326 | 15.4 | −8.2 |
| Liberal Democrats | Chris Geeson | 269 | 12.7 | N/A |
| Reform | John Wallace | 208 | 9.8 | −11.5 |
| Liberal Democrats | John Evans | 167 | 7.9 | N/A |
| Heritage | Johanna Hughes | 61 | 2.9 | N/A |
| Turnout | | 2,124 | 35.79 | |
| Green gain from Conservative | | | | |
| Green gain from Conservative | | | | |
| Conservative hold | | | | |

- Paul Clarke was Leader of the council for 207 days in 2021 before resigning.

=== Roffey North ===
Roffey North (2 seats)
| Party | Candidate | Votes | % | ±% |
|---|---|---|---|---|
| Liberal Democrats | Tony Bevis* | 845 | 51.2 | +2.5 |
| Liberal Democrats | Belinda Walters | 771 | 46.7 | +1.6 |
| Conservative | Jonathan Dancer | 480 | 29.1 | −10.5 |
| Conservative | Tracey Grabowski | 431 | 26.1 | −7.2 |
| Labour | Daniel Everett | 218 | 13.2 | −1.5 |
| Labour | Kyle Wickens | 201 | 12.2 | +0.3 |
| Green | Ian Nicol | 146 | 8.8 | −5.9 |
| Green | Nicholas Linfield | 125 | 7.6 | N/A |
| Turnout | | 1,661 | 34.57 | |
| Liberal Democrats hold | | | | |
| Liberal Democrats hold | | | | |

- Belinda Walters represented Denne ward from 2019 to 2023.
- Jonathan Dancer represented Roffey North ward from 2015 to 2019.

=== Roffey South ===
Roffey South (2 seats)
| Party | Candidate | Votes | % | ±% |
|---|---|---|---|---|
| Liberal Democrats | Sam Raby* | 746 | 48.6 | +8.4 |
| Liberal Democrats | Jay Mercer | 715 | 46.6 | +8.9 |
| Conservative | Alan Britten* | 448 | 29.2 | −11.0 |
| Conservative | Katie Nagel | 418 | 27.2 | −13.6 |
| Green | Claire Adcock | 175 | 11.4 | N/A |
| Labour | Nicola Gardner | 171 | 11.1 | −6.3 |
| Labour | Sara Loewenthal | 170 | 11.1 | −5.3 |
| Green | Tony Cook | 105 | 6.8 | N/A |
| Turnout | | 1,545 | 31.42 | |
| Liberal Democrats gain from Conservative | | | | |
| Liberal Democrats hold | | | | |

- Alan Britten represented Roffey South as a Liberal Democrat from 2019 to 2023. He previously sat as a Conservative from 2015 to 2019 before defecting to the Liberal Democrats ahead of the 2019 election. He rejoined the Conservatives in 2023.
- Katie Nagel is also an elected councillor at West Sussex County Council representing St Leonard's Forest.

=== Rudgwick ===
Rudgwick
| Party | Candidate | Votes | % | ±% |
|---|---|---|---|---|
| Conservative | Dick Landeryou* | 497 | 55.5 | −14.1 |
| Liberal Democrats | Patrick Mason | 254 | 28.3 | +5.3 |
| Green | Harry Tilney | 79 | 8.8 | N/A |
| Labour | Rebecca Bainbridge | 66 | 7.4 | ±0.0 |
| Turnout | | 903 | 38.87 | |
| Conservative hold | | Swing | | |

=== Southwater North ===
Southwater North (2 seats)
| Party | Candidate | Votes | % | ±% |
|---|---|---|---|---|
| Liberal Democrats | Mike Wood | 732 | 43.6 | +8.1 |
| Liberal Democrats | Peter van der Borgh | 730 | 43.5 | +8.2 |
| Conservative | Claire Vickers* | 633 | 37.7 | −13.8 |
| Conservative | John Chidlow | 605 | 36.0 | −17.3 |
| Labour | Jill Clarke | 155 | 9.2 | −0.6 |
| Green | Nick Barnett | 151 | 9.0 | N/A |
| Green | Jill Shuker | 149 | 8.9 | N/A |
| Labour | Margaret Cornwell | 126 | 7.5 | +0.3 |
| Turnout | | 1,687 | 38.19 | |
| Liberal Democrats gain from Conservative | | | | |
| Liberal Democrats gain from Conservative | | | | |

- Claire Vickers was the Leader of the council until losing her seat.
- John Chidlow represented Southwater from 2011 to 2019.

=== Southwater South & Shipley ===
Southwater South & Shipley (2 seats)
| Party | Candidate | Votes | % | ±% |
|---|---|---|---|---|
| Liberal Democrats | Colette Blackburn | 889 | 50.5 | +12.5 |
| Liberal Democrats | Alex Jeffrey | 699 | 39.7 | +4.6 |
| Conservative | Ian Stannard* | 689 | 39.1 | −3.1 |
| Conservative | Matthew Payne | 686 | 38.9 | −5.7 |
| Labour | Diane Burstow | 173 | 9.8 | +0.7 |
| Green | Diana Croker | 155 | 8.8 | N/A |
| Green | Peter Shaw | 106 | 6.0 | N/A |
| Turnout | | 1,777 | 33.64 | |
| Liberal Democrats gain from Conservative | | | | |
| Liberal Democrats gain from Conservative | | | | |

- Ian Stannard was the vice-chair of the council until losing his seat.

=== Steyning & Ashurst ===
Steyning & Ashurst (2 seats)
| Party | Candidate | Votes | % | ±% |
|---|---|---|---|---|
| Green | Victoria Finnegan | 895 | 47.2 | +3.1 |
| Green | Nicholas Marks | 808 | 42.6 | N/A |
| Conservative | Tim Lloyd* | 690 | 36.4 | −6.6 |
| Conservative | Hattie Shoosmith | 576 | 30.4 | −5.6 |
| Liberal Democrats | Kevin Hammond | 344 | 18.2 | N/A |
| Liberal Democrats | Chris Howell | 344 | 18.2 | N/A |
| Turnout | | 1,911 | 40.31 | |
| Green hold | | | | |
| Green gain from Conservative | | | | |

=== Storrington & Washington ===
Storrington & Washington (3 seats)
| Party | Candidate | Votes | % | ±% |
|---|---|---|---|---|
| Green | Joan Grech* | 1,588 | 52.1 | N/A |
| Green | Emma Beard | 1,579 | 51.8 | N/A |
| Green | Claudia Fisher | 1,452 | 47.6 | N/A |
| Conservative | Daniel Hall | 1,206 | 39.5 | −22.0 |
| Conservative | Anthony Watts | 1,099 | 36.0 | −23.6 |
| Conservative | Gary Markwell | 903 | 29.6 | −26.3 |
| Liberal Democrats | Janine Milne | 411 | 13.5 | −23.0 |
| Liberal Democrats | Alex Beveridge | 294 | 9.6 | N/A |
| Liberal Democrats | Thomas Worth | 264 | 8.7 | N/A |
| Turnout | | 3,075 | 41.07 | |
| Green gain from Conservative | | | | |
| Green gain from Conservative | | | | |
| Green gain from Conservative | | | | |

- Gary Markwell is also an elected councillor at West Sussex County Council representing Arundel & Courtwick. He also, simultaneously stood for election in Arun District Council where he was also defeated by The Green Party.

=== Trafalgar ===
Trafalgar (2 seats)
| Party | Candidate | Votes | % | ±% |
|---|---|---|---|---|
| Liberal Democrats | Martin Boffey* | 1,287 | 64.2 | +7.0 |
| Liberal Democrats | Tony Frankland | 1,212 | 60.4 | +7.2 |
| Conservative | Tim Nagel | 374 | 18.6 | −5.1 |
| Conservative | David Thompson | 364 | 18.1 | −3.1 |
| Labour | Joanne Kavanagh | 236 | 11.8 | −4.6 |
| Labour | Adam Key | 161 | 8.0 | −5.3 |
| Green | Wendy Breese | 141 | 7.0 | N/A |
| Green | Kim Hope | 138 | 6.9 | N/A |
| Turnout | | 2,011 | 42.04 | |
| Liberal Democrats hold | | | | |
| Liberal Democrats hold | | | | |

- Martin Boffey was, heading into the election Leader of the Opposition.

=== West Chiltington, Thakeham & Ashington ===
West Chiltington, Thakeham & Ashington (3 seats)
| Party | Candidate | Votes | % | ±% |
|---|---|---|---|---|
| Conservative | Philip Circus* | 1,369 | 46.2 | −10.6 |
| Conservative | Alan Manton | 1,262 | 42.6 | −15.6 |
| Conservative | Joy Dennis | 1,119 | 37.8 | −10.0 |
| Green | Jenny Altamirano Smith | 1,046 | 35.3 | N/A |
| Green | Barry Humphreys | 981 | 33.1 | N/A |
| Green | Ana Sivers | 800 | 27.0 | N/A |
| Liberal Democrats | Ian Miles | 533 | 18.0 | −12.1 |
| Independent | Caroline Instance | 370 | 12.5 | N/A |
| Liberal Democrats | Rob Phillips | 288 | 9.7 | N/A |
| Labour | Nick Dalton | 240 | 8.1 | −7.6 |
| Liberal Democrats | Evan Stone | 238 | 8.0 | N/A |
| Turnout | | 2,974 | 42.10 | |
| Conservative hold | | | | |
| Conservative hold | | | | |
| Conservative hold | | | | |

- Philip Circus was Deputy Leader of the council.
- Joy Dennis is also an elected councillor at West Sussex County Council representing Hurstpierpoint & Bolney.

== Changes 2023-2027 ==
The council has held five by-elections during this term (see By-elections below). In addition, two councillors changed party affiliation without a seat being contested:

- 3 August 2025: Alan Manton (West Chiltington, Thakeham & Ashington) left the Conservatives to sit as an independent, saying "recent events have made it clear to me that our paths have diverged" and that he now had "more flexibility to advocate without Party Whip and constraints."
- 23 September 2025: Tony Hogben (Colgate & Rusper) left the Conservatives to sit as an independent.
- 15 January 2026: Hogben joined Reform UK, becoming the party's first councillor on Horsham District Council, saying "after spending 10 years serving Horsham DC for the Conservative Party, it is clear to me that they are no longer a credible force."
- 30 June 2026: Manton rejoined the Conservatives.

=== By-elections ===
==== Henfield ====
Henfield: 29 February 2024
| Party | Candidate | Votes | % | ±% |
|---|---|---|---|---|
| Green | Gill Perry | 668 | 44.2 | +5.3 |
| Conservative | Tim Lloyd | 569 | 37.7 | −1.9 |
| Labour | Fiona Ayres | 215 | 14.2 | −16.7 |
| Liberal Democrats | Nico Kearns | 59 | 3.9 | −3.3 |
| Majority | | 99 | 6.5 | |
| Turnout | | 1,514 | 33.3 | |
| Registered electors | | 4,544 | | |
| Green gain from Independent | | Swing | | |

The by-election was held following the death of independent councillor Malcolm Eastwood in December 2023.

==== Southwater North ====
Southwater North: 29 February 2024
| Party | Candidate | Votes | % | ±% |
|---|---|---|---|---|
| Conservative | Claire Vickers | 618 | 49.0 | +11.2 |
| Liberal Democrats | Gary Hayes | 388 | 30.8 | −13.0 |
| Green | Jennifer Nuin Smith | 162 | 12.9 | +3.8 |
| Labour | Minty Barlow | 92 | 7.3 | −2.0 |
| Majority | | 230 | 18.2 | |
| Turnout | | 1,267 | 28.8 | |
| Registered electors | | 4,397 | | |
| Conservative gain from Liberal Democrats | | Swing | | |

The by-election was held after Liberal Democrat councillor Mike Wood resigned due to a change in his professional circumstances.

==== Denne ====
Denne: 21 November 2024
| Party | Candidate | Votes | % | ±% |
|---|---|---|---|---|
| Conservative | Cheryl Sweeney | 712 | 38.6 | +9.2 |
| Liberal Democrats | Ben Hewson | 672 | 36.4 | –13.3 |
| Green | Jennifer Nuin Smith | 255 | 13.8 | +5.0 |
| Labour | Cameron McGilliray | 205 | 11.1 | –1.1 |
| Majority | | 40 | 2.2 | N/A |
| Turnout | | 1,848 | 23.1 | –11.4 |
| Registered electors | | 7,987 | | |
| Conservative gain from Liberal Democrats | | Swing | ▲11.3 | |

The by-election was held after Liberal Democrat councillor John Milne resigned from the council, saying the demands of the parliamentary schedule would make attendance at formal council meetings too difficult to maintain, following his election as MP for Horsham at the 2024 general election. Milne also held a West Sussex County Council seat for Horsham Riverside, which he resigned for the same reason ahead of the county's May 2025 election.

==== Colgate & Rusper ====
Colgate & Rusper: 17 April 2025
| Party | Candidate | Votes | % | ±% |
|---|---|---|---|---|
| Liberal Democrats | Hannah Butler | 453 | 30.3 | –0.3 |
| Conservative | Josh Bounds | 406 | 27.2 | –15.8 |
| Green | Andrew Finnegan | 375 | 25.1 | +12.6 |
| Reform | Robert Nye | 206 | 13.8 | N/A |
| Labour | Gerard Kavanagh | 53 | 3.5 | –10.4 |
| Majority | | 47 | 3.1 | N/A |
| Turnout | | 1,494 | 27.7 | –1.6 |
| Registered electors | | 5,389 | | |
| Liberal Democrats gain from Conservative | | Swing | ▲7.8 | |

The by-election was held following the death of Conservative councillor Liz Kitchen on 10 February 2025. Kitchen had represented Colgate and Rusper since 1987 and had served as council leader from 2001 to 2009.

==== Itchingfield, Slinfold & Warnham ====
Itchingfield, Slinfold & Warnham: 7 May 2026
| Party | Candidate | Votes | % | ±% |
|---|---|---|---|---|
| Conservative | Ross Dye | 773 | 31.7 | –9.1 |
| Liberal Democrats | Ed Skeates | 757 | 31.0 | –13.2 |
| Reform | Robert Nye | 662 | 27.1 | N/A |
| Green | Catherine Ross | 248 | 10.2 | −0.9 |
| Turnout | | 2,448 | 54.1 | +16.3 |
| Rejected ballots | | 8 | | |
| Registered electors | | 4,529 | | |
| Conservative gain from Liberal Democrats | | Swing | | |

The by-election was held following the resignation of Liberal Democrat councillor Kasia Greenwood.
