= John Milne (British politician) =

British politician

John Milne MP
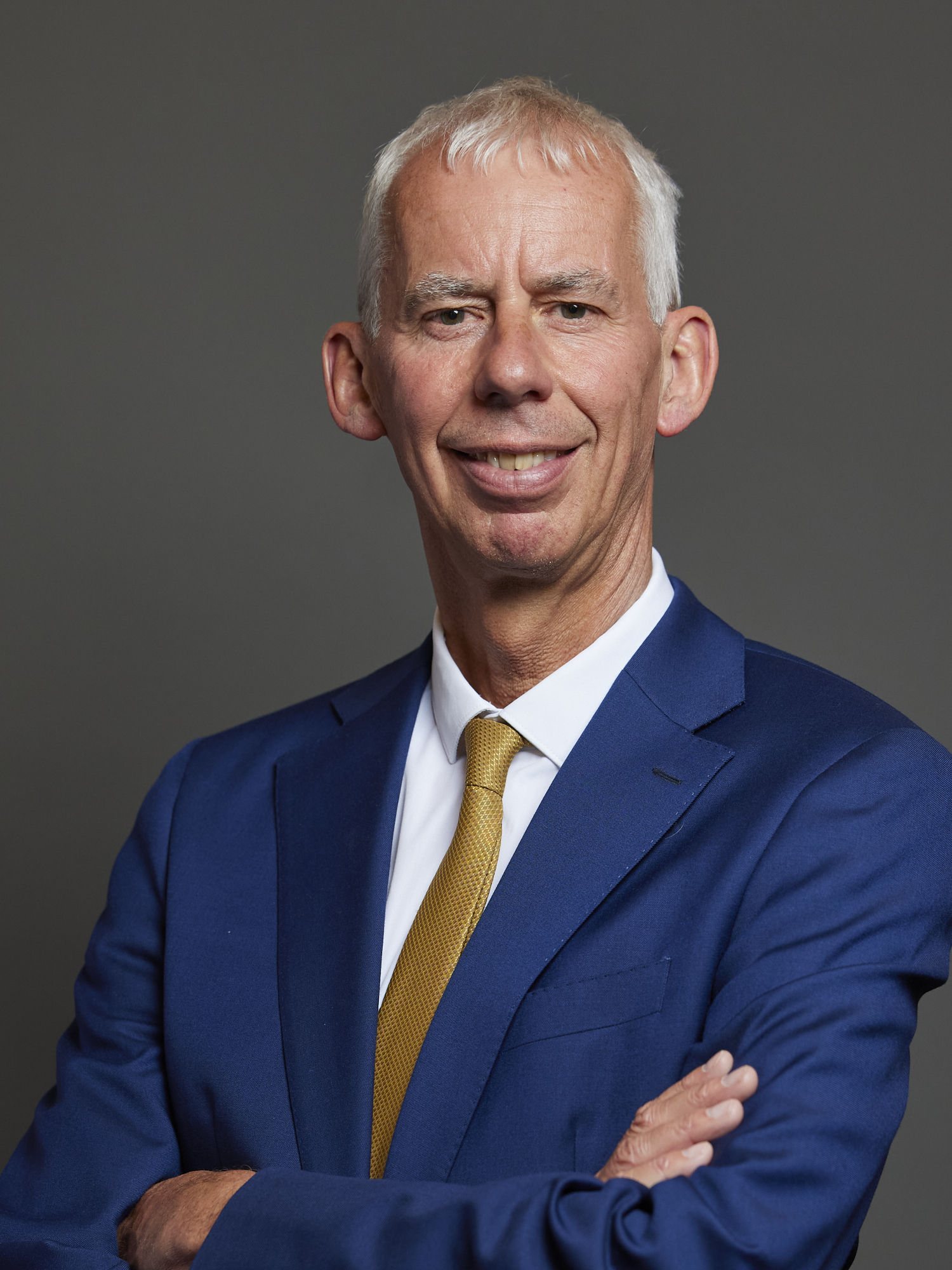
- Official portrait, 2024

Member of Parliament for Horsham
- Incumbent
- Assumed office 4 July 2024
- Preceded by: Jeremy Quin
- Majority: 2,517 (4.6%)

Member of West Sussex County Council for Horsham Riverside
- In office 10 May 2021 – 22 May 2025
- Preceded by: Morwen Millson
- Succeeded by: Louise Potter

Member of Horsham District Council for Denne Roffey North (2019–2023)
- In office 6 May 2019 – 11 October 2024

Personal details
- Born: John Laurence Milne; 2 January 1960 (age 66)
- Party: Liberal Democrats
- Education: University of Oxford (BA)

John Laurence Milne (born 2 January 1960) is a British Liberal Democrat politician who has been Member of Parliament (MP) for Horsham since 2024. He has also served as a member of West Sussex County Council since 2021 and Horsham District Council since 2019.

== Early life and education ==
Milne grew up in Epsom and was educated at Glyn Grammar School. He was awarded a scholarship and studied at the University of Oxford, gaining a Bachelor of Arts (BA) degree in English literature.

Prior to entering politics, Milne worked as a creative director in advertising.

== Political career ==
Milne was elected as a member of Horsham District Council for Roffey North in the 2019 election, and for Denne in the 2023 election. He served as deputy leader of the district council until his election to Parliament in 2024. Milne has also represented the division of Horsham Riverside on West Sussex County Council since the 2021 election, and has served as a member of Forest Neighbourhood Council.

In the 2024 general election, Milne was elected as the MP for Horsham, defeating the incumbent Conservative MP, Jeremy Quin. Milne became the first non-Conservative MP to represent the constituency since James Clifton Brown, elected at the 1876 Horsham by-election.

== Parliamentary roles ==
Since his election, John Milne MP has been a member of the Work and Pensions Select Committee in the House of Commons.

In Parliament, Milne served on the Bill Committee for the Public Authorities (Fraud, Error and Recovery) Bill, tabling amendments aimed at providing greater accountability of the Department for Work and Pensions and preventing unfair punishment of vulnerable claimants.

In 2025, Milne was appointed as an officer of the All-Party Parliamentary Group (APPG) for Pensions and Growth, a cross-party initiative focused on addressing pension insecurity and exploring ways to unlock investment to support UK economic growth.

== Personal life ==
Milne lives in Horsham with his family.

Parliament of the United Kingdom
Preceded by Jeremy Quin	Member of Parliament for Horsham; 2024–present	Incumbent
