= Jeremy Quin =

British politician

The Right Honourable Sir Jeremy Quin
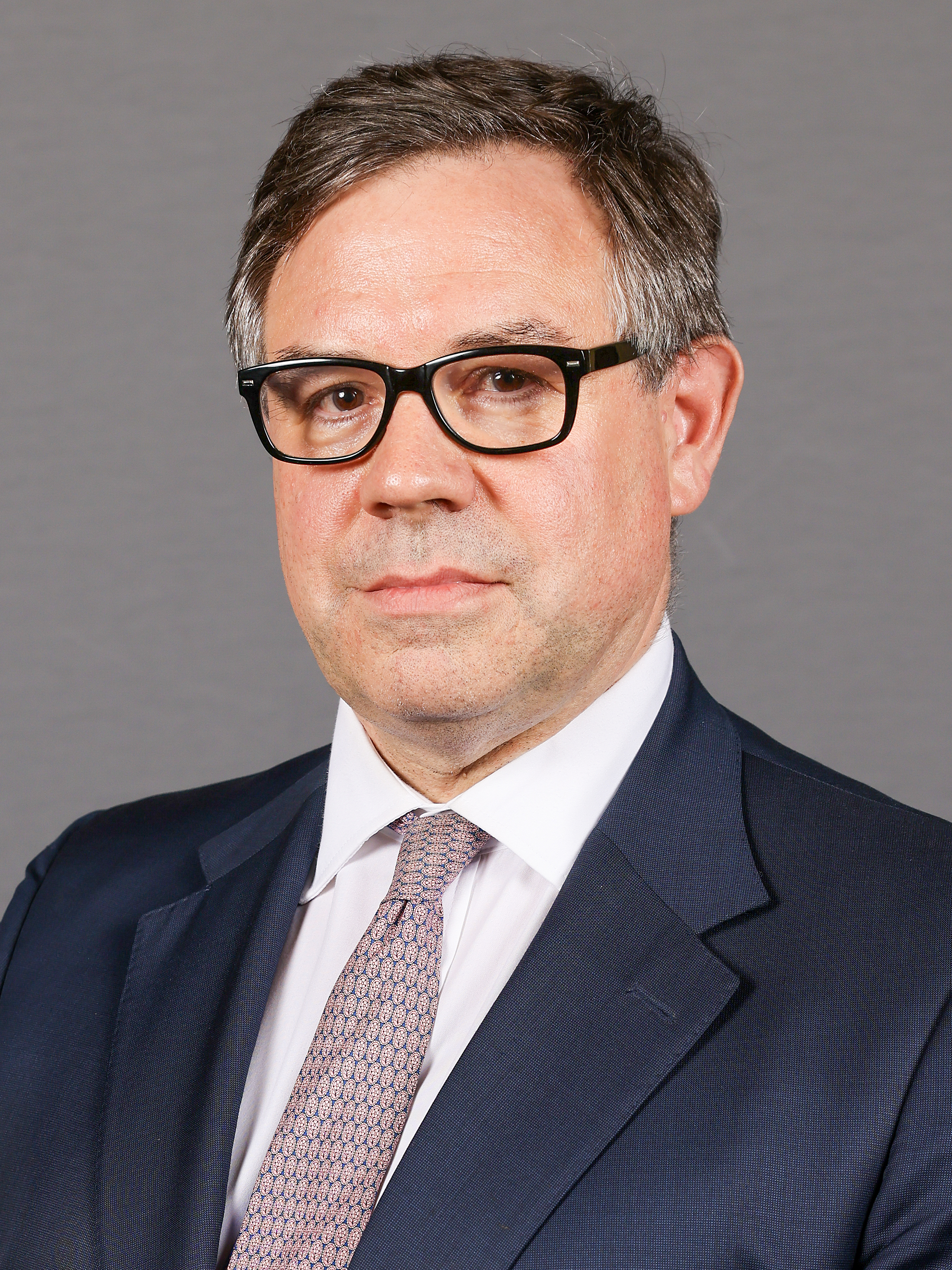
- Official portrait, 2022

Chair of the Defence Select Committee
- In office 17 January 2024 – 30 May 2024
- Preceded by: Robert Courts
- Succeeded by: Tan Dhesi

Minister for the Cabinet Office Paymaster General
- In office 25 October 2022 – 13 November 2023
- Prime Minister: Rishi Sunak
- Preceded by: Chris Philp
- Succeeded by: John Glen

Minister of State for Crime, Policing and Fire
- In office 7 September 2022 – 25 October 2022
- Prime Minister: Liz Truss
- Preceded by: Tom Pursglove
- Succeeded by: Chris Philp

Minister of State for Defence Procurement
- In office 13 February 2020 – 7 September 2022
- Prime Minister: Boris Johnson
- Preceded by: James Heappey
- Succeeded by: Alec Shelbrooke

Parliamentary Secretary for the Cabinet Office
- In office 16 December 2019 – 13 February 2020
- Prime Minister: Boris Johnson
- Preceded by: Simon Hart
- Succeeded by: Julia Lopez

Comptroller of the Household
- In office 28 July 2019 – 16 December 2019
- Prime Minister: Boris Johnson
- Preceded by: Mark Spencer
- Succeeded by: Mike Freer

Lord Commissioner of the Treasury
- In office 5 November 2018 – 24 July 2019
- Prime Minister: Theresa May
- Preceded by: Nigel Adams
- Succeeded by: Michelle Donelan

Member of Parliament for Horsham
- In office 7 May 2015 – 30 May 2024
- Preceded by: Francis Maude
- Succeeded by: John Milne

Personal details
- Born: 24 September 1968 (age 57) Aylesbury, England
- Party: Conservative
- Education: Hertford College, Oxford

Sir Jeremy Mark Quin (born 24 September 1968) is a British Conservative politician who served as the Member of Parliament (MP) for Horsham from 2015 to 2024. He served as Minister of State for Defence Procurement from February 2020 to September 2022 before briefly serving as Minister of State for Crime, Policing and Fire, during which time he oversaw security arrangements for Queen Elizabeth II's funeral.

Following this, Rishi Sunak appointed him to be Paymaster General and Minister for the Cabinet Office. Quin resigned from Sunak's government in the November 2023 British cabinet reshuffle and was knighted in the 2023 Political Honours for public and political service. He became Chair of the Defence Select Committee in January 2024. Quin lost his seat in the 2024 general election and was later that year appointed as a team member for the externally led Strategic Defence Review ordered by Keir Starmer.

== Early life and career ==
Jeremy Quin was born on 24 September 1968 in Aylesbury. He was educated at St Albans School, before studying at Hertford College, Oxford. Whilst at Oxford he served as President of the Oxford Union; John Evelyn, the Cherwell gossip columnist, described Quin's "Great Life Plan" as "Oxford, Union presidency, merchant banking, safe Tory seat".

After graduating from Oxford University, he joined NatWest Securities, which later merged into Deutsche Bank; in 2001, Quin became a Managing Director of the firm. In 2008 and 2009, he served on secondment as Senior Corporate Financial Adviser to HM Treasury advising on the government's response to the 2008 financial crisis.

== Political career ==
=== Local government career ===
Quin stood as the Conservative candidate in Meirionnydd Nant Conwy at the 1997 general election, coming third with 16% of the vote behind the incumbent Plaid Cymru MP Elfyn Llwyd and the Labour candidate.

From 2010 to 2013, he served as the chairman of Buckingham Conservative Association.

=== Parliamentary career ===
At the 2015 general election, Quin was elected to Parliament as MP for Horsham with 57.3% of the vote and a majority of 24,658.

In July 2015, he was elected as a member of the Work and Pensions Select Committee, and held this position until October 2016. Quin also served on the Regulatory Reform Select Committee between October 2015 and November 2018,

Quin was re-elected as MP for Horsham at the snap 2017 general election with an increased vote share of 59.5% and a decreased majority of 23,484.

Under Theresa May, Quin was appointed a Lord Commissioner of the Treasury. On 28 July 2019 he was promoted to Comptroller of the Household by Boris Johnson.

Quin was again re-elected at the 2019 general election, with a decreased vote share of 56.8% and a decreased majority of 21,127.

=== Ministerial career ===
Following the election, Jeremy became Parliamentary Secretary in the Cabinet Office with responsibilities for the Government Commercial Function and other cross-government programmes.

In February 2020, Quin was appointed as Minister of State for Defence Procurement in the Ministry of Defence.

In September 2022, Quin was appointed Minister of State for Crime, Policing and Fire in the Home Office.

In October 2022, Quin was appointed Paymaster General and Minister for the Cabinet Office. While in the role he oversaw the introduction of the Procurement Act.

On 27 October 2022, Quin was appointed to the Privy Council.

=== Return to the backbenches ===
In November 2023, Quin resigned from government to focus on projects in his constituency.

Quin was knighted in the 2023 Political Honours for public and political service.

Quin was elected Chair of the Defence Select Committee on 17 January 2024. The Committee published its report, "Ready for War?" on 4 February 2024.

At the 2024 general election, held on 4 July, Quin lost his seat to the Liberal Democrats candidate, John Milne. As a result, Quin became the first incumbent MP for Horsham to fail to gain re-election for the constituency since James Clifton Brown in 1880.

== Post-political career ==
In September 2024, Quin was appointed as a team member for the externally led Strategic Defence Review ordered by Keir Starmer.

On 21 November 2025, Quin was employed as president of Boeing UK & Ireland.

Parliament of the United Kingdom
Preceded by Francis Maude	Member of Parliament for Horsham; 2015–2024	Succeeded by John Milne
Political offices
Preceded by Nigel Adams	Lord Commissioner of the Treasury; 2018–2019	Succeeded by Michelle Donelan
Preceded by Mark Spencer	Comptroller of the Household; 2019	Succeeded by Mike Freer
Preceded by Simon Hart	Parliamentary Secretary for the Cabinet Office; 2019–2020	Succeeded by Julia Lopez
Preceded by James Heappey as Parliamentary Under-Secretary of State	Minister of State for Defence Procurement; 2020–2022	Succeeded by Alec Shelbrooke
Preceded by Chris Philp	Minister for the Cabinet Office; 2022–2023	Succeeded by John Glen
Preceded by Chris Philp	Paymaster General; 2022–2023	Succeeded by John Glen
