= 2021 West Sussex County Council election =

2021 UK local government election

- 6 May 2021

All 70 seats to West Sussex County Council 36 seats needed for a majority
	First party	Second party	Third party
Party	Conservative	Liberal Democrats	Labour
Last election	56	9	5
Seats won	48	10	9
Seat change	▼8	▲1	▲4
Popular vote	114,442	47,589	46,761
Percentage	46.8%	19.4%	19.1%
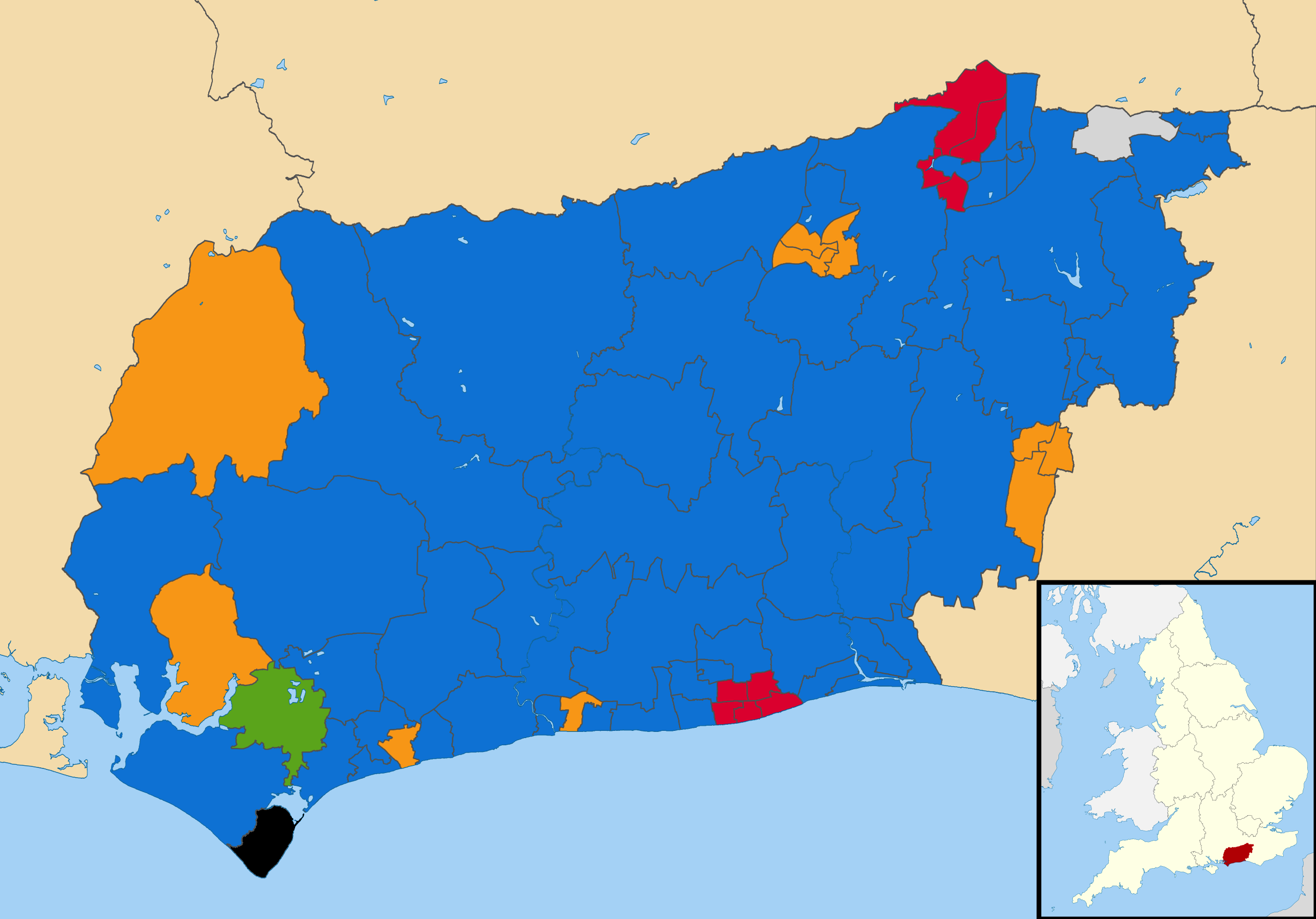
- Map showing the results of the 2021 West Sussex County Council election

The 2021 West Sussex County Council election took place on 6 May 2021 alongside other local elections. All 70 seats to West Sussex County Council were elected. Labour gained 4 seats in the Worthing division, while the Green Party and Local Alliance gained their first ever seats on the council.

== Summary ==
=== Election result ===
2021 West Sussex County Council election
Party	Candidates	Seats	Gains	Losses	Net gain/loss	Seats %	Votes %	Votes	+/−
Conservative	70	48	3	11	▼8	68.6	46.8	114,442	–4.6
Liberal Democrats	65	10	4	3	▲1	14.3	19.4	47,589	+0.3
Labour	67	9	5	1	▲4	12.9	19.1	46,761	+3.7
Green	56	1	1	0	▲1	1.4	10.3	25,101	+5.1
Independent	14	1	1	0	▲1	1.4	3.1	7,437	+0.7
Local Alliance	1	1	1	0	▲1	1.4	0.7	1,733	N/A
Reform	6	0	0	0	Steady	0.0	0.2	559	N/A
For Britain	8	0	0	0	Steady	0.0	0.2	558	N/A
Peace	1	0	0	0	Steady	0.0	0.1	208	+0.1
Monster Raving Loony	1	0	0	0	Steady	0.0	0.1	122	+0.1
RED	1	0	0	0	Steady	0.0	<0.1	90	N/A
Libertarian	1	0	0	0	Steady	0.0	<0.1	78	N/A
TUSC	1	0	0	0	Steady	0.0	<0.1	37	N/A
Patria	1	0	0	0	Steady	0.0	<0.1	32	±0.0

== Results by division ==
Results for each division at the 6 May 2021 election were as follows:

=== Adur ===
Lancing
Party	Candidate	Votes	%	±%
Conservative	Andy McGregor	1,632	48.8	+4.4
Labour	Lee Cowen	1,203	36.0	+18.4
Liberal Democrats	Doris Martin	264	7.9	−6.2
Green	Russell Whiting	243	7.3	+0.9
Majority		429	12.8	−14.0
Turnout		3,374	33.7	+2.3
Registered electors		10,006		
Conservative hold		Swing	▼7.0	

Shoreham North
Party	Candidate	Votes	%	±%
Conservative	Emma Evans	1,648	41.7	−9.6
Labour	Deborah Stainforth	1,482	37.5	+15.3
Liberal Democrats	Nico Kearns	460	11.6	+2.6
Green	Anne Younger	364	9.2	+1.2
Majority		166	4.2	−24.9
Turnout		4,025	39.8	+10.0
Registered electors		10,111		
Conservative hold		Swing	▼12.5	

Shoreham South
Party	Candidate	Votes	%	±%
Conservative	Kevin Boram	1,671	37.8	−8.5
Labour	Catherine Arnold	1,544	34.9	+9.9
Green	Leslie Groves-Williams	906	20.5	+9.5
Liberal Democrats	Neville Pressley	301	6.8	−3.7
Majority		127	2.9	−18.4
Turnout		4,458	46.9	+8.6
Registered electors		9,501		
Conservative hold		Swing	▼9.2	

Sompting and North Lancing
Party	Candidate	Votes	%	±%
Conservative	Carson Albury	2,009	58.9	+7.2
Labour	Cathy Glynn-Davies	745	21.8	+3.9
Green	Lynn Finnigan	301	8.8	+4.7
Liberal Democrats	Steve Male	290	8.5	−1.2
For Britain	Mike Glennon	66	1.9	N/A
Majority		1,264	37.1	+3.3
Turnout		3,450	33.9	+0.2
Registered electors		10,169		
Conservative hold		Swing	▼1.7	

Southwick
Party	Candidate	Votes	%	±%
Conservative	Angus Dunn	1,751	50.9	−0.7
Labour	Steve Gilbert	1,200	34.9	+6.1
Green	Patrick Ginnelly	258	7.5	+2.6
Liberal Democrats	Ian Jones	228	6.6	−0.9
Majority		551	16.0	−6.8
Turnout		3,480	37.6	+2.1
Registered electors		9,266		
Conservative hold		Swing	▼3.4	

=== Arun ===
Angmering and Findon
Party	Candidate	Votes	%	±%
Conservative	Deborah Urquhart	1,596	55.7	−5.8
Liberal Democrats	Louisa Fowles	754	26.3	+8.1
Labour	Alison Baker	310	10.8	−2.7
Green	Chris Medland	207	7.2	N/A
Majority		842	29.4	
Turnout		2,888	31.7	
Registered electors		9,118		
Conservative hold		Swing		

Arundel and Courtwick
Party	Candidate	Votes	%	±%
Conservative	Gary Markwell	1,361	52.9	−3.4
Liberal Democrats	Nick Rusbridge	517	20.1	+6.7
Labour	Michael Ward	348	13.5	−3.6
Green	Richard Smith	346	13.5	+7.8
Majority		844	32.8	
Turnout		2,594	31.1	
Registered electors		8,352		
Conservative hold		Swing		

Bersted
Party	Candidate	Votes	%	±%
Conservative	Keir Greenway	1,040	37.7	+3.9
Independent	Paul Wells	676	24.5	N/A
Liberal Democrats	Gill Yeates	633	23.0	+3.3
Labour	Nigel Smith	409	14.8	+0.3
Majority		364	13.2	
Turnout		2,788	26.9	
Registered electors		10,366		
Conservative hold		Swing		

Bognor Regis East
Party	Candidate	Votes	%	±%
Liberal Democrats	Francis Oppler	689	31.7	−7.0
Conservative	Steve Reynolds	612	28.2	+2.3
Independent	Steve Goodheart	329	15.1	+6.4
Labour	Roger Nash	285	13.1	−1.2
Green	Chloe Wilkinson	136	6.3	+3.0
Independent	Phil Woodall	123	5.7	N/A
Majority		77	3.5	
Turnout		2,192	21.2	
Registered electors		10,362		
Liberal Democrats hold		Swing		

Bognor Regis West and Aldwick
Party	Candidate	Votes	%	±%
Conservative	Ashvin Patel	1,825	53.4	+5.5
Liberal Democrats	Matt Stanley	1,115	32.6	+2.2
Labour	Heather Robbins	479	14.0	+4.6
Majority		710	20.8	
Turnout		3,453	33.2	
Registered electors		10,397		
Conservative hold		Swing		

East Preston and Ferring
Party	Candidate	Votes	%	±%
Conservative	Roger Elkins	2,830	67.2	−4.8
Labour	Steve McConnell	437	10.4	−1.0
Liberal Democrats	John Richards	425	10.1	−0.2
Green	Elizabeth Hammond	380	9.0	N/A
For Britain	Karen Pearson	139	3.3	N/A
Majority		2,393	56.8	
Turnout		4,258	40.6	
Registered electors		10,496		
Conservative hold		Swing		

Felpham
Party	Candidate	Votes	%	±%
Conservative	John Charles	1,642	52.4	−12.5
Independent	Richard Parker	629	20.1	N/A
Liberal Democrats	Samantha-Jayne Staniforth	323	10.3	+2.2
Green	Rebecca Rowland	283	9.0	+5.3
Labour	Lynne Armstrong	256	8.2	−0.3
Majority		1,013	32.3	
Turnout		3,160	32.2	
Registered electors		9,802		
Conservative hold		Swing		

Fontwell
Party	Candidate	Votes	%	±%
Conservative	Trevor Bence	1,618	49.9	−13.8
Green	Paul Ayling	1,157	35.7	+25.5
Labour	Jane Mote	353	10.9	+2.6
For Britain	Jeannie Dunning	80	2.5	N/A
TUSC	Sarah Welch	37	1.1	N/A
Majority		461	14.2	
Turnout		3,267	32.0	
Registered electors		10,208		
Conservative hold		Swing		

Littlehampton East
Party	Candidate	Votes	%	±%
Liberal Democrats	James Walsh	1,575	46.6	+1.8
Conservative	Mike Clayden	1,283	38.0	−2.5
Labour	Freddie Tandy	318	9.4	−1.7
Green	Joseph Downie	203	6.0	+2.3
Majority		292	8.6	
Turnout		3,404	33.4	
Registered electors		10,200		
Liberal Democrats hold		Swing		

Littlehampton Town
Party	Candidate	Votes	%	±%
Conservative	David Britton	971	37.2	+5.1
Labour	Alan Butcher	677	26.0	+4.9
Liberal Democrats	William Tilbrook	452	17.3	−22.3
Independent	Ian Buckland	307	11.8	−27.8
Green	Lilias Cheyne	200	7.7	+2.8
Majority		294	11.3	
Turnout		2,641	25.7	
Registered electors		10,293		
Conservative gain from Liberal Democrats		Swing		

Middleton
Party	Candidate	Votes	%	±%
Conservative	Jacky Pendleton	1,799	55.4	−10.4
Liberal Democrats	Amanda Worne	1,024	31.5	+23.5
Green	Helen Pengelly	205	6.3	+1.2
Labour	Berni Millam	177	5.4	−3.2
For Britain	Tricia Wales	44	1.4	N/A
Majority		775	23.9	
Turnout		3,270	35.5	
Registered electors		9,203		
Conservative hold		Swing		

Nyetimber
Party	Candidate	Votes	%	±%
Conservative	Dawn Hall	1,489	44.5	−13.0
Independent	David Huntley	1,337	40.0	N/A
Green	Carol Birch	309	9.2	+3.1
Labour	David Meagher	211	6.3	−1.8
Majority		152	4.5	
Turnout		3,375	35.2	
Registered electors		9,580		
Conservative hold		Swing		

Rustington
Party	Candidate	Votes	%	±%
Conservative	Alison Cooper	2,629	64.6	+21.3
Liberal Democrats	Jamie Bennett	790	19.4	−26.6
Labour	Nigel Stapley	404	9.9	+4.4
Green	Faye Mackenzie	248	6.1	N/A
Majority		1,839	45.2	
Turnout		4,122	41.3	
Registered electors		9,975		
Conservative gain from Liberal Democrats		Swing		

=== Chichester ===
Bourne
Party	Candidate	Votes	%	±%
Conservative	Mike Magill	1,869	50.9	+10.7
Liberal Democrats	Andrew Kerry-Bedell	1,064	29.0	+9.5
Green	Ann Stewart	400	10.9	+4.0
Labour	Jane Towers	336	9.2	+1.4
Majority		805	21.9	
Turnout		3,694	36.5	
Registered electors		10,118		
Conservative hold		Swing		

Chichester East
Party	Candidate	Votes	%	±%
Conservative	Simon Oakley	1,292	49.9	+2.2
Liberal Democrats	David Betts	657	25.4	−3.6
Labour	Steve Gough	641	24.7	+9.9
Majority		635	24.5	
Turnout		2,625	28.2	
Registered electors		9,320		
Conservative hold		Swing		

Chichester North
Party	Candidate	Votes	%	±%
Conservative	Jeremy Hunt	2,035	51.7	−4.3
Liberal Democrats	Charlie Hastain	909	23.1	+1.6
Green	George Hibberd	497	12.6	+5.7
Labour	Sarah Lishman	497	12.6	+3.9
Majority		1,126	28.6	
Turnout		3,972	39.8	
Registered electors		9,979		
Conservative hold		Swing		

Chichester South
Party	Candidate	Votes	%	±%
Green	Sarah Sharp	2,183	57.3	+29.7
Conservative	Simon Lloyd-Williams	1,189	31.2	−16.5
Independent	Juliet Johnson	204	5.4	N/A
Independent	Adam Brown	179	4.7	N/A
Reform	Mark Crossman	55	1.4	N/A
Majority		994	26.1	
Turnout		3,843	38.4	
Registered electors		9,996		
Green gain from Conservative		Swing		

Chichester West
Party	Candidate	Votes	%	±%
Liberal Democrats	Julian Joy	1,417	35.3	+8.8
Conservative	Bob Hayes	1,414	35.3	−20.1
Independent	Gregory Fielder	727	18.1	N/A
Labour	James Hobson	420	10.5	+3.4
Patria	Andrew Emerson	32	0.8	+0.3
Majority		3	0.1	
Turnout		4,038	41.4	
Registered electors		9,747		
Liberal Democrats gain from Conservative		Swing		

Midhurst
Party	Candidate	Votes	%	±%
Liberal Democrats	Kate O'Kelly	2,123	57.1	+22.3
Conservative	Oliver Vickery	1,436	38.6	+5.2
Labour	Don Fraser	159	4.3	N/A
Majority		687	18.5	
Turnout		3,739	42.4	
Registered electors		8,812		
Liberal Democrats hold		Swing		

Petworth
Party	Candidate	Votes	%	±%
Conservative	Janet Duncton	2,335	66.8	−7.5
Liberal Democrats	Fred Lerche-Lerchenborg	514	14.7	−2.4
Green	Philip Maber	335	9.6	N/A
Labour	Jonathan Rodell	310	8.9	N/A
Majority		1,821	52.1	
Turnout		3,522	36.1	
Registered electors		9,756		
Conservative hold		Swing		

Rother Valley
Party	Candidate	Votes	%	±%
Conservative	Tom Richardson	2,105	61.7	−7.8
Green	Tim Young	651	19.1	N/A
Liberal Democrats	Jill Hilliard	408	12.0	−8.7
Labour	Juliette Reynolds	250	7.3	−2.5
Majority		1,454	42.6	
Turnout		3,448	39.5	
Registered electors		8,719		
Conservative hold		Swing		

Selsey
Party	Candidate	Votes	%	±%
Local Alliance	Donna Johnson	1,733	60.1	+32.8
Conservative	David Shakespeare	1,150	39.9	−11.5
Majority		583	20.2	
Turnout		2,926	33.5	
Registered electors		8,724		
Local Alliance gain from Conservative		Swing		

The Witterings
Party	Candidate	Votes	%	±%
Conservative	Pieter Montyn	2,187	65.0	−3.5
Green	Lucinda House	505	15.0	+10.3
Liberal Democrats	Sue Milnes	315	9.4	−1.0
Labour	Susan Walsh	309	9.2	+0.6
For Britain	Pat Hunt	48	1.4	−6.5
Majority		1,682	50.0	
Turnout		3,383	35.8	
Registered electors		9,439		
Conservative hold		Swing		

=== Crawley ===
Bewbush and Ifield West
Party	Candidate	Votes	%	±%
Labour	Chris Oxlade	1,348	47.3	+2.1
Conservative	Martin Stone	1,038	36.4	+1.4
Green	Richard Kail	365	12.8	+9.5
Liberal Democrats	Lawrence Mallinson	98	3.4	−1.9
Majority		310	10.9	
Turnout		3,149	34.6	
Registered electors		9,110		
Labour hold		Swing		

Broadfield
Party	Candidate	Votes	%	±%
Labour	Brian Quinn	1,539	52.5	−2.4
Conservative	Craig Burke	1,124	38.3	+10.6
Liberal Democrats	Parveen Khan	271	9.2	+6.1
Majority		415	14.1	
Turnout		2,969	32.4	
Registered electors		9,161		
Labour hold		Swing		

Langley Green and Ifield East
Party	Candidate	Votes	%	±%
Labour	Alison Cornell	1,502	41.7	−6.6
Conservative	Donald Butterfield	1,340	37.2	+0.8
Liberal Democrats	Naeem Shahzad	511	14.2	+9.3
Green	Iain Dickson	245	6.8	+3.6
Majority		162	4.5	
Turnout		3,364	33.8	
Registered electors		9,947		
Labour hold		Swing		

Maidenbower & Worth
Party	Candidate	Votes	%	±%
Conservative	Bob Lanzer	2,234	64.6	−0.5
Labour	Carlos Castro	762	22.0	+4.1
Green	Sally-Claire Fadelle	318	9.2	+6.3
Liberal Democrats	Mike Sargent	146	4.2	−5.5
Majority		1,472	42.5	
Turnout		3,514	38.6	
Registered electors		9,101		
Conservative hold		Swing		

Northgate & West Green
Party	Candidate	Votes	%	±%
Labour	Natalie Pudaloff	1,309	43.6	−5.8
Conservative	Jan Tarrant	1,139	37.9	+2.7
Independent	Karen Sudan	320	10.6	N/A
Liberal Democrats	David Anderson	237	7.9	+2.9
Majority		170	5.7	
Turnout		3,041	33.2	
Registered electors		9,166		
Labour hold		Swing		

Pound Hill
Party	Candidate	Votes	%	±%
Conservative	Richard Burrett	1,645	60.1	−5.9
Labour	Bob Noyce	730	26.7	+7.6
Green	Cyril Gambrell	288	10.5	+6.3
Liberal Democrats	Clive Trott	74	2.7	−4.4
Majority		915	33.4	
Turnout		2,769	35.9	
Registered electors		7,715		
Conservative hold		Swing		

Southgate and Gossops Green
Party	Candidate	Votes	%	±%
Conservative	Zack Ali	1,784	45.8	+1.6
Labour	Michael Jones	1,574	40.4	−4.5
Green	Robin Fitton	243	6.2	+1.6
Liberal Democrats	Andrew Eastman	203	5.2	N/A
Reform	Colin Thornback	92	2.4	N/A
Majority		210	5.4	
Turnout		3,924	39.5	
Registered electors		9,940		
Conservative gain from Labour		Swing		

Three Bridges
Party	Candidate	Votes	%	±%
Conservative	Brenda Burgess	1,624	47.0	+2.0
Labour	Linda Gregory	1,412	40.9	+7.0
Green	Danielle Kail	283	8.2	+4.1
Liberal Democrats	Paul Taylor-Burr	136	3.9	−1.8
Majority		212	6.1	
Turnout		3,437	39.6	
Registered electors		8,672		
Conservative hold		Swing		

Tilgate and Furnace Green
Party	Candidate	Votes	%	±%
Conservative	Duncan Crow	1,989	56.7	−1.4
Labour	Colin Lloyd	1,163	33.2	+4.5
Green	Tom Coombes	254	7.2	+4.8
Liberal Democrats	Harry Old	99	2.8	−2.3
Majority		826	23.6	
Turnout		3,550	39.5	
Registered electors		8,980		
Conservative hold		Swing		

=== Horsham ===
Billingshurst
Party	Candidate	Votes	%	±%
Conservative	Amanda Jupp	2,051	53.0	−10.3
Labour	Christopher Henson	723	18.7	+9.3
Liberal Democrats	Chris Geeson	719	18.6	+0.4
Green	Emma Rothwell	375	9.7	N/A
Majority		1,328	34.3	
Turnout		3,894	37.4	
Registered electors		10,419		
Conservative hold		Swing		

Bramber Castle
Party	Candidate	Votes	%	±%
Conservative	Paul Linehan	1,669	43.2	−10.6
Labour	Simon Birnstingl	831	21.5	+11.7
Green	Mike Croker	762	19.7	+12.1
Liberal Democrats	Nick Hopkinson	603	15.6	−10.2
Majority		838	21.7	
Turnout		3,887	42.3	
Registered electors		9,179		
Conservative hold		Swing		

Broadbridge
Party	Candidate	Votes	%	±%
Conservative	Christian Mitchell	1,837	51.2	−6.7
Liberal Democrats	Belinda Walters	1,010	28.1	+5.8
Green	Catherine Ross	434	12.1	+5.7
Labour	Joanne Kavanagh	307	8.6	+1.0
Majority		827	23.0	
Turnout		3,627	37.0	
Registered electors		9,812		
Conservative hold		Swing		

Henfield
Party	Candidate	Votes	%	±%
Conservative	Sarah Payne	2,117	53.3	−17.1
Labour	Fiona Ayres	944	23.8	+10.4
Green	Celia Emmott	608	15.3	N/A
Liberal Democrats	David Epps	303	7.6	−8.6
Majority		1,173	29.5	
Turnout		3,992	43.9	
Registered electors		9,090		
Conservative hold		Swing		

Holbrook
Party	Candidate	Votes	%	±%
Conservative	Andrew Baldwin	1,660	45.8	−17.1
Liberal Democrats	Ruth Fletcher	1,537	42.4	+21.6
Labour	Ray Chapman	431	11.9	+1.9
Majority		123	3.4	
Turnout		3,653	40.5	
Registered electors		9,016		
Conservative hold		Swing		

Horsham East
Party	Candidate	Votes	%	±%
Liberal Democrats	Jay Mercer	1,490	41.2	+8.1
Conservative	Ross Dye	1,388	38.4	−10.0
Labour	Gerard Kavanagh	433	12.0	+3.7
Green	Ferial MacTavish	302	8.4	+4.3
Majority		102	2.8	
Turnout		3,640	40.8	
Registered electors		8,911		
Liberal Democrats gain from Conservative		Swing		

Horsham Hurst
Party	Candidate	Votes	%	±%
Liberal Democrats	Nigel Dennis	2,406	59.6	+6.9
Conservative	David Thompson	1,012	25.1	−6.9
Labour	Carol Hayton	617	15.3	+3.4
Majority		1,394	34.5	
Turnout		4,053	44.7	
Registered electors		9,077		
Liberal Democrats hold		Swing		

Horsham Riverside
Party	Candidate	Votes	%	±%
Liberal Democrats	John Milne	1,653	46.0	+2.4
Conservative	Tony Hogben	1,244	34.6	−2.3
Labour	David Hide	489	13.6	+3.1
Peace	Jim Duggan	208	5.8	+2.6
Majority		409	11.4	
Turnout		3,615	39.0	
Registered electors		9,260		
Liberal Democrats hold		Swing		

Pulborough
Party	Candidate	Votes	%	±%
Conservative	Charlotte Kenyon	2,303	57.8	−7.9
Green	Jon Campbell	577	14.5	N/A
Liberal Democrats	Alex Beveridge	546	13.7	−3.6
Labour	Nick Dalton	440	11.0	+1.4
For Britain	Jo Hughes	118	3.0	N/A
Majority		1,726	43.3	
Turnout		4,002	39.6	
Registered electors		10,112		
Conservative hold		Swing		

Southwater & Nuthurst
Party	Candidate	Votes	%	±%
Conservative	Nigel Jupp	1,807	49.2	−5.9
Liberal Democrats	Nick Grant	1,112	30.3	+5.1
Green	Morag Warrack	422	11.5	+4.7
Labour	Kevin O'Sullivan	330	9.0	+2.2
Majority		695	18.9	
Turnout		3,696	37.5	
Registered electors		9,869		
Conservative hold		Swing		

St Leonards Forest
Party	Candidate	Votes	%	±%
Conservative	Katie Nagel	1,418	54.6	−7.5
Liberal Democrats	Sam Raby	787	30.3	+12.8
Labour	Sara Loewenthal	394	15.2	+4.9
Majority		631	24.3	
Turnout		2,629	33.4	
Registered electors		7,866		
Conservative hold		Swing		

Storrington
Party	Candidate	Votes	%	±%
Conservative	Paul Marshall	2,594	56.9	−5.1
Green	Claudia Fisher	1,294	28.4	N/A
Labour	James Ross	420	9.2	−0.6
Liberal Democrats	Ian Miles	250	5.5	−14.8
Majority		1,300	28.5	
Turnout		4,594	43.6	
Registered electors		10,527		
Conservative hold		Swing		

=== Mid Sussex ===
Burgess Hill East
Party	Candidate	Votes	%	±%
Liberal Democrats	Richard Cherry	1,726	43.0	+12.7
Conservative	Anne Jones	1,478	36.9	−4.4
Labour	Sue Jex	386	9.6	−1.0
Green	Ann Pearce	327	8.2	+4.2
Reform	Terence Gibbs	93	2.3	N/A
Majority		248	6.2	3.7
Turnout		4,033	39.6	
Registered electors		10,178		
Liberal Democrats gain from Conservative		Swing		

Burgess Hill North
Party	Candidate	Votes	%	±%
Liberal Democrats	Stuart Condie	1,448	40.9	+26.8
Conservative	Andrew Barrett-Miles	1,354	38.2	−2.0
Green	Bob Foster	398	11.2	+7.5
Labour	Pam Haigh	342	9.7	−4.0
Majority		94	2.7	
Turnout		3,566	35.8	
Registered electors		9,948		
Liberal Democrats gain from Conservative		Swing		

Cuckfield and Lucastes
Party	Candidate	Votes	%	±%
Conservative	Pete Bradbury	1,740	46.1	−11.1
Liberal Democrats	Alison Rees	759	20.1	−4.7
Labour	Paul Kenny	586	15.5	+5.5
Green	Allan Murray	548	14.5	+6.5
Reform	Richard Rap	144	3.8	N/A
Majority		981	26.0	
Turnout		3,803	40.0	
Registered electors		9,512		
Conservative hold		Swing		

East Grinstead Meridian
Party	Candidate	Votes	%	±%
Conservative	Liz Bennett	1,532	54.4	−10.7
Independent	Norman Mockford	357	12.7	N/A
Liberal Democrats	Andrew Lane	350	12.4	+1.2
Labour	David Wilbraham	300	10.7	−1.9
Green	Alexandra Langridge	276	9.8	+3.5
Majority		1,175	41.7	
Turnout		2,836	32.1	
Registered electors		8,841		
Conservative hold		Swing		

East Grinstead South & Ashurst Wood
Party	Candidate	Votes	%	±%
Conservative	Jacquie Russell	1,699	51.8	−4.0
Liberal Democrats	Amanda Clark	806	24.6	+1.4
Green	Laura Buonocore	389	11.9	+3.0
Labour	Stephen Pritchard	292	8.9	+1.7
Reform	Dave MacQuire	92	2.8	N/A
Majority		893	27.2	
Turnout		3,300	34.9	
Registered electors		9,460		
Conservative hold		Swing		

Hassocks and Burgess Hill South
Party	Candidate	Votes	%	±%
Liberal Democrats	Kirsty Lord	2,818	61.9	+23.0
Conservative	Alexander Simmons	1,184	26.0	−12.4
Labour	Fred Burns	551	12.1	−1.7
Majority		1,634	35.9	
Turnout		4,568	48.3	
Registered electors		9,451		
Liberal Democrats hold		Swing		

Haywards Heath East
Party	Candidate	Votes	%	±%
Conservative	Stephen Hillier	1,493	49.1	−2.4
Labour	Richard Whiting	623	20.5	+2.5
Liberal Democrats	George Smith	468	15.4	−1.7
Green	Deanna Nicholson	457	15.0	+9.2
Majority		870	28.6	
Turnout		3,067	34.6	
Registered electors		8,862		
Conservative hold		Swing		

Haywards Heath Town
Party	Candidate	Votes	%	±%
Conservative	Sujan Wickremaratchi	1,375	37.8	−10.0
Liberal Democrats	Stephanie Inglesfield	1,257	34.5	+2.1
Labour	Gregory Mountain	553	15.2	+0.7
Green	Michael Miller	365	10.0	+4.7
Democratic Network	Jonathan Lea	90	2.5	N/A
Majority		118	3.2	
Turnout		3,676	39.4	
Registered electors		9,320		
Conservative hold		Swing		

Hurstpierpoint and Bolney
Party	Candidate	Votes	%	±%
Conservative	Joy Dennis	1,774	41.0	−8.7
Liberal Democrats	Fiona Jackson	1,482	34.2	+7.4
Green	Nick Dearden	534	12.3	+4.7
Labour	Alison Whelan	418	9.7	−1.1
Monster Raving Loony	Baron von Thunderclap	122	2.8	+1.7
Majority		292	6.7	
Turnout		4,365	42.5	
Registered electors		10,260		
Conservative hold		Swing		

Imberdown
Party	Candidate	Votes	%	±%
Independent	Ian Gibson	1,843	53.1	+21.1
Conservative	Norman Webster	1,286	37.1	−10.7
Labour	Daniel Everett	316	9.1	+3.0
For Britain	Barry Noldart	25	0.7	N/A
Majority		557	16.1	
Turnout		3,481	38.9	
Registered electors		8,940		
Independent gain from Conservative		Swing		

Lindfield and High Weald
Party	Candidate	Votes	%	±%
Conservative	Garry Wall	2,016	43.9	−14.6
Liberal Democrats	Anne-Marie Cooke	1,393	30.3	+14.5
Green	David Woolley	779	17.0	+4.0
Labour	Tim Weekes	403	8.8	−0.5
Majority		623	13.6	
Turnout		4,639	45.5	
Registered electors		10,205		
Conservative hold		Swing		

Worth Forest
Party	Candidate	Votes	%	±%
Conservative	Bruce Forbes	2,082	57.5	−7.1
Green	Jenny Edwards	798	22.1	+15.0
Liberal Democrats	Cavan Wood	363	10.0	−3.9
Independent	Carole Steggles	292	8.1	N/A
Reform	Dominic Moorhouse	83	2.3	N/A
Majority		1,284	35.5	
Turnout		3,648	34.3	
Registered electors		10,634		
Conservative hold		Swing		

=== Worthing ===
Broadwater
Party	Candidate	Votes	%	±%
Labour	Dawn Smith	1,631	45.8	+12.1
Conservative	Bryan Turner	1,410	39.6	−2.4
Green	Richard Battson	309	8.7	+2.3
Liberal Democrats	John Apsey	215	6.0	−5.9
Majority		221	6.2	
Turnout		3,630	38.1	
Registered electors		9,533		
Labour gain from Conservative		Swing		

Cissbury
Party	Candidate	Votes	%	±%
Conservative	Elizabeth Sparkes	2,320	64.8	−1.1
Labour	Ibsha Choudhury	550	15.4	+4.9
Green	Julie Dawe	347	9.7	+5.0
Liberal Democrats	Iona Harte	323	9.0	−3.7
For Britain	Mick Clark	38	1.1	N/A
Majority		1,770	49.5	
Turnout		3,612	40.8	
Registered electors		8,845		
Conservative hold		Swing		

Durrington and Salvington
Party	Candidate	Votes	%	±%
Conservative	Noel Atkins	1,736	56.2	+5.1
Labour	Helen Silman	648	21.0	+8.2
Liberal Democrats	Emma Norton	449	14.5	−6.2
Green	James Darrall	255	8.3	+3.8
Majority		1,088	35.2	
Turnout		3,125	31.8	
Registered electors		9,817		
Conservative hold		Swing		

Goring
Party	Candidate	Votes	%	±%
Conservative	Steve Waight	1,949	57.5	−3.8
Labour	Jim Deen	784	23.1	+9.2
Green	Trevor Hopkins	440	13.0	+6.8
Liberal Democrats	Robin Rogers	214	6.3	−5.0
Majority		1,165	34.4	
Turnout		3,420	38.9	
Registered electors		8,783		
Conservative hold		Swing		

Northbrook
Party	Candidate	Votes	%	±%
Conservative	Sean McDonald	1,507	49.7	−0.1
Labour	Ingrid Allan	930	30.6	+16.8
Liberal Democrats	Nick Wiltshire	342	11.3	−8.3
Green	Joe Pearce	256	8.4	+3.3
Majority		577	19.0	
Turnout		3,086	30.1	
Registered electors		10,247		
Conservative hold		Swing		

Tarring
Party	Candidate	Votes	%	±%
Labour	Henna Chowdhury	1,221	31.3	+16.4
Conservative	Edward Crouch	1,193	30.5	−4.3
Liberal Democrats	Hazel Thorpe	1,114	28.5	−9.9
Green	Stephen Carleysmith	301	7.7	+2.5
Libertarian	Marco Di Paola	78	2.0	N/A
Majority		28	0.7	
Turnout		3,950	39.5	
Registered electors		9,988		
Labour gain from Liberal Democrats		Swing		

Worthing East
Party	Candidate	Votes	%	±%
Labour	Caroline Baxter	1,669	48.6	+11.1
Conservative	Alex Harman	1,154	33.6	−4.8
Green	Jo Paul	392	11.4	+4.6
Liberal Democrats	Yvonne Leonard	217	6.3	−4.5
Majority		515	15.0	
Turnout		3,489	37.4	
Registered electors		9,329		
Labour gain from Conservative		Swing		

Worthing Pier
Party	Candidate	Votes	%	±%
Labour	John Turley	1,276	39.2	+8.1
Conservative	Michael Cloake	1,185	36.4	−0.8
Green	Ian Davey	558	17.1	−2.1
Liberal Democrats	Christine Brown	236	7.3	0.0
Majority		91	2.8	
Turnout		3,295	33.9	
Registered electors		9,712		
Labour gain from Conservative		Swing		

Worthing West
Party	Candidate	Votes	%	±%
Labour	Beccy Cooper	1,824	46.4	+24.5
Conservative	Paul High	1,540	39.1	−12.5
Green	Sonya Mallin	285	7.2	−1.3
Liberal Democrats	Jacqueline Cranefield	171	4.3	−7.7
Independent	Christopher Woodward	114	2.9	N/A
Majority		284	7.2	
Turnout		3,958	44.0	
Registered electors		8,988		
Labour gain from Conservative		Swing		

== Changes 2021–2026 ==
- October 2021: Mike Magill (Conservative) resigns – by-election held November 2021
- November 2021: Andrew Kerry-Bedell (Liberal Democrats) gains by-election from Conservatives
- June 2022: Beccy Cooper (Labour) resigns – by-election held July 2022
- July 2022:
  - Graham McKnight (Labour) wins by-election
  - John Charles (Conservative) dies – by-election held September 2022
- September 2022: Jaine Wild (Independent) gains by-election from Conservatives
- March 2023: Liz Bennett (Conservative) resigns – by-election held May 2023
- May 2023: John Dabell (Conservative) wins by-election
- June 2024: Gary Markwell (Conservative) leaves party to sit as an independent; Trevor Bence (Conservative) leaves party to join the Green and Independent Alliance group
- September 2024: Gary Markwell (Independent) joins Reform
- October 2024: Trevor Bence (Independent) joins Reform
- November 2024: Julian Joy (Liberal Democrats) leaves party to sit as an independent
- December 2024: Paul Linehan (Conservative) joins Reform
- January 2025: Andrew Baldwin (Conservative) joins Reform
- February 2025: Andrew Kerry-Bedell (Liberal Democrats) joins the Green and Independent Alliance group
- March 2025: Kate O'Kelly (Liberal Democrats) resigns – by-election held May 2025
- April 2025:
  - John Milne (Liberal Democrats) resigns – by-election held May 2025
  - Stuart Condie (Liberal Democrats) and Kirsty Lord (Liberal Democrats) resign, both citing the cancellation of the 2025 election, at which they had each intended to stand down – by-elections held June 2025
  - Katie Nagel (Conservative) resigns – by-election held June 2025
- May 2025: Yvonne Gravely (Liberal Democrats) and Louise Potter (Liberal Democrats) win by-elections
- June 2025:
  - Jane Davey (Liberal Democrats) and Erika Woodhurst-Trueman (Liberal Democrats) win by-elections
  - Sam Raby (Liberal Democrats) gains by-election from the Conservatives
- July 2025: David Britton (Conservative) leaves party to sit as an independent
- September 2025: Graham McKnight (Labour) leaves party to sit as an independent
- January 2026: David Britton (Independent) resigns – seat left vacant until 2026 election

=== Bourne ===
Bourne: 4 November 2021
Party	Candidate	Votes	%	±%
Liberal Democrats	Andrew Kerry-Bedell	1,180	51.8	+22.8
Conservative	Bob Hayes	893	39.2	−11.7
Green	Ann Stewart	178	7.8	−3.1
Labour	Alan Butcher	25	1.1	−8.1
Majority		287	12.6	
Turnout		2,281	22.5	
Liberal Democrats gain from Conservative		Swing	▲17.3	

The by-election was triggered by the resignation of Conservative councillor Mike Magill.

=== Worthing West ===
Worthing West: 7 July 2022
Party	Candidate	Votes	%	±%
Labour	Graham McKnight	1,262	52.0	+5.6
Conservative	Michael Cloake	795	32.8	–6.3
Liberal Democrats	Hazel Thorpe	235	9.7	+5.4
Green	Joanne Paul	133	5.5	–1.7
Majority		467	19.2	
Turnout		2,433	27.0	
Registered electors		9,019		
Labour hold		Swing	▲6.0	

The by-election was triggered by the resignation of Labour councillor Beccy Cooper, after she became leader of Worthing Borough Council.

=== Felpham ===
Felpham: 8 September 2022
Party	Candidate	Votes	%	±%
Independent	Jaine Wild	803	43.4	N/A
Conservative	David Darling	733	39.6	–12.8
Labour	David Meagher	217	11.7	+3.5
Independent	Richard Parker	99	5.3	–14.8
Majority		70	3.8	
Turnout		1,857	19.2	
Registered electors		9,664		
Independent gain from Conservative		Swing	N/A	

The by-election was triggered by the death of Conservative councillor John Charles.

=== East Grinstead Meridian ===
East Grinstead Meridian: 4 May 2023
Party	Candidate	Votes	%	±%
Conservative	John Dabell	1,064	43.6	–10.8
Independent	Norman Mockford	467	19.1	+6.4
Liberal Democrats	Andrew Lane	365	14.9	+2.5
Labour	Timothy Cornell	340	13.9	+3.2
Green	Alex Langridge	207	8.5	–1.3
Majority		597	24.5	
Turnout		2,473	28.4	
Registered electors		8,710		
Conservative hold		Swing	▼8.6	

The by-election was triggered by the resignation of Conservative councillor Liz Bennett.

=== Midhurst ===
Midhurst by-election: 1 May 2025
Party	Candidate	Votes	%	±%
Liberal Democrats	Yvonne Gravely	1,349	40.1	−17.0
Conservative	Tom Crofts	1,119	33.3	−5.3
Reform	Adam Kirby	662	19.7	N/A
Green	Adrian Morris	155	4.6	N/A
Labour	Juliette Reynolds	73	2.2	−2.1
Patria	Andrew Emerson	7	0.2	N/A
Majority		230	6.8	N/A
Turnout		3,371	38.35	
Registered electors		8,804		
Liberal Democrats hold		Swing		

The by-election was triggered by the resignation of Liberal Democrat councillor Kate O'Kelly.

=== Horsham Riverside ===
Horsham Riverside 22 May 2025
Party	Candidate	Votes	%	±%
Liberal Democrats	Louise Potter	1,193	45.7	−0.2
Conservative	David Thompson	569	21.8	−12.8
Reform	Jack Nye	547	21	N/A
Labour	David Hide	181	6.9	−6.7
Green	Jen Nuin Smith	118	4.5	N/A
Majority		624	23.9	
Turnout		2608	27	
Registered electors		9,519		
Liberal Democrats hold		Swing		

The by-election was triggered by the resignation of Liberal Democrat councillor John Milne.

=== Burgess Hill North ===
Burgess Hill North by-election: 5 June 2025
Party	Candidate	Votes	%	±%
Liberal Democrats	Jane Davey	1,088	40.9	±0.0
Reform	Tim Cooper	707	26.6	N/A
Conservative	Mustak Miah	618	23.3	–14.9
Green	Paul Woods	153	5.8	–5.4
Labour	Jake Tennant	92	3.5	–6.2
Majority		381	14.3	+11.6
Turnout		2,662	26.9	N/A
Registered electors		9,895		
Liberal Democrats hold				

The by-election was triggered by the resignation of Liberal Democrat councillor Stuart Condie, who cited the cancellation of the 2025 election, at which he had intended to stand down.

=== Hassocks & Burgess Hill South ===
Hassocks & Burgess Hill South by-election: 5 June 2025
Party	Candidate	Votes	%	±%
Liberal Democrats	Erika Woodhurst-Trueman	1,694	55.3	–6.6
Reform	Pete Bradshaw	762	24.9	N/A
Conservative	Eliza-Jane Brazil	310	10.1	–15.9
Green	Sue Kelly	175	5.7	N/A
Labour	Martin McCabe	123	4.0	–8.1
Majority		932	30.4	–5.5
Turnout		3,068	31.0	N/A
Registered electors		9,895		
Liberal Democrats hold				

The by-election was triggered by the resignation of Liberal Democrat councillor Kirsty Lord, who cited the cancellation of the 2025 election, at which she had intended to stand down.

=== St Leonards Forest ===
St Leonards Forest by-election: 5 June 2025
Party	Candidate	Votes	%	±%
Liberal Democrats	Sam Raby	644	32.5	+2.2
Reform	Robert Nye	584	29.5	N/A
Conservative	Damian Stuart	401	20.2	–34.4
Green	Andrew Finnegan	259	13.1	N/A
Labour	Sara Lowenthal	94	4.7	–10.5
Majority		60	3.0	N/A
Turnout		1,982	23.0	N/A
Registered electors		8,625		
Liberal Democrats gain from Conservative				

The by-election was triggered by the resignation of Conservative councillor Katie Nagel.
