= Peace Party (UK) =

- Leader: John Morris
- Chairman: Geoff Pay
- Founded: 1996; 30 years ago
- Headquarters: Guildford
- Ideology: Pacifism; Environmentalism
- Colours: Orange

Website
- www.peaceparty.org.uk

The Peace Party is a minor political party in the United Kingdom, founded in Surrey in 1996, campaigning mainly for pacifist and environmentalist issues. Its leader John Morris had stood at every general election since 1997.

== History ==
The party was founded in 1996 as the Pacifist Campaign by a group of activists, including Quakers, in Guildford, Surrey. In 2001 it became the Pacifist Party and it was registered with the Electoral Commission in 2003 as "The Peace Party - Non-violence, Justice, Environment". The leader, retired geography teacher John Morris, has as of 2019 stood for the party in every general election since the party was founded, and though he expects to lose he says "Standing at election time means the word peace and some of the other words we use get put in front of everybody who is of voting age. It's worth the lost deposit - it's £500 well spent."

The party stood one candidate, John Morris, in the 1997 and 2001 general elections in the Guildford constituency, and two in the 2005 election with Caroline O'Reilly also standing in Brighton Kemptown. It fielded nine candidates in the South East England constituency during the 2004 European election, gaining 12,572 votes. This was equivalent to 0.6% of the votes cast in the South East and more than three other parties. The party has also stood in a number of local elections in Dartford, Kent, Horsham, West Sussex and Guildford. The party stood again in the 2009 European election in the South East region, winning 9,534 votes (0.4%).

The party fielded three candidates in the 2010 general election, who gained a total of 737 votes.

The Peace Party gained its first councillor in Bradford in November 2012 when Imdad Hussain joined after being suspended from the Labour Party for failing to declare a company directorship. He stood for the party in the 2012 Middlesbrough by-election achieving the Peace Party's first saved deposit with 1,060 votes (6.3%), only three votes fewer than the Conservative candidate. However, Hussain lost his council seat in the 2014 local election, coming second to Labour. They also stood in the South East region for the 2014 European Parliament elections, winning 10,130 votes (0.4%).

The party fielded four candidates in the 2015 general election, including Morris, Tommy Holgate, previously Comedy Editor for The Sun newspaper, Jim Duggan, and Tania Mahmood, who together received a total of 957 votes. There were two Peace candidates in the 2017 general election who gained a total of 438 votes. They did not contest the 2019 European Parliament elections.

The party stood in two constituencies at the 2019 general election and won 960 votes. They again stood in two constituencies at the 2024 general election, receiving 531 votes.

== Policies ==
The Peace Party seeks to promote a society that is compassionate and respectful, and that values cooperation over competition.

They support conflict resolution, demilitarisation, drug legalisation, end felony disenfranchisement, and proportional representation.
