= List of boundary changes in South West England =

Map of South West England

This is a list of boundary changes occurring in the South West England region of England, since the re-organisation of local government following the passing of the Local Government Act 1972.

== Administrative boundaries ==
=== Initial creation ===
When the Local Government Act 1972 was passed there were still some details left to be decided, the Local Government Boundary Commission for England's first work was to clarify these details.

Date	Statutory Instrument	LGBCE Report
1 February 1973	The English Non-Metropolitan Districts (Definition) Order 1972	Report No. 001: Recommendations for new Districts in the non-Metropolitan Counties November 1972
5 March 1973	The Divided Areas (Boundaries) Order 1973	n/a
1 May 1973	The English Non-Metropolitan Districts (Names) Order 1973	Report No. 002: Names of Non-Metropolitan Districts March 1973

=== Principal Area Boundary Reviews ===
The Local Government Boundary Commission for England (or LGBCE) was established by the Local Government Act 1972 to review the administrative boundaries of every local authority in England. Between 1974 and 1992 they completed a series of Principal Area Boundary Reviews; reviewing the administrative boundaries of local authorities at their request.

Date	Statutory Instrument	Effect	LGBCE Report(s)
1 April 1977	The Cornwall and Devon (Areas) Order 1977	Changes to the North Cornwall (Cornwall)/Torridge (Devon) boundary	
1 April 1981	The North Wiltshire and Thamesdown (Areas) Order 1980	Changes to the North Wiltshire/Thamesdown (both Wiltshire) boundary	Report No. 380: Thamesdown/North Wiltshire April 1980
1 April 1981	The Oxfordshire and Wiltshire (Areas) Order 1980	Changes to the Thamesdown (Wiltshire)/Vale of White Horse (Oxfordshire) boundary	
1 April 1983	The Avon and Somerset (Areas) Order 1983	Changes to the Sedgemoor (Somerset)/Woodspring (Avon) boundary	Report No. 420: Woodspring/Sedgemoor November 1981
1 April 1984	The Bristol, Wansdyke and Woodspring (Areas) Order 1984	Changes to the boundaries of: Bristol (Avon); Wansdyke (Avon); Woodspring (Avon)	Report No. 437: Wansdyke/Woodspring/Mendip/Bristol December 1982
1 April 1985	The Sedgemoor and Taunton Deane (Areas) Order 1984	Changes to the Sedgemoor/Taunton Deane (both Somerset) boundary	Report No. 434: Taunton Deane/Sedgemoor September 1982
1 April 1985	The Mid Devon, South Hams and Teignbridge (Areas) Order 1985	Changes to the: Mid Devon/Teignbridge (both Devon) boundary; South Hams/Teignbridge (both Devon) boundary	Report No. 455: Teignbridge/South Hams/Mid Devon October 1983
1 April 1986	The Devon (District Boundaries) Order 1985	Changes to the Plymouth/South Hams (both Devon) boundary	Report No. 467: South Hams/Plymouth March 1984
1 April 1988	The Devon (District Boundaries) Order 1987	Changes to the: Exeter/East Devon (both Devon) boundary; Exeter/Teignbridge (both Devon) boundary	Report No. 521: Exeter/East Devon/Teignbridge December 1986
1 April 1988	The Dorset (District Boundaries) Order 1987	Changes to the North Dorset/Purbeck (both Dorset) boundary	Report No. 525: North Dorset/Purbeck December 1986
1 April 1991	The Gloucestershire (District Boundaries) Order 1991	Changes to the: Tewkesbury/Gloucester (both Gloucestershire) boundary; Stroud/Gloucester (both Gloucestershire) boundary; Tewkesbury/Cheltenham (both Gloucestershire) boundary; Tewkesbury/Cotswold (both Gloucestershire) boundary	Report No. 547: Gloucester/Cheltenham/Cotswold/Stroud/Tewkesbury March 1988
1 April 1992	The Mid Devon, Torridge and West Devon (District Boundaries) Order 1991	Changes to the: Mid Devon/West Devon (both Devon) boundary; Torridge/West Devon (both Devon) boundary	Report No. 564: West Devon/Mid Devon/Torridge September 1988

Other principal area boundary reviews

- Report No. 12: Mendip Hills (Avon/Somerset) December 1974

=== Mandatory Reviews of non-Metropolitan Counties, Metropolitan Districts and London Boroughs ===
In 1985 they began the first full administrative review of all non-metropolitan counties. Their reviews of metropolitan counties and Greater London began in 1987 and both reviews were completed in 1992.

Date	Statutory Instrument	Effect	LGBCE Report(s)
1 April 1990	The Berkshire, Dorset and Wiltshire (County Boundaries) Order 1989	Changes to the: Kennet (Wiltshire)/Newbury (Berkshire) boundary; Salisbury (Wiltshire)/North Dorset (Dorset) boundary	Report No. 556: Wiltshire July 1988
1 April 1990	The Avon, Somerset and Wiltshire (County Boundaries) Order 1990	Changes to the: Wansdyke (Avon)/Mendip (Somerset) boundary; Woodspring (Avon)/Sedgemoor (Somerset) boundary; Northavon (Avon)/North Wiltshire (Wiltshire) boundary	No. 568: Avon November 1988
1 April 1990	The Gloucestershire and Wiltshire (County Boundaries) Order 1990	Changes to the North Wiltshire (Wiltshire)/Cotswold (Gloucestershire) boundary	
1 April 1991	The Avon and Gloucestershire (County Boundaries) Order 1991	Changes to the Northavon (Avon)/Stroud (Gloucestershire) boundary	
1 April 1991	The Dorset and Somerset (County Boundaries) Order 1991	Changes to the West Dorset (Dorset)/South Somerset (Somerset) boundary	Report No. 572: Dorset April 1989
1 April 1992	The Dorset, Hampshire, West Sussex and Wiltshire (County Boundaries) Order 1991	Changes to the: Christchurch (Dorset)/New Forest (Hampshire) boundary; East Dorset (Dorset)/New Forest (Hampshire) boundary; New Forest (Hampshire)/Salisbury (Wiltshire) boundary; Test Valley (Hampshire)/Kennet (Wiltshire) boundary; East Hampshire (Hampshire)/Chichester (West Sussex) boundary; Havant (Hampshire)/Chichester (West Sussex) boundary	Report No. 580: Hampshire January 1990

Other mandatory reviews of non-metropolitan counties, metropolitan districts and London boroughs

- Report No. 535: Cornwall and Devon April 1987
- Report No. 545: Somerset January 1988
- Report No. 574: Gloucestershire February 1989

== Electoral boundaries ==
=== Initial creation ===
When the Local Government Act 1972 was passed there was not sufficient time to draw up proper electoral boundaries for the new county and district councils, so a temporary system was quickly put in place, intended to only be used for the first elections in 1973.

Date	Statutory Instrument
7 June 1973	The County of Avon (District Wards) Order 1973
12 April 1973	The County of Avon (Electoral Divisions) Order 1973
7 June 1973	The County of Cornwall (District Wards) Order 1973
12 April 1973	The County of Cornwall (Electoral Divisions) Order 1973
7 June 1973	The County of Devon (District Wards) Order 1973
12 April 1973	The County of Devon (Electoral Divisions) Order 1973
7 June 1973	The County of Dorset (District Wards) Order 1973
12 April 1973	The County of Dorset (Electoral Divisions) Order 1973
7 June 1973	The County of Gloucestershire (District Wards) Order 1973
12 April 1973	The County of Gloucestershire (Electoral Divisions) Order 1973
7 June 1973	The County of Somerset (District Wards) Order 1973
12 April 1973	The County of Somerset (Electoral Divisions) Order 1973
7 June 1973	The County of Wiltshire (District Wards) Order 1973
12 April 1973	The County of Wiltshire (Electoral Divisions) Order 1973

=== First periodic review ===
The Local Government Boundary Commission for England (or LGBCE) was established by the Local Government Act 1972 to review the electoral boundaries of every local authority in England. In 1974 they began the first full electoral review of all metropolitan and non-metropolitan districts, completing it in July 1980. Their reviews of the county councils were completed in 1984.

Date	Statutory Instrument	LGBCE Report
6 May 1976	The Borough of Thamesdown (Electoral Arrangements) Order 1975	Report No. 037: Thamesdown August 1975
6 May 1976	The City of Bath (Electoral Arrangements) Order 1975	Report No. 017: Bath May 1975
6 May 1976	The District of Kingswood (Electoral Arrangements) Order 1975	Report No. 083: Kingswood October 1975
6 May 1976	The District of Northavon (Electoral Arrangements) Order 1975	Report No. 051: Northavon August 1975
6 May 1976	The District of Salisbury (Electoral Arrangements) Order 1975	Report No. 026: Salisbury August 1975
6 May 1976	The District of Wansdyke (Electoral Arrangements) Order 1975	Report No. 048: Wansdyke August 1975
6 May 1976	The District of Yeovil (Electoral Arrangements) Order 1975	Report No. 035: Yeovil August 1975
3 May 1979	The Borough of Taunton Deane (Electoral Arrangements) Order 1976	Report No. 111: Taunton Deane December 1975
3 May 1979	The City of Gloucester (Electoral Arrangements) Order 1976	Report No. 164: Gloucester August 1976
6 May 1976	The District of Kennet (Electoral Arrangements) Order 1976	Report No. 093: Kennet October 1975
3 May 1979	The District of Mendip (Electoral Arrangements) Order 1976	Report No. 125: Mendip January 1976
3 May 1979	The District of West Somerset (Electoral Arrangements) Order 1976	Report No. 108: West Somerset November 1975
3 May 1979	The District of Purbeck (Electoral Arrangements) Order 1977	Report No. 188: Purbeck March 1977
3 May 1979	The District of Sedgemoor (Electoral Arrangements) Order 1977	Report No. 167: Sedgemoor October 1976
3 May 1979	The District of South Hams (Electoral Arrangements) Order 1977	Report No. 198: South Hams April 1977
3 May 1979	The District of Tiverton (Electoral Arrangements) Order 1977	Report No. 195: Mid Devon April 1977
3 May 1979	The District of West Devon (Electoral Arrangements) Order 1977	Report No. 187: West Devon February 1977
3 May 1979	The District of Woodspring (Electoral Arrangements) Order 1977	Report No. 085: Woodspring November 1975
3 May 1979	The Borough of Bournemouth (Electoral Arrangements) Order 1978	Report No. 296: Bournemouth October 1978
3 May 1979	The Borough of Christchurch (Electoral Arrangements) Order 1978	Report No. 301: Christchurch October 1978
3 May 1979	The Borough of Weymouth and Portland (Electoral Arrangements) Order 1978	Report No. 297: Weymouth and Portland October 1978
3 May 1979	The City of Plymouth (Electoral Arrangements) Order 1978	Report No. 294: Plymouth October 1978
3 May 1979	The District of Carrick (Electoral Arrangements) Order 1978	Report No. 273: Carrick January 1978
3 May 1979	The District of Cotswold (Electoral Arrangements) Order 1978	Report No. 261: Cotswold November 1977
3 May 1979	The District of East Devon (Electoral Arrangements) Order 1978; The District of East Devon (Electoral Arrangements) (Amendment) Order 1979	Report No. 302: East Devon October 1978
3 May 1979	The District of Kerrier (Electoral Arrangements) Order 1978	Report No. 278: Kerrier January 1978
3 May 1979	The District of North Cornwall (Electoral Arrangements) Order 1978	Report No. 271: North Cornwall December 1978
3 May 1979	The District of Penwith (Electoral Arrangements) Order 1978	Report No. 239: Penwith August 1977
3 May 1979	The District of Teignbridge (Electoral Arrangements) Order 1978	Report No. 253: Teignbridge September 1977
3 May 1979	The District of Torridge (Electoral Arrangements) Order 1978	Report No. 295: Torridge October 1978
5 May 1983	The Borough of Cheltenham (Electoral Arrangements) Order 1979	Report No. 334: Cheltenham May 1979
5 May 1983	The Borough of Poole (Electoral Arrangements) Order 1979	Report No. 330: Poole March 1979
5 May 1983	The Borough of Restormel (Electoral Arrangements) Order 1979	Report No. 348: Restormel August 1979
5 May 1983	The Borough of Torbay (Electoral Arrangements) Order 1979	Report No. 343: Torbay June 1979
5 May 1983	The City of Exeter (Electoral Arrangements) Order 1979	Report No. 339: Exeter June 1979
5 May 1983	The District of North Wiltshire (Electoral Arrangements) Order 1979	Report No. 313: North Wiltshire December 1978
5 May 1983	The District of Stroud (Electoral Arrangements) Order 1979	Report No. 325: Stroud March 1979
5 May 1983	The District of West Wiltshire (Electoral Arrangements) Order 1979	Report No. 341: West Wiltshire June 1979
5 May 1983	The Borough of Tewkesbury (Electoral Arrangements) Order 1980	Report No. 368: Tewkesbury February 1980
5 May 1983	The City of Bristol (Electoral Arrangements) Order 1980	Report No. 353: Bristol September 1979
7 May 1981	The County of Somerset (Electoral Arrangements) Order 1980	Report No. 395: Somerset September 1980
5 May 1983	The District of Caradon (Electoral Arrangements) Order 1980	Report No. 375: Caradon March 1980
5 May 1983	The District of Forest of Dean (Electoral Arrangements) Order 1980	Report No. 360: Forest of Dean November 1979
5 May 1983	The District of North Devon (Electoral Arrangements) Order 1980	Report No. 364: North Devon November 1979
5 May 1983	The District of North Dorset (Electoral Arrangements) Order 1980	Report No. 392: North Dorset August 1980
5 May 1983	The District of West Dorset (Electoral Arrangements) Order 1980	Report No. 373: West Dorset February 1980
5 May 1983	The District of Wimborne (Electoral Arrangements) Order 1980	Report No. 384: Wimborne June 1980
7 May 1981	The County of Avon (Electoral Arrangements) Order 1981	Report No. 408: Avon December 1980
2 May 1985	The County of Devon (Electoral Arrangements) Order 1981	Report No. 410: Devon December 1980
7 May 1981	The County of Wiltshire (Electoral Arrangements) Order 1981	Report No. 405: Wiltshire November 1980
2 May 1985	The County of Dorset (Electoral Arrangements) Order 1983	Report No. 427: Dorset June 1982
2 May 1985	The County of Gloucestershire (Electoral Arrangements) Order 1983	Report No. 424: Gloucestershire May 1982
2 May 1985	The County of Cornwall (Electoral Arrangements) Order 1985	Report No. 456: Cornwall November 1983

=== Further electoral reviews by the LGBCE ===
Local authorities could request a further review if they felt that there were changes in circumstances since the initial review. The LGBCE would only approve this if they felt it was appropriate because of major changes in the size or distribution of the electorate.

Date	Statutory Instrument	LGBCE Report
2 May 1985	The County of Wiltshire (Miscellaneous Electoral Divisions) (Electoral Arrangements) Order 1985	Report No. 486: Wiltshire November 1984
7 May 1987	The Borough of Taunton Deane (Electoral Arrangements) Order 1986	Report No. 500: Taunton Deane July 1985
8 May 1986	The Borough of Thamesdown (Electoral Arrangements) Order 1986	Report No. 487: Thamesdown November 1984
2 May 1991	The Borough of Torbay (Electoral Arrangements) Order 1987	n/a (change in electoral cycle.)
7 May 1987	The District of Kingswood (Electoral Arrangements) Order 1987	Report No. 520: Kingswood December 1986
2 May 1991	The District of South Somerset (Electoral Arrangements) Order 1988	Report No. 544: South Somerset January 1988
2 May 1991	The Gloucestershire Districts (Electoral Arrangements) Order 1991; The Gloucestershire Districts (Electoral Arrangements) (Variation) Order 1991	Principal area boundary reviews: Report No. 581: Gloucester/Cheltenham/Cotswold/Stroud/Tewkesbury (Electoral Consequentials) February 1990; Report No. 597: Gloucester/Cheltenham/Cotswold/Stroud/Tewkesbury (Final Electoral Consequentials) January 1991
6 May 1993	The County of Wiltshire (Electoral Arrangements) Order 1993	Report No. 681: Wiltshire September 1992

Other further electoral review

- Report No. 621: Purbeck September 1992

=== Second periodic review ===
The Local Government Act 1992 established the Local Government Commission for England (or LGCE) as the successor to the LGBCE. In 1996 they began the second full electoral review of English local authorities. On 1 April 2002 the Boundary Committee for England (or BCfE) took over the functions of the LGBCE and carried on the review, completing it in 2004.

Date	Statutory Instrument	LGCE/BCfE Report(s)
7 May 1998	The City of Gloucester (Electoral Arrangements) Order 1997	Structural review: Draft report September 1995 Final report December 1995
6 May 1999	The Forest of Dean (Parishes and Electoral Changes) Order 1997	Parish Reviews: Report No. 686: Forest of Dean (Electoral Consequential) September 1992
6 May 1999	The Borough of Taunton Deane (Electoral Changes) Order 1998; The Borough of Taunton Deane (Electoral Changes) (Amendment) Order 2000	Draft report June 1997 Final report 4 November 1997
6 May 1999	The City of Bristol (Electoral Changes) Order 1998	Draft report December 1997 Final report March 1998
6 May 1999	The District of Bath and North East Somerset (Electoral Changes) Order 1998	Draft report 2 December 1997 Final report 31 March 1998
6 May 1999	The District of Mendip (Electoral Changes) Order 1998	Draft report May 1997 Final report 4 November 1997
6 May 1999	The District of North Somerset (Electoral Changes) Order 1998	Draft report 2 December 1997 Final report 31 March 1998
6 May 1999	The District of Purbeck (Electoral Changes) Order 1998	Draft report October 1996 Final report March 1997
6 May 1999	The District of Sedgemoor (Electoral Changes) Order 1998	Draft report June 1997 Final report November 1997
6 May 1999	The District of South Gloucestershire (Electoral Changes) Order 1998	Draft report 2 December 1997 Final report 31 March 1998
6 May 1999	The District of South Hams (Electoral Changes) Order 1998	Draft report May 1997 Final report November 1997
6 May 1999	The District of South Somerset (Electoral Changes) Order 1998	Draft report June 1997 Final report 4 November 1997
6 May 1999	The District of West Somerset (Electoral Changes) Order 1998	Draft report May 1997 Final report 4 November 1997
4 May 2000	The Borough of Swindon (Electoral Changes) Order 1999	Draft report September 1998 Final report 2 March 1999
1 May 2003	The Borough of West Devon (Electoral Changes) Order 1999; The Borough of West Devon (Electoral Changes) (Amendment) Order 2004	Draft report June 1998 Final report January 1999
4 May 2000	The City of Exeter (Electoral Changes) Order 1999	Draft report June 1998 Final report January 1999
1 May 2003	The District of East Devon (Electoral Changes) Order 1999	Draft report June 1998 Final report January 1999
1 May 2003	The District of Kennet (Electoral Changes) Order 1999	Draft report 1 September 1998 Final report 2 March 1999
1 May 2003	The District of Mid Devon (Electoral Changes) Order 1999	Draft report August 1998 Final report January 1999
1 May 2003	The District of North Devon (Electoral Changes) Order 1999	Draft report August 1998 Final report January 1999
1 May 2003	The District of North Wiltshire (Electoral Changes) Order 1999	Draft report 1 September 1998 Final report 2 March 1999
1 May 2003	The District of Salisbury (Electoral Changes) Order 1999	Draft report 1 September 1998 Final report 2 March 1999
1 May 2003	The District of Teignbridge (Electoral Changes) Order 1999	Draft report August 1998 Final report January 1999
1 May 2003	The District of Torridge (Electoral Changes) Order 1999	Draft report August 1998 Final report January 1999
1 May 2003	The District of West Wiltshire (Electoral Changes) Order 1999	Draft report 1 September 1998 Final report 2 March 1999
7 June 2001	The County of Somerset (Electoral Changes) Order 2000	Draft report May 1999 Final report November 1999
2 May 2002	The Borough of Cheltenham (Electoral Changes) Order 2001	Draft report 9 January 2001 Final report 26 June 2001
1 May 2003	The Borough of Tewkesbury (Electoral Changes) Order 2001	Draft report 9 January 2001 Final report 26 June 2001
2 May 2002	The City of Gloucester (Electoral Changes) Order 2001	Draft report 9 January 2001 Final report 26 June 2001
1 May 2003	The District of Cotswold (Electoral Changes) Order 2001	Draft report 9 January 2000 Final report 27 June 2000
1 May 2003	The District of Forest of Dean (Electoral Changes) Order 2001; The District of Forest of Dean (Electoral Changes) (Amendment) Order 2002	Draft report 9 January 2001 Final report 26 June 2001
2 May 2002	The District of Stroud (Parishes and Electoral Changes) Order 2001; The District of Stroud (Parishes and Electoral Changes) (Amendment) Order 2005	Draft report 9 January 2001 Final report 26 June 2001
1 May 2003	The Borough of Bournemouth (Electoral Changes) Order 2002	Draft report 19 June 2001 Final report 11 December 2001
1 May 2003	The Borough of Christchurch (Electoral Changes) Order 2002	Draft report 9 October 2001 Final report 3 April 2002
1 May 2003	The Borough of Poole (Electoral Changes) Order 2002	Draft report 26 February 2002 Final report 9 July 2002
1 May 2003	The Borough of Restormel (Electoral Changes) Order 2002	Draft report 27 November 2001 Final report 6 June 2002
1 May 2003	The Borough of Torbay (Electoral Changes) Order 2002	Draft report 19 June 2001 Final report 4 December 2001
10 June 2004	The Borough of Weymouth and Portland (Electoral Changes) Order 2002; The Borough of Weymouth and Portland (Electoral Changes) (Amendment) Order 2003	Draft report 9 October 2001 Final report 3 April 2002
1 May 2003	The City of Plymouth (Electoral Changes) Order 2002	Draft report 19 June 2001 Final report 4 December 2001
1 May 2003	The District of Caradon (Electoral Changes) Order 2002	Draft report 27 November 2001 Final report 6 June 2002
1 May 2003	The District of Carrick (Electoral Changes) Order 2002	Draft report 15 January 2002 Final report 6 June 2002
1 May 2003	The District of East Dorset (Electoral Changes) Order 2002	Draft report 9 October 2001 Final report 3 April 2002
1 May 2003	The District of Kerrier (Electoral Changes) Order 2002	Draft report 15 January 2002 Final report 6 June 2002
1 May 2003	The District of North Cornwall (Electoral Changes) Order 2002	Draft report 27 November 2001 Final report 6 June 2002
1 May 2003	The District of North Dorset (Electoral Changes) Order 2002	Draft report 9 October 2001 Final report 3 April 2002
10 June 2004	The District of Penwith (Electoral Changes) Order 2002	Draft report 15 January 2002 Final report 6 June 2002
1 May 2003	The District of West Dorset (Electoral Changes) Order 2002	Draft report 9 October 2001 Final report 3 April 2002
5 May 2005	The County of Devon (Electoral Changes) Order 2004	Draft report 22 February 2000 Final report 22 August 2000
5 May 2005	The County of Dorset (Electoral Changes) Order 2004	Draft report 13 January 2004 Final report 27 July 2004
5 May 2005	The County of Gloucestershire (Electoral Changes) Order 2004	Draft report 27 August 2003 Final report 27 April 2004
5 May 2005	The County of Wiltshire (Electoral Changes) Order 2004	Draft report 28 May 2003 Final report 2 March 2004
5 May 2005	The County of Cornwall (Electoral Changes) Order 2005	Draft report 24 February 2004 Final report 14 September 2004

=== Further electoral reviews by the BCfE ===
Date	Statutory Instrument	BCfE Report(s)
3 May 2007	The Borough of Taunton Deane (Electoral Changes) Order 2007	Draft report November 2005 Final report July 2006
3 May 2007	The District of Mendip (Electoral Changes) Order 2007	Draft report January 2006 Final report August 2006
3 May 2007	The District of North Wiltshire (Electoral Changes) Order 2007	Draft report January 2006 Final report September 2006
3 May 2007	The District of South Gloucestershire (Electoral Changes) Order 2007	Draft report June 2005 Final report May 2006
3 May 2007	The District of West Wiltshire (Electoral Changes) Order 2007	Draft report February 2006 Final report September 2006
4 June 2009	The Cornwall (Electoral Arrangements and Consequential Amendments) Order 2009	Draft report December 2008 Final report December 2009
4 June 2009	The County of Wiltshire (Electoral Changes) Order 2009	Final report November 2008

=== Further electoral reviews by the LGBCE ===
The Local Government Boundary Commission for England (or LGBCE) was established by the Local Democracy, Economic Development and Construction Act 2009 on 1 April 2010 as the successor to the BCfE. It continues to review the electoral arrangements of English local authorities on an ‘as and when’ basis.

Date	Statutory Instrument	LGBCE Report(s)
2 May 2013	The Cornwall (Electoral Changes) Order 2011	Final report December 2009
5 May 2011	The Sedgemoor (Electoral Changes) Order 2011	Final report October 2010
5 May 2011	The West Somerset (Electoral Changes) Order 2011	Final report July 2010
3 May 2012	The Swindon (Electoral Changes) Order 2012	Final report September 2011
2 May 2013	The Gloucestershire (Electoral Changes) Order 2012	Final report October 2011
2 May 2013	The Somerset (Electoral Changes) Order 2012	Final report June 2012
7 May 2015	The Cotswold (Electoral Changes) Order 2015	Final report October 2014
7 May 2015	The East Dorset (Electoral Changes) Order 2014	Final report September 2013
7 May 2015	The North Dorset (Electoral Changes) Order 2014	Final report January 2014
7 May 2015	The North Somerset (Electoral Changes) Order 2014	Final report July 2014
7 May 2015	The Poole (Electoral Changes) Order 2015	Final report September 2014
7 May 2015	The Purbeck (Electoral Changes) Order 2013	Final report September 2012
7 May 2015	The South Hams (Electoral Changes) Order 2014	Final report February 2014
7 May 2015	The West Devon (Electoral Changes) Order 2015	Final report October 2014
7 May 2015	The West Dorset (Electoral Changes) Order 2015	Final report April 2014
5 May 2016	The Bristol (Electoral Changes) Order 2015	Final report May 2015
5 May 2016	The Exeter (Electoral Changes) Order 2016	Final report September 2015
5 May 2016	The Gloucester (Electoral Changes) Order 2015	Final report June 2015
5 May 2016	The Stroud (Electoral Changes) Order 2015	Final report June 2015
4 May 2017	The Devon (Electoral Changes) Order 2016	Final report January 2016
4 May 2017	The Dorset (Electoral Changes) Order 2016	Final report September 2015
4 May 2017	The Isles of Scilly (Electoral Changes) Order 2017 (Note: Did not result in any boundary changes, only seat reductions for the existing wards.)	Final report December 2016
2 May 2019	The Bath and North East Somerset (Electoral Changes) Order 2018	Final report August 2018
2 May 2019	The East Devon (Electoral Changes) Order 2017	Final report June 2017
2 May 2019	The Forest of Dean (Electoral Changes) Order 2018	Final report January 2018
2 May 2019	The North Devon (Electoral Changes) Order 2018	Final report May 2018
2 May 2019	The South Gloucestershire (Electoral Changes) Order 2018	Final report January 2018
2 May 2019	The South Somerset (Electoral Changes) Order 2018	Final report May 2018
2 May 2019	The Teignbridge (Electoral Changes) Order 2017	Final report January 2017
2 May 2019	The Tewkesbury (Electoral Changes) Order 2018	Final report October 2017
2 May 2019	The Torbay (Electoral Changes) Order 2018	Final report February 2018
2 May 2019	The Torridge (Electoral Changes) Order 2017	Final report January 2017
6 May 2021	The Cornwall (Electoral Changes) Order 2019	Final report December 2018
6 May 2021	The Wiltshire (Electoral Changes) Order 2020	Final report October 2019
4 May 2023	The Mid Devon (Electoral Changes) Order 2021	Final report January 2021
2 May 2024	The Cheltenham (Electoral Changes) Order 2023	Final report April 2023
1 May 2025	The Gloucestershire (Electoral Changes) Order 2025	Final report March 2024
7 May 2026	The Swindon (Electoral Changes) Order 2025	Final report February 2025

=== Changes resulting from parish council boundary changes ===
These orders were made to subsequent to changes to civil parish boundaries.

Date	Statutory Instrument	Cause
3 May 2007; 4 June 2009	The Cotswold (Electoral Changes) Order 2007	Transfers of areas between Coln St Aldwyns and Hatherop
3 May 2007; 4 June 2009	The North Devon (Parish Electoral Arrangements and Electoral Changes) Order 2007	Transfers of areas between Barnstaple and Landkey
1 May 2008; 4 June 2009; 5 May 2011	The Stroud (Electoral Changes) Order 2008	Transfers of areas between the following parishes: Nailsworth to Minchinhampton; Woodchester to Nailsworth
5 May 2011	The North Somerset (Electoral Changes) Order 2010	Transfers of areas between the following parishes: Banwell to Hutton; Locking to Weston-super-Mare; Weston-super-Mare to Bleadon; Weston-super-Mare to Locking; Weston-super-Mare to Wick St. Lawrence; Wrington to Backwell; Wrington to Winford
5 May 2011; 2 May 2013	The Teignbridge (Electoral Changes) Order 2010	Transfers of areas between Newton Abbot and Abbotskerswell
7 May 2015	The North Devon (Electoral Changes) Order 2012	Transfer of areas from Swimbridge to Chittlehampton
7 May 2015	The Purbeck (Electoral Changes) Order 2015	Transfers of areas between the following parishes: Arne to Wareham Town; Bere Regis to Affpuddle and Turnerspuddle; Corfe Castle to Worth Matravers; Wareham Town to Arne
7 May 2015	The Swindon (Electoral Changes) Order 2015	Transfer of areas from Blunsdon St Andrew to Stratton St Margaret; Transfer of unparished areas to Haydon Wick

== Structural changes ==
Date	Statutory Instrument	LGCE Report(s)
1 April 1996	The Avon (Structural Change) Order 1995	Draft report June 1993 Final report December 1993
1 April 1997	The Dorset (Boroughs of Poole and Bournemouth) (Structural Change) Order 1995	Draft report July 1994 Final report December 1994
1 April 1998	The Wiltshire (Borough of Thamesdown) (Structural Change) Order 1995	Draft report July 1994 Final report December 1994
1 April 1998	The Devon (City of Plymouth and Borough of Torbay) (Structural Change) Order 1996	Draft report July 1994 Final report December 1994
1 April 2009	The Cornwall (Structural Change) Order 2008	
1 April 2009	The Wiltshire (Structural Change) Order 2008	
Revoked by the Local Government Act 2010	The Exeter and Devon (Structural Changes) Order 2010	
1 April 2019	The Bournemouth, Dorset and Poole (Structural Changes) Order 2018	
1 April 2019	The Somerset West and Taunton (Local Government Changes) Order 2018	
1 April 2023	The Somerset (Structural Changes) Order 2022	

Other structural reviews

- Cornwall - Draft report September 1994 Final report January 1995
- Gloucestershire - Draft report September 1994 Final report January 1995
- Exeter - Draft report September 1995 Final report December 1995
- A report on the 1992-1995 Structural Review May 1995
- Overview report of 21 Districts in England September 1995
