= List of boundary changes in the East of England =

Map of the East of England

This is a list of boundary changes occurring in the East of England region of England, since the re-organisation of local government following the passing of the Local Government Act 1972.

== Administrative boundaries ==
=== Initial creation ===
When the Local Government Act 1972 was passed there were still some details left to be decided, the Local Government Boundary Commission for England's first work was to clarify these details.

Date	Statutory Instrument	LGBCE Report
1 February 1973	The English Non-Metropolitan Districts (Definition) Order 1972	Report No. 001: Recommendations for new Districts in the non-Metropolitan Counties November 1972
5 March 1973	The Divided Areas (Boundaries) Order 1973	n/a
1 May 1973	The English Non-Metropolitan Districts (Names) Order 1973	Report No. 002: Names of Non-Metropolitan Districts March 1973

=== Principal Area Boundary Reviews ===
The Local Government Boundary Commission for England (or LGBCE) was established by the Local Government Act 1972 to review the administrative boundaries of every local authority in England. Between 1974 and 1992 they completed a series of Principal Area Boundary Reviews; reviewing the administrative boundaries of local authorities at their request.

Date	Statutory Instrument	Effect	LGBCE Report(s)
1 April 1984	The Basildon and Castle Point (Areas) Order 1984	Changes to the Basildon/Castle Point (both Essex) boundary	Report No. 432: Basildon/Castle Point August 1982
1 April 1985	The Bedfordshire (Areas) Order 1984	Changes to the Mid Bedfordshire/South Bedfordshire (both Bedfordshire) boundary	Report No. 449: South Bedfordshire/Mid Bedfordshire June 1983
1 April 1984	The East Hertfordshire and Stevenage (Areas) Order 1984	Changes to the East Hertfordshire/Stevenage (both Hertfordshire) boundary	Report No. 433: East Hertfordshire/Stevenage September 1982
1 April 1985	The Braintree, Chelmsford and Colchester (Areas) Order 1985	Changes to the: Braintree/Chelmsford (both Essex) boundary; Braintree/Colchester (both Essex) boundary	Report No. 464: Braintree/Colchester/Chelmsford December 1983
1 April 1985	The Dacorum and Three Rivers (Areas) Order 1985	Changes to the Dacorum/Three Rivers (both Hertfordshire) boundary	Report No. 447: Dacorum/Three Rivers June 1983
1 April 1985	The East Hertfordshire and Welwyn Hatfield (Areas) Order 1985	Changes to the East Hertfordshire/Welwyn Hatfield (both Hertfordshire) boundary	Report No. 451: East Hertfordshire/Welwyn Hatfield July 1983
1 April 1986	The Ipswich and Suffolk Coastal (District Boundaries) Order 1985	Changes to the Ipswich/Suffolk Coastal (both Suffolk) boundary	Report No. 474: Suffolk Coastal/Ipswich July 1984
1 April 1987	The Essex (District Boundaries) Order 1986	Changes to the boundaries of: Braintree (Essex); Brentwood (Essex); Epping Forest (Essex); Uttlesford (Essex)	Report No. 497: Epping Forest/Brentwood June 1985; Report No. 498: Uttlesford/Braintree June 1985
1 April 1987	The Hertfordshire (District Boundaries) Order 1986	Changes to the East Hertfordshire/Stevenage (both Hertfordshire) boundary	Report No. 495: East Hertfordshire/Stevenage June 1985
1 April 1988	The Essex (District Boundaries) Order 1987	Changes to the Braintree/Maldon (both Essex) boundary	Report No. 531: Maldon/Braintree December 1986
1 April 1990	The Essex (District Boundaries) Order 1989	Changes to the Epping Forest/Harlow (both Essex) boundary	Report No. 559: Epping Forest/Harlow June 1988

=== Mandatory Reviews of non-Metropolitan Counties, Metropolitan Districts and London Boroughs ===
In 1985 they began the first full administrative review of all non-metropolitan counties. Their reviews of metropolitan counties and Greater London began in 1987 and both reviews were completed in 1992.

Date	Statutory Instrument	Effect	LGBCE Report(s)
1 April 1990	The Essex and Suffolk (County Boundaries) Order 1989	Changes to the: Braintree (Essex)/Babergh (Suffolk) boundary; Braintree (Essex)/St Edmundsbury (Suffolk) boundary; Colchester (Essex)/Babergh (Suffolk) boundary	Report No. 565: Suffolk November 1988
1 April 1989	The Bedfordshire and Hertfordshire (County Boundaries) Order 1989	Changes to the North Hertfordshire (Hertfordshire)/Luton (Bedfordshire) boundary	Report No. 555: Hertfordshire June 1988
1 April 1989	The Cambridgeshire, Essex, Hertfordshire and Lincolnshire (County Boundaries) Order 1989	Changes to the: Uttlesford (Essex)/South Cambridgeshire (Cambridgeshire) boundary; South Cambridgeshire (Cambridgeshire)/North Hertfordshire (Hertfordshire) boundary; Peterborough (Cambridgeshire)/South Holland (Lincolnshire) boundary; Fenland (Cambridgeshire)/South Holland (Lincolnshire) boundary; Peterborough (Cambridgeshire)/South Kesteven (Lincolnshire) boundary	Report No. 546: Cambridgeshire March 1988
1 April 1990	The Cambridgeshire, Norfolk and Suffolk (County Boundaries) Order 1990	Changes to the: Fenland (Cambridgeshire)/King's Lynn and West Norfolk (Norfolk) boundary; Breckland (Norfolk)/Forest Heath (Suffolk) boundary	Report No. 554: Norfolk June 1988
1 April 1991	The Bedfordshire, Buckinghamshire and Cambridgeshire (County Boundaries) Order 1991	Changes to the: Milton Keynes (Buckinghamshire)/Mid Bedfordshire (Bedfordshire) boundary; Huntingdonshire (Cambridgeshire)/North Bedfordshire (Bedfordshire) boundary; North Bedfordshire (Bedfordshire)/Milton Keynes (Buckinghamshire) boundary; South Bedfordshire (Bedfordshire)/Aylesbury Vale (Buckinghamshire) boundary	Report No. 566: Bedfordshire November 1988
1 April 1991	The Buckinghamshire, Hertfordshire, Northamptonshire and Oxfordshire (County Boundaries) Order 1991	Changes to the: South Northamptonshire (Northamptonshire)/Milton Keynes (Buckinghamshire) boundary; Dacorum (Hertfordshire)/Chiltern (Buckinghamshire) boundary; Wycombe (Buckinghamshire)/South Oxfordshire (Oxfordshire) boundary; South Northamptonshire (Northamptonshire)/Aylesbury Vale (Buckinghamshire) boundary; Dacorum (Hertfordshire)/Aylesbury Vale (Buckinghamshire) boundary; Three Rivers (Hertfordshire)/Chiltern (Buckinghamshire) boundary	Report No. 571: Buckinghamshire May 1989
1 April 1994	The Cambridgeshire and Suffolk (County Boundaries) Order 1992	Changes to the East Cambridgeshire (Cambridgeshire)/Forest Heath (Suffolk) boundary	Report No. 608: Suffolk (Newmarket) September 1991
1 April 1993	The Essex and Hertfordshire (County Boundaries) Order 1992	Changes to the: Epping Forest (Essex)/Broxbourne (Hertfordshire) boundary; Epping Forest (Essex)/East Hertfordshire (Hertfordshire) boundary; Harlow (Essex)/East Hertfordshire (Hertfordshire) boundary; Uttlesford (Essex)/East Hertfordshire (Hertfordshire) boundary	Report No. 596: Essex February 1991
1 April 1993	The Greater London and Hertfordshire (County and District Boundaries) Order 1992	Changes to the: Harrow (Greater London)/Hertsmere (Hertfordshire) boundary; Ealing/Harrow (both Greater London) boundary; Harrow/Hillingdon (both Greater London) boundary	Report No. 610: Harrow October 1991
1 April 1993	The Greater London and Hertfordshire (County Boundaries) Order 1992	Changes to the: Barnet (Greater London)/Hertsmere (Hertfordshire) boundary; Harrow (Greater London)/Hertsmere (Hertfordshire) boundary	Report No. 594: Barnet January 1991
1 April 1994	The Essex and Greater London (County and London Borough Boundaries) Order 1993	Changes to the: Waltham Forest/Enfield (both Greater London) boundary; Waltham Forest/Hackney (both Greater London) boundary; Waltham Forest/Haringey (both Greater London) boundary; Waltham Forest (Greater London)/Epping Forest (Essex) boundary; Enfield (Greater London)/Epping Forest (Essex) boundary	Report No. 618: Waltham Forest February 1992
1 April 1994	The Essex and Greater London (County and London Borough Boundaries) (No. 2) Order 1993	Changes to the: Havering/Barking and Dagenham (both Greater London) boundary; Havering (Greater London)/Brentwood (Essex) boundary; Havering (Greater London)/Epping Forest (Essex) boundary; Havering (Greater London)/Thurrock (Essex) boundary	Report No. 654: Havering June 1992
1 April 1995	The Essex and Greater London (County Boundaries) Order 1993	Changes to the Redbridge (Greater London)/Epping Forest (Essex) boundary	Report No. 648: Redbridge May 1992
1 April 1994	The Essex, Greater London and Hertfordshire (County and London Borough Boundaries) Order 1993	Changes to the: Enfield/Barnet (both Greater London) boundary; Enfield (Greater London)/Broxbourne (Hertfordshire) boundary; Enfield (Greater London)/Hertsmere (Hertfordshire) boundary; Enfield (Greater London)/Welwyn Hatfield (Hertfordshire) boundary; Enfield (Greater London)/Epping Forest (Essex) boundary	Report No. 672: Enfield August 1992

Other mandatory meviews of non-metropolitan counties, metropolitan districts and London boroughs

- Report No. 542: Kent December 1987

== Electoral boundaries ==
=== Initial creation ===
When the Local Government Act 1972 was passed there was not sufficient time to draw up proper electoral boundaries for the new county and district councils, so a temporary system was quickly put in place, intended to only be used for the first elections in 1973.

Date	Statutory Instrument
7 June 1973	The County of Bedfordshire (District Wards) Order 1973
12 April 1973	The County of Bedfordshire (Electoral Divisions) Order 1973
7 June 1973	The County of Cambridgeshire (District Wards) Order 1973
12 April 1973	The County of Cambridgeshire (Electoral Divisions) Order 1973
7 June 1973	The County of Essex (District Wards) Order 1973
12 April 1973	The County of Essex (Electoral Divisions) Order 1973
7 June 1973	The County of Hertfordshire (District Wards) Order 1973
12 April 1973	The County of Hertfordshire (Electoral Divisions) Order 1973
7 June 1973	The County of Norfolk (District Wards) Order 1973
12 April 1973	The County of Norfolk (Electoral Divisions) Order 1973
7 June 1973	The County of Suffolk (District Wards) Order 1973
12 April 1973	The County of Suffolk (Electoral Divisions) Order 1973

=== First periodic review ===
The Local Government Boundary Commission for England (or LGBCE) was established by the Local Government Act 1972 to review the electoral boundaries of every local authority in England. In 1974 they began the first full electoral review of all metropolitan and non-metropolitan districts, completing it in July 1980. Their reviews of the county councils were completed in 1984.

Date	Statutory Instrument	LGBCE Report
6 May 1976	The Borough of Broxbourne (Electoral Arrangements) Order 1975	Report No 010: Broxbourne November 1974
6 May 1976	The Borough of Colchester (Electoral Arrangements) Order 1975	Report No. 041: Colchester September 1975
6 May 1976	The Borough of Luton (Electoral Arrangements) Order 1975	Report No. 054: Luton August 1975
6 May 1976	The Borough of Southend-on-Sea (Electoral Arrangements) Order 1975	Report No. 014: Southend-on-Sea March 1975
6 May 1976	The Borough of Uttlesford (Electoral Arrangements) Order 1975	Report No. 021: Uttlesford July 1975
6 May 1976	The Borough of Watford (Electoral Arrangements) Order 1975	Report No. 011: Watford November 1974
6 May 1976	The City of Cambridge (Electoral Arrangements) Order 1975	Report No. 064: City of Cambridge September 1975
6 May 1976	The District of Brentwood (Electoral Arrangements) Order 1975	Report No. 044: Brentwood September 1975
6 May 1976	The District of Chelmsford (Electoral Arrangements) Order 1975	Report No. 049: Chelmsford August 1975
6 May 1976	The District of Fenland (Electoral Arrangements) Order 1975	Report No. 056: Fenland August 1975
6 May 1976	The District of Harlow (Electoral Arrangements) Order 1975	Report No. 060: Harlow September 1975
6 May 1976	The District of Rochford (Electoral Arrangements) Order 1975	Report No. 025: Rochford June 1975
6 May 1976	The District of South Bedfordshire (Electoral Arrangements) Order 1975	Report No. 057: South Bedfordshire August 1975
6 May 1976	The District of South Cambridgeshire (Electoral Arrangements) Order 1975	Report No. 063: South Cambridgeshire August 1975
6 May 1976	The District of Tendring (Electoral Arrangements) Order 1975	Report No. 016: Tendring May 1975
6 May 1976	The District of Three Rivers (Electoral Arrangements) Order 1975	Report No. 066: Three Rivers October 1975
6 May 1976	The Borough of Hertsmere (Electoral Arrangements) Order 1976	Report No. 121: Hertsmere December 1975
3 May 1979	The Borough of Stevenage (Electoral Arrangements) Order 1976	Report No. 146: Stevenage February 1976
3 May 1979	The Borough of Thurrock (Electoral Arrangements) Order 1976	Report No. 140: Thurrock January 1976
6 May 1976	The City of Peterborough (Electoral Arrangements) Order 1976	Report No. 086: Peterborough November 1975
3 May 1979	The District of Babergh (Electoral Arrangements) Order 1976	Report No. 161: Babergh August 1976
3 May 1979	The District of Braintree (Electoral Arrangements) Order 1976	Report No. 132: Braintree January 1976
3 May 1979	The District of Castle Point (Electoral Arrangements) Order 1976	Report No. 137: Castle Point January 1976
3 May 1979	The District of Dacorum (Electoral Arrangements) Order 1976	Report No. 117: Dacorum December 1975
3 May 1979	The District of East Hertfordshire (Electoral Arrangements) Order 1976	Report No. 149: East Hertfordshire May 1976
6 May 1976	The District of Huntingdon (Electoral Arrangements) Order 1976	Report No. 142: Huntingdon January 1976
3 May 1979	The District of Maldon (Electoral Arrangements) Order 1976	Report No. 089: Maldon November 1975
3 May 1979	The District of Mid Bedfordshire (Electoral Arrangements) Order 1976	Report No. 133: Mid Bedfordshire January 1976
6 May 1976	The District of Welwyn Hatfield (Electoral Arrangements) Order 1976	Report No. 068: Welwyn Hatfield October 1975
3 May 1979	The City of Norwich (Electoral Arrangements) Order 1977	Report No. 204: Norwich April 1977
3 May 1979	The District of Broadland (Electoral Arrangements) Order 1977	Report No. 190: Broadland March 1977
3 May 1979	The District of Epping Forest (Electoral Arrangements) Order 1977	Report No. 147: Epping Forest March 1976
3 May 1979	The District of North Hertfordshire (Electoral Arrangements) Order 1977	Report No. 173: North Hertfordshire November 1976
3 May 1979	The District of South Norfolk (Electoral Arrangements) Order 1977	Report No. 172: South Norfolk November 1976
3 May 1979	The Borough of Ipswich (Electoral Arrangements) Order 1978	Report No. 280: Ipswich January 1978
3 May 1979	The Borough of St Edmundsbury (Electoral Arrangements) Order 1978	Report No. 279: St Edmundsbury February 1978
3 May 1979	The City of St Albans (Electoral Arrangements) Order 1978	Report No. 262: St Albans November 1977
3 May 1979	The District of Basildon (Electoral Arrangements) Order 1978	Report No. 231: Basildon August 1977
3 May 1979	The District of Breckland (Electoral Arrangements) Order 1978	Report No. 283: Breckland August 1978
3 May 1979	The District of Forest Heath (Electoral Arrangements) Order 1978	Report No. 291: Forest Heath November 1978
3 May 1979	The District of Mid Suffolk (Electoral Arrangements) Order 1978	Report No. 236: Mid Suffolk August 1977
3 May 1979	The District of North Norfolk (Electoral Arrangements) Order 1978	Report No. 266: North Norfolk January 1978
1 May 1980	The Borough of Great Yarmouth (Electoral Arrangements) Order 1979	Report No. 314: Great Yarmouth January 1979
5 May 1983	The Borough of West Norfolk (Electoral Arrangements) Order 1979	Report No. 323: West Norfolk April 1979
5 May 1983	The District of North Bedfordshire (Electoral Arrangements) Order 1979	Report No. 342: North Bedfordshire June 1979
7 May 1981	The County of Hertfordshire (Electoral Arrangements) Order 1980	Report No. 390: Hertfordshire July 1980
5 May 1983	The District of East Cambridgeshire (Electoral Arrangements) Order 1980	Report No. 389: East Cambridgeshire July 1980
5 May 1983	The District of Suffolk Coastal (Electoral Arrangements) Order 1980	Report No. 365: Suffolk Coastal November 1979
5 May 1983	The District of Waveney (Electoral Arrangements) Order 1980	Report No. 367: Waveney December 1979
7 May 1981	The County of Essex (Electoral Arrangements) Order 1981	Report No. 401: Essex November 1980
2 May 1985	The County of Cambridgeshire (Electoral Arrangements) Order 1984	Report No. 460: Cambridgeshire December 1983
2 May 1985	The County of Norfolk (Electoral Arrangements) Order 1984	Report No. 472: Norfolk June 1984
2 May 1985	The County of Suffolk (Electoral Arrangements) Order 1984	Report No. 429: Suffolk June 1982
2 May 1985	The County of Bedfordshire (Electoral Arrangements) Order 1985	Report No. 462: Bedfordshire January 1984

=== Further electoral reviews by the LGBCE ===
Local authorities could request a further review if they felt that there were changes in circumstances since the initial review. The LGBCE would only approve this if they felt it was appropriate because of major changes in the size or distribution of the electorate.

Date	Statutory Instrument	LGBCE Report
7 May 1987	The Borough of Chelmsford (Electoral Arrangements) Order 1987	Report No. 529: Chelmsford December 1986
3 May 1990	The Borough of Colchester (Electoral Arrangements) Order 1989	Report No. 575: Colchester May 1989
2 May 1991	The District of Welwyn Hatfield (Electoral Arrangements) Order 1991	Report No. 576: Welwyn Hatfield June 1989

=== Second periodic review ===
The Local Government Act 1992 established the Local Government Commission for England (or LGCE) as the successor to the LGBCE. In 1996 they began the second full electoral review of English local authorities. On 1 April 2002 the Boundary Committee for England (or BCfE) took over the functions of the LGBCE and carried on the review, completing it in 2004.

Date	Statutory Instrument	LGCE/BCfE Report(s)
1 May 1997	The Borough of Thurrock (Electoral Changes) Order 1997	Draft report 3 September 1996 Final report 6 December 1996
1 May 1997	The City of Peterborough (Parishes and Electoral Changes) Order 1997	Draft report 3 September 1996 Final report 6 December 1996
6 May 1999	The Borough of Broxbourne (Electoral Changes) Order 1998	Draft report July 1997 Final report February 1998
6 May 1999	The Borough of Dacorum (Electoral Changes) Order 1998	Draft report August 1997 Final report February 1998
6 May 1999	The Borough of Hertsmere (Electoral Changes) Order 1998	Draft report August 1997 Final report February 1998
6 May 1999	The Borough of Stevenage (Electoral Changes) Order 1998	Draft report August 1997 Final report February 1998
6 May 1999	The Borough of Watford (Electoral Changes) Order 1998	Draft report July 1997 Final report February 1998
6 May 1999	The City of St Albans (Electoral Changes) Order 1998	Draft report July 1997 Final report February 1998
6 May 1999	The District of East Hertfordshire (Electoral Changes) Order 1998	Draft report August 1997 Final report February 1998
6 May 1999	The District of North Hertfordshire (Electoral Changes) Order 1998	Draft report August 1997 Final report February 1998
6 May 1999	The District of Three Rivers (Parishes and Electoral Changes) Order 1998	Draft report August 1997 Final report February 1998
6 May 1999	The District of Welwyn Hatfield (Electoral Changes) Order 1998	Draft report July 1997 Final report February 1998
7 June 2001	The Borough of Southend-on-Sea (Electoral Changes) Order 2000	Draft report 25 May 1999 Final report 2 November 1999
7 June 2001	The County of Hertfordshire (Electoral Changes) Order 2000	Draft report May 1999 Final report November 1999
2 May 2002	The Borough of Bedford (Electoral Changes) Order 2001	Draft report 20 February 2001 Final report 7 August 2001
2 May 2002	The Borough of Brentwood (Electoral Changes) Order 2001	Draft report 20 June 2000 Final report 28 November 2000
1 May 2003	The Borough of Castle Point (Electoral Changes) Order 2001	Draft report 16 May 2000 Final report 28 November 2000
2 May 2002	The Borough of Colchester (Electoral Changes) Order 2001	Draft report 20 June 2000 Final report 28 November 2000
2 May 2002	The Borough of Ipswich (Electoral Changes) Order 2001	Draft report 9 January 2001 Final report 26 June 2001
1 May 2003	The Borough of St Edmundsbury (Electoral Changes) Order 2001	Draft report 9 January 2001 Final report 26 June 2001
1 May 2003	The District of Babergh (Electoral Changes) Order 2001; The District of Babergh (Electoral Changes) (Amendment) Order 2002	Draft report 9 January 2001 Final report 26 June 2001
2 May 2002	The District of Basildon (Electoral Changes) Order 2001	Draft report 20 June 2000 Final report 28 November 2000
1 May 2003	The District of Braintree (Electoral Changes) Order 2001	Draft report 16 May 2000 Final report 28 November 2000
1 May 2003	The District of Chelmsford (Electoral Changes) Order 2001	Draft report 16 May 2000 Final report 28 November 2000
2 May 2002	The District of Epping Forest (Electoral Changes) Order 2001; The District of Epping Forest (Electoral Changes) (Amendment) Order 2002	Draft report 20 June 2000 Final report 28 November 2000
1 May 2003	The District of Forest Heath (Electoral Changes) Order 2001	Draft report 9 January 2001 Final report 26 June 2001
2 May 2002	The District of Harlow (Electoral Changes) Order 2001	Draft report 20 June 2000 Final report 28 November 2000
1 May 2003	The District of Maldon (Electoral Changes) Order 2001	Draft report 20 June 2000 Final report 28 November 2000
1 May 2003	The District of Mid Bedfordshire (Electoral Changes) Order 2001	Draft report 20 February 2001 Final report 7 August 2001
1 May 2003	The District of Mid Suffolk (Electoral Changes) Order 2001	Draft report 9 January 2001 Final report 26 June 2001
2 May 2002	The District of Rochford (Electoral Changes) Order 2001	Draft report 20 June 2000 Further draft report 28 November 2000; Final report 19 March 2001
2 May 2002	The District of South Bedfordshire (Electoral Changes) Order 2001	Draft report 20 February 2001 Final report 7 August 2001
1 May 2003	The District of Suffolk Coastal (Electoral Changes) Order 2001	Draft report 9 January 2001 Final report 26 June 2001
1 May 2003	The District of Tendring (Electoral Changes) Order 2001	Draft report 20 June 2000 Final report 28 November 2000
1 May 2003	The District of Uttlesford (Electoral Changes) Order 2001	Draft report 16 May 2000 Final report 28 November 2000
2 May 2002	The District of Waveney (Electoral Changes) Order 2001; The District of Waveney (Electoral Changes) (Amendment) Order 2002	Draft report 9 January 2001 Final report 26 June 2001
10 June 2004	The Borough of Great Yarmouth (Electoral Changes) Order 2002	Draft report 26 March 2002 Final report 30 July 2002
1 May 2003	The Borough of King's Lynn and West Norfolk (Electoral Changes) Order 2002	Draft report 26 March 2002 Final report 30 July 2002
1 May 2003	The Borough of Luton (Electoral Changes) Order 2002	Draft report May 2001 Final report November 2001
10 June 2004	The Borough of Thurrock (Electoral Changes) Order 2002; The Borough of Thurrock (Electoral Changes) (Amendment) Order 2003	Draft report 20 June 2000 Final report 4 December 2000
10 June 2004	The City of Cambridge (Electoral Changes) Order 2002	Draft report 27 November 2001 Final report 23 April 2002
10 June 2004	The City of Norwich (Electoral Changes) Order 2002	Draft report 26 March 2002 Final report 30 July 2002
1 May 2003	The District of Breckland (Electoral Changes) Order 2002	Draft report 26 March 2002 Final report 30 July 2002
1 May 2003	The District of East Cambridgeshire (Electoral Changes) Order 2002	Draft report 27 November 2001 Final report 23 April 2002
1 May 2003	The District of Fenland (Electoral Changes) Order 2002	Draft report 27 November 2001 Final report 23 April 2002
10 June 2004	The District of Huntingdonshire (Electoral Changes) Order 2002	Draft report 27 November 2001 Final report 23 April 2002
10 June 2004	The District of South Cambridgeshire (Electoral Changes) Order 2002; The District of South Cambridgeshire (Electoral Changes) (Amendment) Order 2003	Draft report 27 November 2001 Final report 23 April 2002
1 May 2003	The District of South Norfolk (Electoral Changes) Order 2002	Draft report 26 March 2002 Final report 30 July 2002
10 June 2004	The City of Peterborough (Electoral Changes) Order 2003; The City of Peterborough (Electoral Changes) (Amendment) Order 2004	Draft report 26 February 2002 Final report 9 July 2002
10 June 2004	The District of Broadland (Electoral Changes) Order 2003	Draft report 26 March 2002 Final report 30 July 2002
1 May 2003	The District of North Norfolk (Electoral Changes) Order 2003	Draft report 26 March 2002 Final report 30 July 2002
5 May 2005	The County of Bedfordshire (Electoral Changes) Order 2004	Draft report 13 January 2004 Final report 27 July 2004
5 May 2005	The County of Essex (Electoral Changes) Order 2004	Draft report 12 August 2003 Final report 27 April 2004
5 May 2005	The County of Suffolk (Electoral Changes) Order 2004	Draft report 13 January 2004 Final report 27 July 2004
5 May 2005	The County of Cambridgeshire (Electoral Changes) Order 2005	Draft report 24 February 2004 Final report 14 September 2004
5 May 2005	The County of Norfolk (Electoral Changes) Order 2005	Draft report 24 February 2004 Further draft report 29 June 2004; Final report 12 October 2004

=== Further electoral reviews by the BCfE ===
Date	Statutory Instrument	BCfE Report(s)
3 May 2007	The District of North Hertfordshire (Electoral Changes) Order 2006	Draft report June 2005 Final report May 2006
3 May 2007	The Borough of Dacorum (Electoral Changes) Order 2007	Draft report November 2005 Final report August 2006
1 May 2008	The Borough of Welwyn Hatfield (Electoral Changes) Order 2008	Draft report November 2006 Final report June 2007

=== Further electoral reviews by the LGBCE ===
The Local Government Boundary Commission for England (or LGBCE) was established by the Local Democracy, Economic Development and Construction Act 2009 on 1 April 2010 as the successor to the BCfE. It continues to review the electoral arrangements of English local authorities on an 'as and when' basis.

Date	Statutory Instrument	LGBCE Report(s)
5 May 2011	The Bedford (Electoral Changes) Order 2011	Final report July 2010
5 May 2011	The Central Bedfordshire (Electoral Changes) Order 2011	Final report October 2010
3 May 2012	The Broxbourne (Electoral Changes) Order 2012	Final report October 2011
22 May 2014	The Three Rivers (Electoral Changes) Order 2014	Final report October 2013
7 May 2015	The Braintree (Electoral Changes) Order 2014	Final report July 2014
7 May 2015	The Breckland (Electoral Changes) Order 2014	Final report July 2014
7 May 2015	The Fenland (Electoral Changes) Order 2014	Final report March 2013
7 May 2015	The Suffolk Coastal (Electoral Changes) Order 2014	Final report April 2014
7 May 2015	The Uttlesford (Electoral Changes) Order 2014	Final report October 2013
5 May 2016	The Colchester (Electoral Changes) Order 2015	Final report March 2015
5 May 2016	The Peterborough (Electoral Changes) Order 2015	Final report January 2015
5 May 2016	The Rochford (Electoral Changes) Order 2015	Final report May 2015
5 May 2016	The Watford (Electoral Changes) Order 2016	Final report December 2015
5 May 2016	The Welwyn Hatfield (Electoral Changes) Order 2016	Final report December 2015
4 May 2017	The Cambridgeshire (Electoral Changes) Order 2016	Final report September 2016
4 May 2017	The Hertfordshire (Electoral Changes) Order 2015	Final report May 2015
3 May 2018	The Huntingdonshire (Electoral Changes) Order 2017	Final report November 2016
3 May 2018	The South Cambridgeshire (Electoral Changes) Order 2017	Final report October 2016
2 May 2019	The Babergh (Electoral Changes) Order 2018	Final report August 2018
2 May 2019	The East Cambridgeshire (Electoral Changes) Order 2016	Final report September 2016
2 May 2019	The Hertsmere (Electoral Changes) Order 2018	Final report December 2017
2 May 2019	The King's Lynn and West Norfolk (Electoral Changes) Order 2018	Final report April 2018
2 May 2019	The Mid Suffolk (Electoral Changes) Order 2018	Final report August 2018
2 May 2019	The North Norfolk (Electoral Changes) Order 2017	Final report April 2017
2 May 2019	The Norwich (Electoral Changes) Order 2019	Final report November 2018
2 May 2019	The Tendring (Electoral Changes) Order 2017	Final report July 2017
6 May 2021	The Cambridge (Electoral Changes) Order 2019	Final report February 2019
5 May 2022	The St Albans (Electoral Changes) Order 2021	Final report December 2020
4 May 2023	The Bedford (Electoral Changes) Order 2022	Final report August 2021
4 May 2023	The Central Bedfordshire (Electoral Changes) Order 2021	Final report January 2021
4 May 2023	The East Hertfordshire (Electoral Changes) Order 2023	Final report August 2022
4 May 2023	The Fenland (Electoral Changes) Order 2023	Final report September 2022
4 May 2023	The Luton (Electoral Changes) Order 2022	Final report January 2022
2 May 2024	The Basildon (Electoral Changes) Order 2023	Final report March 2023
2 May 2024	The Brentwood (Electoral Changes) Order 2023	Final report March 2023
2 May 2024	The Castle Point (Electoral Changes) Order 2023	Final report March 2023
2 May 2024	The Epping Forest (Electoral Changes) Order 2023	Final report March 2023
2 May 2024	The Harlow (Electoral Changes) Order 2023	Final report April 2023
2 May 2024	The North Hertfordshire (Electoral Changes) Order 2023	Final report May 2023
2 May 2024	The Stevenage (Electoral Changes) Order 2023	Final report November 2022
7 May 2026	The Essex (Electoral Changes) Order 2024	Final report July 2024
7 May 2026	The Norfolk (Electoral Changes) Order 2021	Final report May 2021
7 May 2026	The Suffolk (Electoral Changes) Order 2022	Final report September 2021
7 May 2026	The Thurrock (Electoral Changes) Order 2025	Final report December 2024

=== Changes resulting from parish council boundary changes ===
These orders were made to subsequent to changes to civil parish boundaries.

Date	Statutory Instrument	Cause
3 May 2007	The Peterborough (Parish Electoral Arrangements and Electoral Changes) Order 2007	Changes to the boundaries of Eye, Orton Longueville, and Orton Waterville
3 May 2007; 4 June 2009	The St Albans (Parish Electoral Arrangements and Electoral Changes) Order 2007	Transfer of areas from Redbourn to St Michael; Changes to parish wards in Harpenden
3 May 2007 & 4 June 2009	The South Norfolk (Parish Electoral Arrangements and Electoral Changes) Order 2007	Changes to the boundaries of Alburgh, Bressingham, Bunwell, Carleton Rode, Chedgrave, Colney, Cringleford, Diss, East Carleton, Ellingham, Forncett, Geldeston, Heckingham, Hethersett, Ketteringham, Langley with Hardley, Little Melton, Loddon, Redenhall with Harleston, Roydon, Starston, Swardeston, Tacolneston, and Wymondham; Creation of Heywood
1 May 2008; 4 June 2009	The South Cambridgeshire (Electoral Changes) Order 2008	Changes to the boundaries of Cambourne, Caxton, and Knapwell
4 June 2009; 5 May 2011	The Uttlesford (Electoral Changes) Order 2008	Transfers of areas between the following parishes: Birchanger to Great Hallingbury; Birchanger to Stansted Mountfitchet; Hatfield Broad Oak to Takeley; Little Chesterford to Saffron Walden; Stansted Mountfitchet to Birchanger; Stansted Mountfitchet to Great Hallingbury; Stansted Mountfitchet to Takeley; Takeley to Hatfield Broad Oak
3 May 2012; 2 May 2013	The Epping Forest (Electoral Changes) Order 2011	Transfers of areas between the following parishes: High Laver to Matching; Little Laver to Matching
2 May 2013; 7 May 2015	The King's Lynn and West Norfolk (Electoral Changes) Order 2012; The King's Lynn and West Norfolk (Electoral Changes) Order 2013	Transfers of areas between the following parishes: North Wootton to Castle Rising; Terrington St Clement to Walpole Cross Keys; Transfer of unparished area to South Wootton 2012 order revoked by the 2013 order.

== Structural changes ==
Date	Statutory Instrument	LGCE Report(s)
1 April 1997	The Bedfordshire (Borough of Luton) (Structural Change) Order 1995	Draft report June 1994 Final report October 1994
1 April 1998	The Essex (Boroughs of Colchester, Southend-on-Sea and Thurrock and District of Tendring) (Structural, Boundary and Electoral Changes) Order 1996	Draft report July 1994 Final report December 1994; Draft report September 1995 Final report December 1995
1 April 1998	The Cambridgeshire (City of Peterborough) (Structural, Boundary and Electoral Changes) Order 1996	Draft report June 1994 Final report October 1994; Draft report September 1995 Final report December 1995
1 April 2009	The Bedfordshire (Structural Changes) Order 2008	
Revoked by the Local Government Act 2010	The Norwich and Norfolk (Structural Changes) Order 2010	
1 April 2019	The East Suffolk (Local Government Changes) Order 2018	
1 April 2019	The West Suffolk (Local Government Changes) Order 2018	

Other structural reviews

- Norfolk - Draft report July 1994 Final report December 1994
- Suffolk - Draft report July 1994 Final report December 1994
- Hertfordshire - Draft report September 1994 Final report January 1995
- Norwich - Draft report September 1995 Final report December 1995
- A report on the 1992-1995 Structural Review May 1995
- Overview report of 21 Districts in England September 1995
