= LGC =

LGC may refer to:

== Businesses and organisations ==
- LGC Ltd, a British biotech firm
- Landmark Graphics Corporation, an oilfield subsidiary of Halliburton
- Liberal Gun Club, United States
- Local Government Commission (disambiguation), in several jurisdictions
- London Gliding Club, British flying club
- LG Chemistry

== Education ==
- Learner-generated context
- Linton Global College, Hannam University, South Korea
- Lowcountry Graduate Center, North Charleston, South Carolina, US

== Law ==
- Local Government Code, a Philippine administrative legal document

== Places ==
- LaGrange Callaway Airport, Georgia, US (IATA:LGC)
- Letchworth Garden City, Hertfordshire, England

== Publications ==
- Local Government Chronicle, a British weekly magazine (launched 1855)
