= List of boundary changes in North East England =

Map of North East England

This is a list of internal boundary changes to the 1993-created North East England, from before the region with the Local Government Act 1972 to present day.

== Administrative boundaries ==
=== Initial creation ===
When the Local Government Act 1972 was passed there were still some details left to be decided, the Local Government Boundary Commission for England's first work was to clarify these details.

Date	Statutory Instrument	LGBCE Report
1 February 1973	The English Non-Metropolitan Districts (Definition) Order 1972	Report No. 001: Recommendations for new Districts in the non-Metropolitan Counties November 1972
5 March 1973	The Divided Areas (Boundaries) Order 1973	n/a
1 May 1973	The English Non-Metropolitan Districts (Names) Order 1973	Report No. 002: Names of Non-Metropolitan Districts March 1973
1 April 1973	The Metropolitan Districts (Names) Order 1973	n/a

=== Principal Area Boundary Reviews ===
The Local Government Boundary Commission for England (or LGBCE) was established by the Local Government Act 1972 to review the administrative boundaries of every local authority in England. Between 1974 and 1992 they completed a series of Principal Area Boundary Reviews; reviewing the administrative boundaries of local authorities at their request.

Date	Statutory Instrument	Effect	LGBCE Report(s)
1 April 1976	The Darlington and Sedgefield (Areas) Order 1976	Changes to the Darlington/Sedgefield (both Durham) boundary	Report No. 9: Aycliffe New Town (Darlington/Sedgefield) November 1974
1 April 1983	The Cleveland and Durham (Areas) Order 1982	Changes to the Sedgefield (Durham)/Stockton-on-Tees (Cleveland) boundary	Report No. 416: Sedgefield/Stockton-on-Tees July 1981
1 April 1985	The Durham and Easington (Areas) Order 1985	Changes to the Durham/Easington (both Durham) boundary	Report No. 459: Easington/Durham November 1983
1 April 1986	The Castle Morpeth and Tynedale (District Boundaries) Order 1985	Changes to the Castle Morpeth/Tynedale (both Northumberland) boundary	Report No. 491: Castle Morpeth/Tynedale January 1985
1 April 1986	The Durham (District Boundaries) Order 1986	Changes to the: Chester-le-Street/Durham (both Durham) boundary; Durham/Sedgefield (both Durham) boundary	Report No. 475: Durham/Sedgefield July 1984; Report No. 499: Chester-le-Street/Durham June 1985

=== Mandatory Reviews of non-Metropolitan Counties, Metropolitan Districts and London Boroughs ===
In 1985 they began the first full administrative review of all non-metropolitan counties. Their reviews of metropolitan counties and Greater London began in 1987 and both reviews were completed in 1992.

Date	Statutory Instrument	Effect	LGBCE Report(s)
1 April 1989	The Cleveland and Durham (County Boundaries) Order 1988	Changes to the Sedgefield (Durham)/Stockton-on-Tees (Cleveland) boundary	Report No. 551: Cleveland May 1988
1 April 1990	The Cumbria, Northumberland and North Yorkshire (County Boundaries) Order 1989	Changes to the: Carlisle (Cumbria)/Tynedale (Northumberland) boundary; Eden (Cumbria)/Richmondshire (North Yorkshire) boundary	Report No. 557: Cumbria July 1988
1 April 1991	The Durham and North Yorkshire (County Boundaries) Order 1991	Changes to the: Teesdale (Durham)/Richmondshire (North Yorkshire) boundary; Darlington (Durham)/Richmondshire (North Yorkshire) boundary; Darlington (Durham)/Hambleton (North Yorkshire) boundary	Report No. 569: North Yorkshire December 1988
1 April 1994	The Durham and Tyne and Wear (County and District Boundaries) Order 1992; The Durham and Tyne and Wear (County and District Boundaries) (Variation) Order 1993	Changes to the: Chester-le-Street (Durham)/Gateshead (Tyne and Wear) boundary; Chester-le-Street (Durham)/Sunderland (Tyne and Wear) boundary; Durham (Durham)/Sunderland (Tyne and Wear) boundary; Easington (Durham)/Sunderland (Tyne and Wear) boundary; Gateshead/Sunderland (both Tyne and Wear) boundary; Gateshead/South Tyneside (both Tyne and Wear) boundary; North Tyneside/South Tyneside (both Tyne and Wear) boundary; South Tyneside/Sunderland (both Tyne and Wear) boundary	Report No. 643: South Tyneside June 1992; Report No. 646: Sunderland June 1992
1 April 1994	The Durham, Northumberland and Tyne and Wear (County and District Boundaries) Order 1992	Changes to the: Derwentside (Durham)/Gateshead (Tyne and Wear) boundary; Chester-le-Street (Durham)/Gateshead (Tyne and Wear) boundary; Castle Morpeth (Northumberland)/Gateshead (Tyne and Wear) boundary; Castle Morpeth (Northumberland)/Newcastle upon Tyne (Tyne and Wear) boundary; Tynedale (Northumberland)/Gateshead (Tyne and Wear) boundary; Gateshead/Newcastle upon Tyne (both Tyne and Wear) boundary	Report No. 640: Gateshead June 1992; Report No. 645: Newcastle June 1992
1 April 1994	The Northumberland and Tyne and Wear (County and District Boundaries) Order 1992	Changes to the: Blyth Valley (Northumberland)/North Tyneside (Tyne and Wear) boundary; Castle Morpeth (Northumberland)/Newcastle upon Tyne (Tyne and Wear) boundary; Castle Morpeth (Northumberland)/North Tyneside (Tyne and Wear) boundary; Newcastle upon Tyne/North Tyneside (both Tyne and Wear) boundary	Report No. 644: North Tyneside June 1992

Other mandatory meviews of non-metropolitan counties, metropolitan districts and London boroughs

- Report No. 553: Northumberland July 1988
- Report No. 607: North Yorkshire (Further Review) August 1991

== Electoral boundaries ==
=== Initial creation ===
When the Local Government Act 1972 was passed there was not sufficient time to draw up proper electoral boundaries for the new county and district councils, so a temporary system was quickly put in place, intended to only be used for the first elections in 1973.

Date	Statutory Instrument
7 June 1973	The County of Cleveland (District Wards) Order 1973
12 April 1973	The County of Cleveland (Electoral Divisions) Order 1973
7 June 1973	The County of Durham (District Wards) Order 1973
12 April 1973	The County of Durham (Electoral Divisions) Order 1973
12 April 1973	The County of Northumberland (Electoral Divisions) Order 1973

=== First periodic review ===
The Local Government Boundary Commission for England (or LGBCE) was established by the Local Government Act 1972 to review the electoral boundaries of every local authority in England. In 1974 they began the first full electoral review of all metropolitan and non-metropolitan districts, completing it in July 1980. Their reviews of the county councils were completed in 1984.

Date	Statutory Instrument	LGBCE Report
6 May 1976	The Borough of Berwick-upon-Tweed (Electoral Arrangements) Order 1975	Report No. 072: Berwick-upon-Tweed October 1975
6 May 1976	The Borough of Castle Morpeth (Electoral Arrangements) Order 1975	Report No. 015: Castle Morpeth March 1975
6 May 1976	The Borough of Hartlepool (Electoral Arrangements) Order 1975	Report No. 042: Hartlepool September 1975
6 May 1976	The Borough of Langbaurgh (Electoral Arrangements) Order 1975	Report No. 043: Langbaurgh September 1975
6 May 1976	The District of Wansbeck (Electoral Arrangements) Order 1975	Report No. 078: Wansbeck October 1975
3 May 1979	The Borough of Blyth Valley (Electoral Arrangements) Order 1976	Report No. 091: Blyth Valley October 1975
3 May 1979	The Borough of Darlington (Electoral Arrangements) Order 1976	Report No. 136: Darlington February 1976
3 May 1979	The Borough of Middlesbrough (Electoral Arrangements) Order 1976	Report No. 087: Middlesbrough November 1975
3 May 1979	The Borough of Stockton-on-Tees (Electoral Arrangements) Order 1976	Report No. 097: Stockton-on-Tees November 1975
3 May 1979	The District of Alnwick (Electoral Arrangements) Order 1976	Report No. 090: Alnwick October 1975
3 May 1979	The District of Chester-le-Street (Electoral Arrangements) Order 1976	Report No. 157: Chester-le-Street August 1976
6 May 1976	The District of Tynedale (Electoral Arrangements) Order 1976	Report No. 077: Tynedale October 1975
3 May 1979	The City of Durham (Electoral Arrangements) Order 1978	Report No. 227: City of Durham July 1977
3 May 1979	The District of Derwentside (Electoral Arrangements) Order 1978	Report No. 162: Derwentside August 1976
3 May 1979	The District of Easington (Electoral Arrangements) Order 1978	Report No. 299: Easington October 1978
5 May 1983	The District of Sedgefield (Electoral Arrangements) Order 1979	Report No. 276: Sedgefield February 1978
5 May 1983	The District of Teesdale (Electoral Arrangements) Order 1979	Report No. 311: Teesdale December 1978
5 May 1983	The District of Wear Valley (Electoral Arrangements) Order 1979	Report No. 176: Wear Valley November 1976
6 May 1982	The Borough of Gateshead (Electoral Arrangements) Order 1980	Report No. 358: Gateshead October 1979
6 May 1982	The Borough of North Tyneside (Electoral Arrangements) Order 1980	Report No. 350: North Tyneside October 1979
6 May 1982	The Borough of South Tyneside (Electoral Arrangements) Order 1980	Report No. 355: South Tyneside October 1979
6 May 1982	The Borough of Sunderland (Electoral Arrangements) Order 1980	Report No. 359: Sunderland October 1979
6 May 1982	The City of Newcastle upon Tyne (Electoral Arrangements) Order 1980	Report No. 357: Newcastle-upon-Tyne October 1979
7 May 1981	The County of Northumberland (Electoral Arrangements) Order 1980	Report No. 370: Northumberland January 1980
7 May 1981	The County of Durham (Electoral Arrangements) Order 1981	Report No. 406: Durham December 1980
2 May 1985	The County of Cleveland (Electoral Arrangements) Order 1985	Report No. 479: Cleveland September 1984

=== Further electoral reviews by the LGBCE ===
Local authorities could request a further review if they felt that there were changes in circumstances since the initial review. The LGBCE would only approve this if they felt it was appropriate because of major changes in the size or distribution of the electorate.

Date	Statutory Instrument	LGBCE Report
2 May 1991	The Borough of Blyth Valley (Electoral Arrangements) Order 1988	Report No. 527: Blyth Valley December 1986
2 May 1991	The Borough of Langbaurgh (Electoral Arrangements) Order 1991	Report No. 595: Langbaurgh December 1990

=== Second periodic review ===
The Local Government Act 1992 established the Local Government Commission for England (or LGCE) as the successor to the LGBCE. In 1996 they began the second full electoral review of English local authorities. On 1 April 2002 the Boundary Committee for England (or BCfE) took over the functions of the LGBCE and carried on the review, completing it in 2004.

Date	Statutory Instrument	LGCE/BCfE Report(s)
6 May 1999	The Borough of Berwick-upon-Tweed (Electoral Changes) Order 1998	Draft report October 1996 Final report 25 March 1997
6 May 1999	The Borough of Blyth Valley (Electoral Changes) Order 1998	Draft report October 1996 Final report 25 March 1997
6 May 1999	The Borough of Castle Morpeth (Electoral Changes) Order 1998	Draft report October 1996 Final report 25 March 1997
6 May 1999	The District of Alnwick (Electoral Changes) Order 1998	Draft report October 1996 Final report 25 March 1997
6 May 1999	The District of Tynedale (Electoral Changes) Order 1998	Draft report October 1996 Final report 25 March 1997
6 May 1999	The District of Wansbeck (Electoral Changes) Order 1998	Draft report October 1996 Final report 25 March 1997
1 May 2003	The Borough of Sedgefield (Electoral Changes) Order 1999	Draft report June 1998 Final report October 1998
1 May 2003	The City of Durham (Electoral Changes) Order 1999	Draft report June 1998 Final report October 1998
1 May 2003	The District of Chester-le-Street (Electoral Changes) Order 1999	Draft report June 1998 Final report October 1998
1 May 2003	The District of Derwentside (Electoral Changes) Order 1999	Draft report April 1998 Final report October 1998
1 May 2003	The District of Easington (Electoral Changes) Order 1999	Draft report April 1998 Final report October 1998
1 May 2003	The District of Teesdale (Electoral Changes) Order 1999	Draft report June 1998 Final report October 1998
1 May 2003	The District of Wear Valley (Electoral Changes) Order 1999	Draft report June 1998 Final report October 1998
7 June 2001	The County of Northumberland (Electoral Changes) Order 2000	Draft report 11 May 1999 Final report 2 November 1999
1 May 2003	The Borough of Darlington (Electoral Changes) Order 2001	Draft report 12 December 2000 Final report 15 May 2001
10 June 2004	The Borough of Hartlepool (Electoral Changes) Order 2003	Draft report 14 May 2002 Final report 21 January 2003
1 May 2003	The Borough of Middlesbrough (Electoral Changes) Order 2003	Draft report 14 May 2002 Final report 15 October 2002
1 May 2003	The Borough of Redcar and Cleveland (Electoral Changes) Order 2003	Draft report 14 May 2002 Final report 15 October 2002
5 May 2005	The Borough of Stockton-on-Tees (Electoral Changes) Order 2003; The Borough of Stockton-on-Tees (Electoral Changes) (Amendment) Order 2005	Draft report 14 May 2002 Final report 18 March 2003
10 June 2004	The Borough of Gateshead (Electoral Changes) Order 2004	Draft report 25 February 2003 Final report 21 October 2003
10 June 2004	The Borough of North Tyneside (Electoral Changes) Order 2004	Draft report 25 February 2003 Final report 21 October 2003
10 June 2004	The Borough of South Tyneside (Electoral Changes) Order 2004	Draft report 25 February 2003 Final report 21 October 2003
10 June 2004	The City of Newcastle upon Tyne (Electoral Changes) Order 2004	Draft report 25 February 2003 Final report 21 October 2003
10 June 2004	The City of Sunderland (Electoral Changes) Order 2004	Draft report 25 February 2003 Final report 21 October 2003
5 May 2005	The County of Durham (Electoral Changes) Order 2005	Draft report 22 February 2000 Final report 22 August 2000

=== Further electoral reviews by the BCfE ===
Date	Statutory Instrument	BCfE Report(s)
3 May 2007	The Borough of Castle Morpeth (Electoral Changes) Order 2007	Draft report January 2006 Final report August 2006
3 May 2007	The District of Wansbeck (Electoral Changes) Order 2007	Draft report January 2006 Final report August 2006

=== Further electoral reviews by the LGBCE ===
The Local Government Boundary Commission for England (or LGBCE) was established by the Local Democracy, Economic Development and Construction Act 2009 on 1 April 2010 as the successor to the BCfE. It continues to review the electoral arrangements of English local authorities on an ‘as and when’ basis.

Date	Statutory Instrument	LGBCE Report(s)
3 May 2012	The Hartlepool (Electoral Changes) Order 2012	Final report September 2011
2 May 2013	The Durham (Electoral Changes) Order 2012	Final report November 2011
2 May 2013	The Northumberland (Electoral Changes) Order 2011	Final report August 2010
7 May 2015	The Darlington (Electoral Changes) Order 2014	Final report August 2014
7 May 2015	The Middlesbrough (Electoral Changes) Order 2014	Final report November 2013
3 May 2018	The Newcastle upon Tyne (Electoral Changes) Order 2017	Final report November 2016
2 May 2019	The Redcar and Cleveland (Electoral Changes) Order 2018	Final report June 2018
6 May 2021	The Hartlepool (Electoral Changes) Order 2019	Final report February 2019
4 May 2023	The Stockton-on-Tees (Electoral Changes) Order 2022 (Note: Repealed and replaced by The Stockton-on-Tees (Electoral Changes) Order 2023, but boundaries for Stockton-on-Tees remained the same.)	Final report March 2022
2 May 2024	The North Tyneside (Electoral Changes) Order 2024	Final report October 2023
1 May 2025	The Durham (Electoral Changes) Order 2024	Final report November 2023
1 May 2025	The Northumberland (Electoral Changes) Order 2024	Final report October 2023
7 May 2026	The Gateshead (Electoral Changes) Order 2024	Final report July 2024
7 May 2026	The Newcastle upon Tyne (Electoral Changes) Order 2025	Final report January 2025
7 May 2026	The South Tyneside (Electoral Changes) Order 2025	Final report December 2024
7 May 2026	The Sunderland (Electoral Changes) Order 2025	Final report July 2024

=== Changes resulting from parish council boundary changes ===
These orders were made to subsequent to changes to civil parish boundaries.

Date	Statutory Instrument	Cause
1 May 2008	The Borough of Berwick-upon-Tweed (Parish Electoral Arrangements and Electoral Changes) Order 2008	Transfer of areas from Horncliffe and Norham to the new parish of Berwick-upon-Tweed; These boundaries were never used due to structural changes in Northumberland
6 May 2021	The Northumberland (Electoral Changes) Order 2020	Transfer of areas between Blyth and Seaton Valley
6 May 2021	The Northumberland (Electoral Changes) Order 2021	Transfer of areas between Ashington and Pegswood

== Structural changes ==
Date	Statutory Instrument	LGCE Report(s)
1 April 1996	The Cleveland (Structural Change) Order 1995	Draft report May 1993 Final report November 1993
1 April 1997	The Durham (Borough of Darlington) (Structural Change) Order 1995	Draft report July 1994 Final report December 1994
1 April 2009	The County Durham (Structural Change) Order 2008	
1 April 2009	The Northumberland (Structural Change) Order 2008	

Other structural reviews

- Northumberland - Draft report July 1994 Final report December 1994
- A report on the 1992-1995 Structural Review May 1995
- Overview report of 21 Districts in England September 1995
