= Local Government Commission =

Local Government Commission may refer to:

- Local Government Commission for England (1958–1967)
- Local Government Commission for England (1992)
- Local Government Commission (Ireland)
- Local Government Commission (New Zealand)
- Local Government Commission (Sacramento, California)
- North Carolina Local Government Commission

== See also ==
- Local Government Board (disambiguation)
- Local Government Boundary Commission (disambiguation)
