= Local Government Boundary Commission =

Local Government Boundary Commission may refer to:

- Local Government Boundary Commission (1945–1949)
- Local Government Boundary Commission for England (1972), in place until 1992
- Local Government Commission for England (1992), in place until 2002
- Local Government Boundary Commission for England, from 2010
- Democracy and Boundary Commission Cymru, originally the Local Government Boundary Commission for Wales
- Boundaries Scotland, originally the Local Government Boundary Commission for Scotland
