= Wilfred Burns (town planner) =

British town planner

Wilfred Burns CBE
- Born: 11 April 1923; Farnworth, Lancashire, England
- Died: 4 January 1984 (aged 60)
- Education: University of Liverpool
- Engineering career
- Practice name: Leeds City Council, Coventry City Council; Newcastle upon Tyne City Council, Ministry of Housing and Local Government

Sir Wilfred Burns CB CBE (11 April 1923 – 4 January 1984) was a British town planner, described as "a key figure in British post-war planning".

== Life and career ==
Burns was born at Farnworth in Lancashire, moving to Ulverston as a child following his father's death. After attending Ulverston Grammar School, he studied civil engineering at University of Liverpool, and undertook war service in the Admiralty. He began work in local government for Leeds City Council, before moving to Coventry City Council in 1949 where he was a member of the team working on the redevelopment of the city after its bombing. Following a period working for Surrey County Council, he moved to Newcastle upon Tyne City Council as its chief planning officer in 1960.

At Newcastle, he took charge of a newly created department—one of the first planning departments in the country—and worked closely with the city council's political leader, T. Dan Smith. With Smith's support, he proposed, in the 1961 Plan for the Centre of Newcastle and the 1963 Development Plan Review, the demolition and redevelopment of many of the city's areas of old terraced housing and their replacement by new blocks of flats. These would be connected and supported by an improved and largely new road system, giving priority to traffic movement and separating pedestrians onto walkways. At the same time, the plan sought to conserve historic areas. However, Burns wrote that "the city centre must cater to the maximum extent possible for car traffic". In this approach, Burns was influenced by the American architect Victor Gruen, and the proposals for Newcastle were sometimes referred to as creating "the Brasília of the North". The local newspaper, the Evening Chronicle, stated:

"The output of his department became prodigious. One radical plan after another—for new building, new roads, motorways, shopping centres, precincts—emanated from Mr Burns and his hardworking dedicated planning team. Reactions varied. Politicians became aerated with the visions of the future ..."

In 1968, Burns was appointed as chief planner at the Ministry of Housing and Local Government, becoming Deputy Secretary at the Department of the Environment (DoE) in 1971, with responsibility for integrating national land use and transport planning policy. He left the DoE in 1982, to become the deputy chairman of the Local Government Boundary Commission for England, and also served on national committees on the future of the planning system and on urban priority areas.

He was elected President of the Royal Town Planning Institute in 1967. He was appointed a CBE in the 1967 New Year Honours, a CB in the 1972 Birthday Honours, and was knighted in the 1980 Birthday Honours. He died in 1984 at the age of 60, after suffering from a heart condition.

== Bibliography ==
- British shopping centres: New trends in layout and distribution (1959)
- New towns for old: The technique of urban renewal (1963)
- Housing: A review of current problems and policies (1964)
- Newcastle-upon-Tyne: A Study in Replanning at Newcastle-upon-Tyne (1967)
- Traffic and transportation in Newcastle upon Tyne: A report (1967)
- Outlook for transport (1976)
