= Local Government Board (disambiguation) =

The Local Government Board oversaw local government in England and Wales from 1871 to 1919

Local Government Board may also refer to:

- Local Government Board for Ireland (1872–1922)
- Local Government Board for Scotland (1894–1919)
- Local Government Board (Isle of Man) (1922–1986)

== See also ==
- Local Government Commission (disambiguation)
