= Linton Global College =

Undergraduate college in Daejeon, South Korea

Linton School of Global Business Hannam University
- Type: Private
- Established: 2005
- President: Dukhoon LEE, Ph.D
- Dean: Jongwoon KIM, Ph. D
- Academic staff: 15 Professors
- Students: 200
- Location: 33, Ojeong-dong Daedeok-gu, 306-791, Daejeon, South Korea
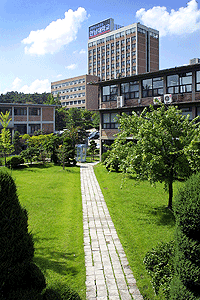
- Hannam Uni Tae-jeon campus

Linton School of Global Business (LSGB), formerly Linton Global College (LGC), Hannam University, is an undergraduate institution in Daejeon, South Korea.

Hannam University was ranked number 51 among Korea's best universities in 2011 by URAP, and 191 among Asia's Best Universities in 2010 by the QS Asian University Rankings. It was also ranked number 17 in Korea in 2012 by 4International Colleges and Universities, an organization that tracks the social web presence of universities. In 2011 the university was ranked 1562 worldwide, putting it in a peer-group of prestigious American liberal-arts universities including Amherst College, Barnard College, Bryn Mawr College, Oberlin College, Pomona College, and DePaul University.

== History ==
LSGB began in 2005 during an era in which Korean universities prioritized the modernization of university campuses and the development of international studies colleges. Other Korean universities with international colleges include Ehwa Women's University, Hankuk University of Foreign Studies, Hanyang, Kyung Hee, Korea, Keimyung, and Yonsei Universities. Several of these universities, including Hannam, are members of The Association of Christian Universities and Colleges in Asia. Though all of these programs teach their courses in English, LGC was among the first to do so with an international faculty. Additionally, LGC is the only of these colleges to offer a BA degree in Communication studies.

== Academics ==
The college currently offers one BA degree with two tracks: (i) Media & Culture and (ii) Global Business.

== Students ==
The QS Top Universities 2011 Asian Rankings listed Hannam as the 169th best university in Asia for attracting international students to study on campus. Additionally, LSGB students study abroad typically in their third year at one of Hannam University's partner schools. In 2010, Hannam University was ranked 47th in Asia for sending students to study abroad.

== Faculty and Administration ==
The first three presidents of the university were from the United States, including Dr. William A. Linton, from whom the college borrows its name. Hannam University is also ranked 120th among Asian universities for its high number of foreign faculty (as a percentage of total faculty). The largest number of these faculty are housed in LGC, which began its international programs at Hannam in 2005. It was thus one of the first colleges to offer such an international English-immersion 4-year degree program at the undergraduate level, and the first to do so with an international faculty. All classes are taught in English by English-speaking Korean professors and international faculty from the United States, Britain, Canada, Iran, and the Philippines, among other nations.

According to QS Top Universities, Hannam faculty are among the top 100 universities in Asia for knowledge production, as measured by the number of scholarly citations in academic journals.

== See also ==
- List of colleges and universities in South Korea
- Education in South Korea
