= Local Government Act 2010 =

Act of the Parliament of the United Kingdom

Local Government Act 2010 (Note: Section 2(3).)
- Act of Parliament
- Parliament of the United Kingdom
- Long title: An Act to prevent the implementation of existing proposals made for the purposes of Part 1 of the Local Government and Public Involvement in Health Act 2007.
- Citation: 2010 c. 35
- Introduced by: Eric Pickles MP, Secretary of State for Communities and Local Government (Commons); Baroness Hanham (Lords)
- Territorial extent: England and Wales (Note: Section 2(1).)

Dates
- Royal assent: 16 December 2010
- Commencement: 16 December 2010 (Note: Section 2(2).)
Other legislation
Relates to	Local Government and Public Involvement in Health Act 2007

Status: Current legislation

History of passage through Parliament

Text of statute as originally enacted

Text of the Local Government Act 2010 as in force today (including any amendments) within the United Kingdom, from legislation.gov.uk.

The Local Government Act 2010 (c. 35) is an act of the Parliament of the United Kingdom concerning blocking structural changes to local government in three areas.

== Provisions ==
It prevents further orders being made to implement the proposals that would have established Exeter and Norwich as unitary authorities, and prevents the implementation of the Suffolk unitary proposals.

The implementation orders were blocked by a High court ruling (Devon County Council & Anor v Secretary of State for Communities and Local Government), but Eric Pickles, Secretary of State for Communities and Local Government, said the "zombie proposals" still theoretically existed and had to be killed off.

== Legislative passage ==
The bill was introduced in the House of Lords on 26 May 2010.

The bill's second reading was blocked following Lord Howarth's argument that it constituted a hybrid bill. It ultimately passed third reading in Lords on 5 October.

== Reception ==
In favour of the bill, the government said that halting the plan would save £40 million in reorganisation costs. Lord McKenzie of Luton, a member of the opposition Labour Party, said that the bill would "shut out Exeter and Norwich from the opportunity to become unitary councils" in "an arrogant, dictatorial and brutal way".
