= Local Government Boundary Commission for England (1972) =

Defunct public body of the United Kingdom

The Local Government Boundary Commission for England (LGBCE) was the statutory body established under the Local Government Act 1972 to settle the boundaries, names and electoral arrangements of the non-metropolitan districts which came into existence in 1974, and for their periodic review. The stated purpose of the LGBCE was to ensure "that the whole system does not get frozen into the form which has been adopted as appropriate in the 1970s". In the event it made no major changes and was replaced in 1992 by the Local Government Commission for England.

== Predecessors ==
The Local Government Commission for England sat from 1958 to 1967, but few of its recommendations were accepted. The Labour government led by Harold Wilson established the Redcliffe-Maud commission in 1966 and broadly accepted its 1969 report, which proposed unitary authorities with provincial councils above them and metropolitan councils below. However, the Conservative party won the 1970 general election on a manifesto committed to a two-tier system in local government.

== Formation and membership ==
The commission was initially formed as the Local Government Boundary Commission for England Designate, a provisional body. The Commission only became permanent when the Local Government Bill received the royal assent in October 1972.

On 25 November 1971, Peter Walker, Secretary of State for the Environment, announced the membership of the commission designate. The chairman was Sir Edmund Compton, who had been the first Parliamentary Commissioner for Administration (or Ombudsman), and the deputy chairman was John Mitchell Rankin QC. There were five other members.

Schedule 7 of the 1972 Act placed the commission on a statutory basis, It provided that "The Commission shall be a body corporate consisting of a chairman, a deputy chairman and not more than five other members." All were to be appointed by the Secretary of State for the Environment for fixed terms.

=== List of chairmen and members ===
Chairman	Deputy chairman	Members
Sir Edmund Compton 1971–1978	John Mitchell Rankin 1971–1980	The Countess of Albemarle, (Chairman of the Development Commission) 1971–1976; T C Benfield (former Town Clerk of York City Council) 1971–1976; Professor Michael Chisholm (Reader in Economic Geography, Bristol University) 1971–1978; Sir Andrew Wheatley (former Clerk of Hampshire County Council) 1971–1977; F B Young (Former Clerk of Preston Rural District Council) 1971–1976; Lady Oriol Bowden 1977–1981; J T Brockbank 1977–1985; R R Thornton 1977–1982; D P Harrison 1977–1984; Professor G E Cherry 1979–1989; Lady Ackner 1981–1987; Sir Wilfred Burns 1982; B Scholes 1984–1989; K J L Newell 1984–1987; G R Prentice 1985–1992; Ken F J Ennals 1987–1992; Helen R V Sarkany 1988–1992; Professor K Young 1990–1992; Clifford W Smith 1990–1992
Sir Nicholas Morrison 1978–1981	Vacant August 1980 – February 1982	
Vacant July 1981 – March 1983	Vacant August 1980 – February 1982	
Vacant July 1981 – March 1983	R R Thornton 1982	
Vacant July 1981 – March 1983	Sir Wilfred Burns 1982–1984	
Geoffrey Ellerton (knighted 1992) 1983–1992	Sir Wilfred Burns 1982–1984	
Geoffrey Ellerton (knighted 1992) 1983–1992	J G Powell 1984–1990	
Ken F J Ennals 1992	Vacant 1990–1992	

== Initial work ==
The first task of the LGBCE Designate was to divide England outside of Greater London and the metropolitan counties into non-metropolitan districts. In February 1972 it was announced that the government wished to hold elections for the new district councils in June 1973, requiring the commission to finalise its scheme by November 1972, five months earlier than originally envisaged. It was expected that there would be about 300 districts.

=== Draft proposals for non-metropolitan districts ===
The commission duly produced its draft proposals on 26 April 1972, proposing the creation of 278 districts, replacing 950 existing county and non-county boroughs and urban and rural districts. The commission's target population for the new districts was between 75,000 and 100,000 inhabitants: 115 of the proposed districts fell into this range. There was some surprise that it was proposed that more than 30 existing county boroughs were to continue as districts without boundary changes. It had been expected that the town boundaries would be extended to include surrounding rural areas, but this was instead to be left to later periodic reviews. No district was to have less than 40,000 population, although this led to some very large districts in sparsely populated areas of Cumbria, Northumberland, Somerset and Shropshire. The populations of the districts to be created varied from 425,203 in Bristol to 40,245 in Tamworth. The largest district was to be that containing the Hexham and Prudhoe areas of Northumberland at 548,825 acres (2,221 km^{2}) and the smallest was to be Watford in Hertfordshire with an area of 5,298 acres (21 km^{2}).

=== Consultation ===
Written objections to the scheme were to be received by 21 June, after which the commission would hold meetings with existing authorities before presenting their final proposals. The only formal objection from an existing local authority was from Banstead Urban District Council, who submitted a petition with 12,000 signatures objecting to its proposed merger with the neighbouring Borough of Reigate. However, over 20,000 submissions from individuals and organisations were received.

In September 1972 the commission held a number of meetings with councils in Dorset, Herefordshire, Lincolnshire and Shropshire. It was clear that it was reconsidering the number and size of districts in these counties, as well as in Cumbria and Northumberland.

=== Final report ===
The commission's Report No.1 was published on 21 November 1972. Following the process of consultation, the number of districts had increased by 18 to 296. There were also a number of changes to districts due to the alteration of county boundaries as the Local Government Act had passed through parliament. There were now 14 districts with populations of less than 40,000 population, while 104 were to be of the optimum range of between 75,000 and 100,000. The recommendations were accepted, and carried into effect by statutory instrument on 21 December 1972.

Proposed boundaries for wards for the election of district councillors were to be circulated within three weeks, with final arrangements to be made by February or March 1973, allowing polling to be held in June.

=== Names ===
The second task of the commission was to decide on names for the new districts. A deadline of 13 February 1973 was given for suggested names to be submitted.

The commission invited the merging authorities to suggest up to three names for each district which should have "general acceptance and should be relevant to the geography or history of the locality".

In March 1973 the commission published the names by which the new districts would be known: the report stated that names "were chosen with regard to local feeling, and to geographical background. Simple names were preferred to hybrid or concocted names, and care was taken to avoid names that might cause confusion between the new districts and existing parishes or other authorities."

=== Successor parishes ===
The third task of the commission was to decide which small urban districts and municipal boroughs should become successor parishes. The existing urban district council or town council would become a parish council, and would retain some of the property and minor responsibilities of the abolished authority. These successor councils could also adopt the status of "town", and elect a "town mayor" as chairman. The concept of successor parishes had been introduced late in the passage of the Local Government Act following pressure from small towns that felt they would lose their identity in the large new districts. The guidelines issued to the commission were that towns were to have 20,000 or fewer inhabitants and were also to make up less than one fifth of the total population of the new district. In June 1973 the commission published a list of 269 boroughs and urban districts that would become successor parishes. All but twenty met the guidelines.

The Secretary of State for the Environment, Geoffrey Rippon, referred a number of failed applications back to the commission. In November 1973 a further twenty-seven towns were approved for successor status. The original rules had been relaxed slightly to allow larger towns such as Bideford and Chichester to become parishes.

== Powers and duties ==
Under the 1972 legislation the commission was given the duty of keeping local government areas under review. They were given the powers to:

- Alter a local government area
- The constitution of a new local government area outside Greater London by the amalgamation of two or more areas or by the aggregation of parts of such areas
- The abolition of a principal area (i.e. a county or district) outside Greater London and its distribution among other areas
- The conversion of a metropolitan into a non-metropolitan county or of a non-metropolitan into a metropolitan county and in consequence thereof the conversion of a metropolitan into a non-metropolitan district or of a non-metropolitan into a metropolitan district within the county
- The constitution of a new London borough by the amalgamation of two or more London boroughs or by the aggregation of parts of London boroughs or by the separation of part of a London borough
- The abolition of a London borough and the distribution of its area among other London boroughs
- The constitution of a new parish or abolition or redistribution of an existing parish
- The change of electoral arrangements for any local government area

=== Periodic reviews ===
The commission was to carry out a complete review of all counties in England, all metropolitan districts and all London boroughs, the boundaries between Greater London and the counties adjoining it, and the boundaries between the City and the London boroughs adjoining it not less than ten or more than fifteen years after 1 April 1974. They were to repeat this process at intervals of not less than ten or more than fifteen years. Similar reviews were to be made of the electoral arrangements for each county and district council. Each district council had the duty of keeping the system of parishes in their district under review, and were permitted to make proposals to the commission for the creation or abolition of parishes.

=== Reviews directed by Secretary of State ===
The Secretary of State had the power to direct the commission to conduct a review of all or any of the principal areas in England. He could also direct a district council to carry out a review of the parishes in their area. If they failed to do so within the required time, the commission could conduct the review themselves.

== Review process and the Enfield case ==
The commission duly began the process of conducting reviews of the electoral arrangements in the London Boroughs. In June 1975 they published proposals for Enfield, reducing the number of councillors from 70 to 66. Enfield council had submitted their own scheme, which they claimed provided a fairer distribution of seats to electors, and began court proceedings against the commission. In January 1978 Mr Justice Boswell ruled in favour of the council, and set aside the commission's decision. The ruling effectively halted the redrawing of wards throughout England. This in turn prevented the redrawing of parliamentary constituencies, which were to be formed by grouping the new wards, until the 1983 election. The judicial decision of January was overturned in the Court of Appeal in July 1978. The LGBCE was able to carry out the routine work of reviewing wards and parishes, with a large number of orders made during the 1970s and 1980s.

== Humberside and the Isle of Wight ==
Although it had the power, the LGBCE never created or abolished any county, district or London borough. The only major proposals made were in relation to the county of Humberside and the two districts on the Isle of Wight.

In March 1990 the commission finished a review of Humberside. It was recognised that the county was very unpopular, but the LGBCE recommended its retention as there was no agreement on what should replace it. By November 1990 the commission had changed its mind, and recommended that Humberside be abolished. The districts south of the Humber were to become part of an enlarged Lincolnshire, while those to the north would become part of a new county of East Yorkshire. The commission also agreed that the two districts in the Isle of Wight should be abolished, with the county council becoming a unitary authority. However, this was beyond their powers and would require primary legislation.

== Abolition ==
The LGBCE was abolished in 1992 by the Local Government Act 1992. The 1992 legislation allowed for a more fundamental reform of local government than the 1972 act, with a new commission able to carry out structural reviews and replace the two-tier system with unitary authorities. One of its first actions in 1993 was to recommend a unitary council for the Isle of Wight.
