= Local Government Commission for England (1992) =

English government review commission

Local Government Act 1992 (Note: Section 30(1).)
- Act of Parliament
- Parliament of the United Kingdom
- Long title: An Act to make new provision, by giving effect to proposals in Cm. 1599 (The Citizen's Charter) relating to publicity and competition, for securing economy, efficiency and effectiveness in the manner in which local authorities carry on certain activities; and to make new provision in relation to local government in England for effecting structural, boundary and electoral changes.
- Citation: 1992 c. 19
- Territorial extent: England and Wales; Scotland (in part); Northern Ireland (in part); (Note: Section 30(5)–(6).)

Dates
- Royal assent: 6 March 1992
- Commencement: various (Note: Section 30(2)–(4).)

Other legislation
- Amended by: Audit Commission Act 1998; Political Parties, Elections and Referendums Act 2000; Statute Law (Repeals) Act 2004

Status: Amended

Text of statute as originally enacted

Revised text of statute as amended

Text of the Local Government Act 1992 as in force today (including any amendments) within the United Kingdom, from legislation.gov.uk.

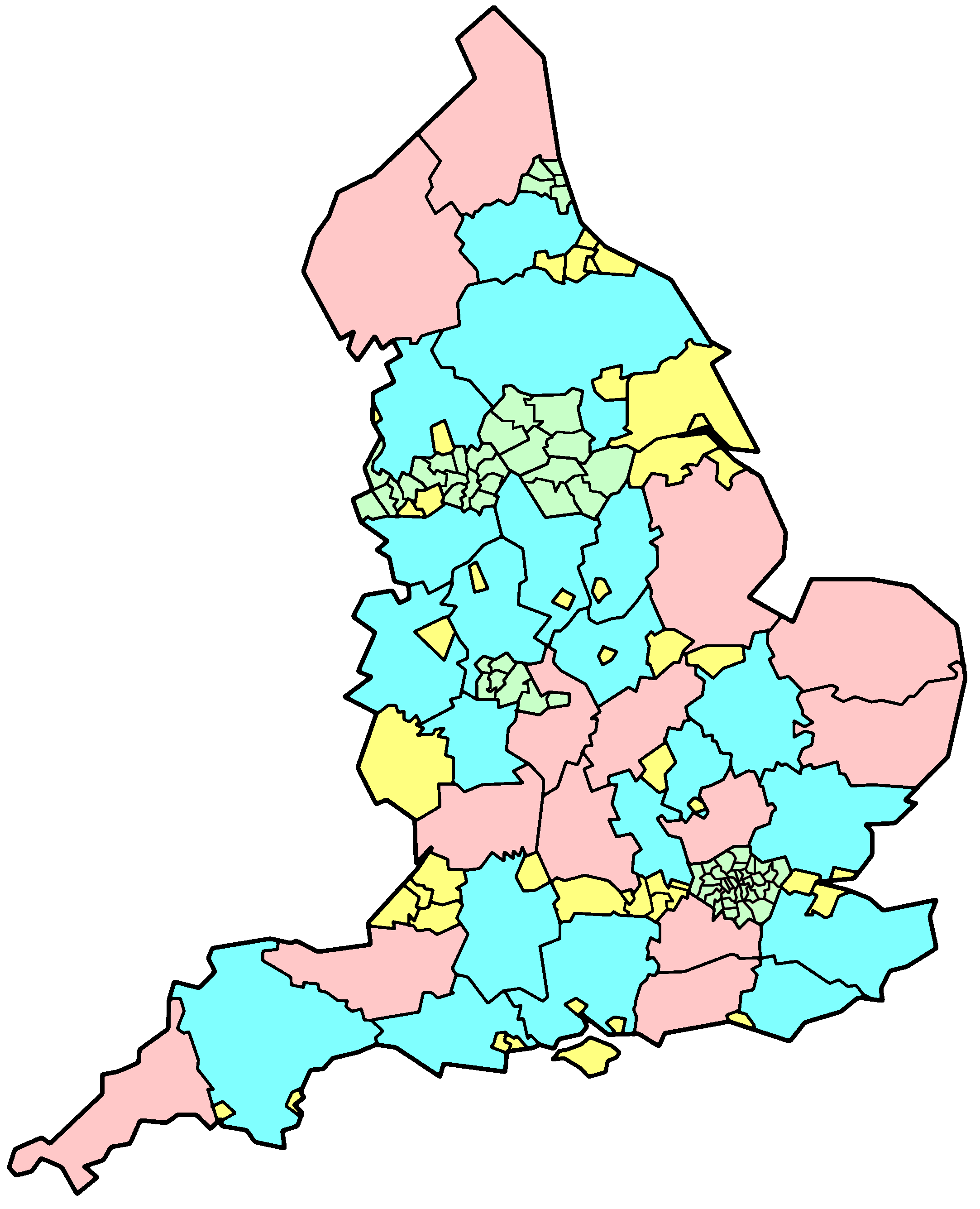
Map showing counties and unitary authorities from 1998. Pink (non-metropolitan) and green (metropolitan and London) areas were left unchanged. Yellow areas are unitary authorities created as a result of the review, whilst blue areas are remaining two-tier counties reduced by the creation of unitary authorities.

The Local Government Commission for England was the body responsible for reviewing the structure of local government in England from 1992 to 2002. It was established under the Local Government Act 1992 (c. 19), replacing the Local Government Boundary Commission for England. The commission could be ordered by the Secretary of State to undertake "structural reviews" in specified areas and recommend the creation of unitary authorities in the two-tier shire counties of England. The commission, chaired by John Banham, conducted a review of all the non-metropolitan counties of England from 1993 to 1994, making various recommendations on their future.

After much political debate and several legal challenges, the commission's proposals resulted in the abolition of Berkshire county council and the counties of Avon, Cleveland, Hereford and Worcester and Humberside (created in 1974). Combined with a second wave of reviews in 1995, under the chairmanship of David Cooksey, the Commission's proposals led to the creation of unitary authorities covering many urban areas of England, including cities like Bristol, Kingston upon Hull, Leicester, Derby, Nottingham, Stoke-on-Trent and Plymouth. Reforms in the rest of Great Britain followed a different course.

Following the structural review, the commission then reviewed electoral arrangements in English local authorities, re-warding based on population changes. It was replaced by the Boundary Committee for England in 2002, which finished this review cycle in 2004.

== Establishment ==
Local government was at the time organised under the Local Government Act 1972, which had been passed during Edward Heath's Conservative administration. Before this, local government in England had been a mixed system, with large urban areas being covered by unitary authorities called county boroughs, and the rest of the country having administrative county councils and many smaller district councils, with different competences. The 1972 Act abolished county boroughs, making them districts in two-tier counties. This, and the consequent loss of education, social services and libraries to county control, was strongly regretted by the larger towns outside the new metropolitan counties, such as Bristol, Plymouth, Stoke, Leicester and Nottingham.

Michael Heseltine, who had been a junior local government minister during the passage of the Local Government Act 1972, was appointed as Secretary of State for the Environment (and thus responsible for local government) in John Major's first cabinet of 1990. Heseltine was an enthusiast for unitary local government, and was also an early proponent of the idea of directly elected mayors, to be taken up by Tony Blair's government in the 2000s.

A wide range of political opinion had always favoured in principle the establishment of unitary authorities. The Labour Party had planned to implement the Redcliffe-Maud Report in the 1970s, and the party's 1982 statement of policy "Labour's Programme 1982" said "There is an irrational split of functions between the two tiers compounded by a confusing overlap of responsibilities ... We favour the creation in England and Wales of unitary authorities". Heseltine announced in 1991 that the government would be looking at the creation of unitary authorities in the non-metropolitan counties as part of a more general review of local government, including the abolition of the Community Charge, or poll tax.

Heseltine was replaced by Michael Howard in April 1992 after the 1992 general election. Whilst Heseltine had expressed a wish for most of the country to become unitary authorities, Howard issued revised guidance on the basis that the "two-tier structure may be appropriate in some areas", and that the costs of reorganisation might be too much for the recession-hit UK economy to take.

The commission, chaired by John Banham (named to the post in November 1991, before the legislation had been passed to create the Commission), started the reviews in July 1992. The process was originally supposed to take some years, with the shire counties being considered in five waves, or "tranches", and it was hoped that the reforms would come into effect from 1994 to 1998. The process took longer than expected, with the Commission unable to recruit enough staff until November 1992. The first tranche, covering Avon, Cleveland, Derbyshire, County Durham, Gloucestershire, the Isle of Wight, Humberside, Lincolnshire, North Yorkshire and Somerset was nearly done by the end of 1993. Banham had said that the Commission was expecting "early wins" in Cleveland, Humberside and Avon.

The first recommendation, published in 1993, was the decision to make Isle of Wight a unitary authority. The island had been split between South Wight and Medina boroughs, with an Isle of Wight County Council, since 1974.

== Acceleration ==
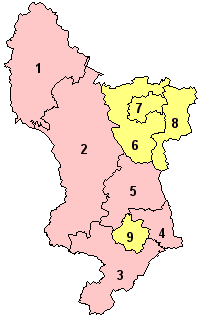
The Commission's final recommendations for county Derbyshire from 1993. Area Derby 9 would form a unitary authority, as would areas North East Derbyshire 6, Chesterfield 7 and Bolsover (district) 8. The rest of the county would remain two-tier. Ultimately only Derby would form a unitary authority.

Three more final reports, for Cleveland, Derbyshire and Durham, were published in November 1993. In both Derbyshire and Durham, unitary authorities would be created covering the large urban areas, but the rest of the county would remain two-tier in structure.

A new Secretary of State, John Gummer, had taken over in May, and he did not like these proposals, or the long time it took to produce them. Gummer sped-up the work plan and directed that all remaining reviews should start in December and be complete by the end of 1994. Gummer also issued new guidance, making it clear that wholly unitary solutions should be preferred, particularly ones smaller than existing counties but larger than existing districts. He further announced that Derbyshire and Durham would be referred back to the Commission for consideration under the new guidance. Gummer accepted the Commission's proposal to abolish Cleveland, but asked the Commission to consider Durham and Derbyshire again under the new guidance. The Labour Party, while remaining broadly in favour of unitary authorities, attacked the Commission for inconsistency. The leader of the Labour-controlled Derbyshire County Council questioned the inclusion of Derbyshire in the first tranche, which otherwise consisted mainly of counties newly created in 1974 and their neighbours.

The revised guidance included wording as follows:

In some areas the commission may wish to recommend a continuation of the existing two-tier structure. But the government expects that to be the exception, and that the result will be a substantial increase in the number of unitary authorities in both urban and rural areas.

Lancashire and Derbyshire county councils, fearing their abolition under the new guidance, took a case to the High Court, seeking a judicial review that it was illegal. On 28 January, the High Court ruled in their favour, deleting the sentence in dispute, implying that the Commission should consider retaining the status quo, either in part or wholly, as an option as well.

The commission recommended that Avon and Humberside should be abolished and broken up into four unitary authorities each. It also recommended that the rump Somerset be broken up into three unitary authorities (West, South and Mid). It suggested that North Yorkshire be split into three unitary authorities – one for York, and two others to be called "West Riding of Yorkshire" and "North Riding of Yorkshire" (the proposed West Riding would have taken in only a small part of the historic West Riding of Yorkshire, while the proposed North Riding would have included most of the historic North Riding of Yorkshire). It recommended no change in Lincolnshire and Gloucestershire. The County Councils of Avon, Cleveland and Somerset sought judicial review to stop these proposals going forward, but the High Court found them within the law.

The government accepted most of these recommendations, but also kept the status quo in Somerset ("after taking account of the number and strength of the representations which I received opposing the recommendations"), and in North Yorkshire retained a rump two-tier North Yorkshire without York ("in the light of the strong representations which I have received opposing the commission's recommendations for North and West Riding") – both reportedly the subject of strong lobbying by local Conservative MPs. The government did not accept the recommendations of the commission on Gloucestershire, and announced its intention to refer the county back. These changes were implemented in 1996.

== Remaining tranches ==
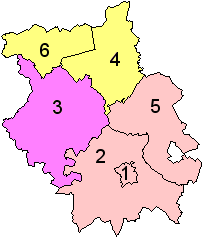
The commission's draft recommendations for Cambridgeshire. The purple area is Huntingdonshire, the yellow area the proposed Peterborough & The Fens authority, and the pink area the proposed City and County of Cambridge.

Reviews continued throughout 1994, with draft proposals published for consultation, outlining the commission's preferred option and other options. The Commission made extensive usage of MORI polling in each of the local areas affected to determine which options were more popular locally. For example, in Cambridgeshire, the Commission outlined three options for a split of the county into unitary authorities, the preferred option being a three-way split between the "City and County of Cambridge" (consisting of Cambridge, South Cambridgeshire, East Cambridgeshire), Huntingdonshire and Peterborough & Fenland.

In final reports delivered in October 1994, the commission recommended Buckinghamshire and Bedfordshire county councils be abolished and replaced with four and three unitary authorities respectively. In other counties, it backed down from more radical draft proposals, and it recommended no change in Cambridgeshire, Cheshire, Cumbria, Lancashire, Kent and Oxfordshire. In Hampshire it recommended that Southampton, Portsmouth and New Forest become unitary authorities.

A further batch of reports was delivered in December, recommending that Norfolk, Northamptonshire, Northumberland, Suffolk, Surrey, Warwickshire, West Sussex should remained unchanged. In Hereford and Worcester, Worcestershire would become a two-tier county whilst Herefordshire become a unitary authority. In Leicestershire, Leicester and Rutland would become unitary authorities, with the rest of the county remaining two-tier – a pattern followed also in County Durham (Darlington), Devon (Plymouth and Torbay), East Sussex (Brighton & Hove), Essex (Southend-on-Sea), Nottinghamshire (Nottingham), Staffordshire (Stoke-on-Trent) and Wiltshire (Thamesdown). The commission recommended the abolition of two county councils – Berkshire (which was to have five unitary authorities) and Dorset (which was to have four).

The final batch of recommendations was published in January 1995, slightly missing the deadline, and recommended no change for Cornwall, Gloucestershire, Hertfordshire and Shropshire. In Derbyshire it recommended the creation of a unitary city of Derby with the remainder of the county remaining two-tier.

In a January 1995 interview, Banham explained the decision-making process of the commission was based strongly on local opinion, noting that although a fully unitary solution for much of the country would commend all-party support in the House of Commons, he thought it would cause "mayhem" when implemented. He also advocated the creation of more parish councils in unparished areas. In a letter to The Times in March 1994, he noted he had the attitude that "if it ain't broke, don't fix it".

== Government reaction ==
On 2 March 1995, Gummer announced to the Commons that the government would not fully accept the commission's proposals and certain districts would be referred to the commission for a further review. He also announced John Banham's resignation in protest at this.

For Buckinghamshire, Bedfordshire and Dorset the government did not accept the commission's recommendations for an entirely unitary structure, and decided to only make Luton, Milton Keynes, Bournemouth and Poole unitary, with the rest of those counties remaining two-tier.

The proposal to abolish Berkshire County Council was accepted by the government. The commission had recommended five unitary authorities in Berkshire, based on the districts of Newbury, Reading, Wokingham, Slough, with Bracknell Forest and Windsor and Maidenhead districts merging to form a "Royal East Berkshire". Gummer decided to make each district a unitary authority. The proposal for an entirely unitary structure had been strongly supported by the County Council earlier, though with time and a change in political composition of the Council, it changed its mind and took this decision to court, seeking to have the entire Order declared invalid. The High Court ruled in their favour, but the Court of Appeal quashed this decision. This led to the implementation of unitary authorities of Berkshire to be delayed from 1997 to 1998.

In Hampshire, the commission had proposed unitary authorities for the cities of Portsmouth and Southampton, which were accepted by the government, and the larger and more rural New Forest district, which the government did not accept.

In many counties that were to remain unchanged, the government had reservations about specific districts. Gummer identified as candidates on his 2 March statement the districts of Basildon, Blackburn, Blackpool, Broxtowe, Dartford, Exeter, Gedling, Gillingham, Gloucester, Gravesham, Halton, Huntingdonshire, Northampton, Peterborough, Rochester upon Medway, Rushcliffe, Thurrock and Warrington. Shadow Environment Secretary Frank Dobson suggested that Cambridge, Ipswich, Norwich, Oxford and The Wrekin be added to this list: Norwich and the Wrekin were. Spelthorne was added at the request of the local MP, David Wilshire.

== Cooksey commission ==
The new commission was under the chairmanship of Sir David Cooksey, previously the chairman of the Audit Commission. The commission published draft proposals on the districts referred back to it in September 1995. It recommended unitary status for Blackpool, Blackburn, Halton, Northampton, Peterborough, Thurrock, Warrington and the Wrekin, and also that Rochester upon Medway and Gillingham should form a Medway Towns unitary authority.

The final recommendations deleted Northampton from this list, deciding that "as with Exeter and Gloucester, the separation of Northampton from its county would have a significant and detrimental effect". The government announced its acceptance of these recommendations in March 1996, and these changes were implemented in 1998.

The commission decided against unitary status for the three districts around Nottingham: Gedling, Broxtowe and Rushcliffe. Of the three, only Rushcliffe Borough Council supported a change. It considered but came down against unifying Dartford and Gravesham as a unitary authority (supported by Dartford but rejected by Gravesham). Exeter was considered too small. The Commission noted that Gloucester's proximity to Cheltenham would cause issues and that the two towns should be governed together. The Commission rejected the case of Huntingdonshire (a historic county, and the constituency of the Prime Minister, John Major), noting that there was "no exceptional county allegiance" and doubting the capacity of Huntingdonshire and the viability of the remaining Cambridgeshire. The Commission noted that tight boundaries for Norwich would cause a problem for unitary government, but that an extension would likely be strongly opposed. In Spelthorne the Commission was concerned about the lack of "internal coherence of the area" and its size.

While finding against a Basildon unitary authority, the commission recommended the removal of Billericay and Wickford from Basildon district and their addition to Brentwood and Rochford districts, leaving Basildon district focused on the Basildon New Town. The boundary alterations proposed between Basildon, Rochford and Brentwood were never implemented.

The commission also recommended boundary revisions between Peterborough and Huntingdonshire to incorporate the entire southern township of Peterborough in the city, and also boundary changes between Spelthorne and Runnymede as a result of changes in the path of the River Thames. The Peterborough changes were implemented as part of the Order for Peterborough, coming into force in 1998, and the alterations to the boundary between Runnymede and Spelthorne were implemented on 1 April 1997.

The commission was directed in 1996 to review local government in the Metropolitan Borough of Sefton in Merseyside, as a result of local demand for Southport to be removed from that borough. The final report recommended no change in the existing structure of local government in Sefton.

In 1996, the commission began a periodic electoral review of every local authority in England, reviewing the existing wards and electoral divisions and altering them to take into account changes in the electorate. This work was taken over by the Boundary Committee for England in 2002, and completed in 2004.

== Summary of proposals ==
| County | Commission recommendations | Government reaction | Date in force |
|---|---|---|---|
| Avon | four unitary authorities (Bristol, North Somerset, Bath and North East Somerset, South Gloucestershire) | accepted | 1996 |
| Bedfordshire | three unitary authorities (Bedford, Luton and Mid & South Beds) | Luton unitary authority only; two-tier remainder | 1997 |
| Berkshire | five unitary authorities (existing districts, with merger of Bracknell Forest and Windsor and Maidenhead as Royal East Berkshire) | six unitary authorities (one for each district) | 1998 |
| Buckinghamshire | four unitary authorities | Milton Keynes unitary authority only; two-tier remainder | 1997 |
| Cambridgeshire | no change | Huntingdonshire and Peterborough referred back; Peterborough accepted | 1998 |
| Cheshire | no change | Halton and Warrington referred back; both accepted | 1998 |
| Cleveland | four unitary authorities (Hartlepool, Middlesbrough, Redcar and Cleveland, Stockton-on-Tees) | accepted | 1996 |
| Cornwall | no change | accepted | – |
| Cumbria | no change | accepted | – |
| Derbyshire | Derby and North East Derbyshire (North East Derbyshire, Bolsover, Chesterfield); two-tier reminder | referred back under new guidelines | – |
| Derbyshire | Derby unitary authority; two-tier remainder | accepted | 1997 |
| Devon | Plymouth and Torbay unitary authorities; two-tier remainder | Exeter referred back; rejected | 1998 |
| Dorset | four unitary authorities (Bournemouth, Poole, East Dorset and West Dorset) | Bournemouth and Poole unitary authorities only; two-tier remainder | 1997 |
| Durham | Darlington unitary authority; two-tier remainder | referred back under new guidelines | – |
| Durham | Darlington unitary authority; two-tier remainder | accepted | 1997 |
| East Sussex | Brighton and Hove unitary authority; two-tier remainder | accepted | 1997 |
| Essex | Southend-on-Sea unitary authority; two-tier remainder | Basildon and Thurrock referred back; Thurrock accepted | 1998 |
| Gloucestershire | no change | referred back under new guidance | – |
| Gloucestershire | no change | Gloucester referred back; rejected | – |
| Hampshire | Southampton, Portsmouth and New Forest unitary authorities; remainder two-tier | Southampton and Portsmouth unitary authorities only; two-tier remainder | 1997 |
| Hereford and Worcester | Herefordshire unitary authority; two-tier Worcestershire | accepted | 1998 |
| Hertfordshire | no change | accepted | – |
| Humberside | four unitary authorities (East Riding of Yorkshire, Kingston upon Hull, North Lincolnshire, North East Lincolnshire) | accepted † | 1996 |
| Isle of Wight | one unitary authority | accepted | 1995 |
| Kent | no change | Dartford, Gillingham, Gravesham and Rochester upon Medway referred back; Dartford and Gravesham rejected, Gillingham and Rochester joined to form Medway Towns unitary authority | 1998 |
| Lancashire | no change | Blackpool and Blackburn referred back; accepted | 1998 |
| Leicestershire | Leicester and Rutland unitary authorities; two-tier remainder | accepted | 1997 |
| Lincolnshire | no change | accepted | – |
| Norfolk | no change | Norwich referred back; rejected | – |
| North Yorkshire | three unitary authorities (West Riding of Yorkshire, North Riding of Yorkshire, York) | York unitary authority accepted; two-tier remainder | 1996 |
| Northamptonshire | no change | Northampton referred back; rejected | – |
| Northumberland | no change | accepted | – |
| Nottinghamshire | Nottingham unitary authority; two-tier remainder | Broxtowe, Gedling, Rushcliffe referred back; rejected | 1998 |
| Oxfordshire | no change | accepted | – |
| Shropshire | no change | The Wrekin referred back; accepted | 1998 |
| Somerset | three unitary authorities (West, Mid and South) | rejected; two-tier status quo kept | – |
| Staffordshire | Stoke-on-Trent unitary authority; two-tier remainder | accepted | 1998 |
| Suffolk | no change | accepted | – |
| Surrey | no change | Spelthorne referred back; rejected | – |
| Warwickshire | no change | accepted | – |
| West Sussex | no change | accepted | – |
| Wiltshire | Thamesdown unitary authority; two-tier remainder | accepted | 1998 |

† since the government rejected the Commission's proposal for a West Riding of Yorkshire authority to include parts of North Yorkshire and the Goole area of Humberside, Goole became part of the new East Riding of Yorkshire instead.

== Timetable ==
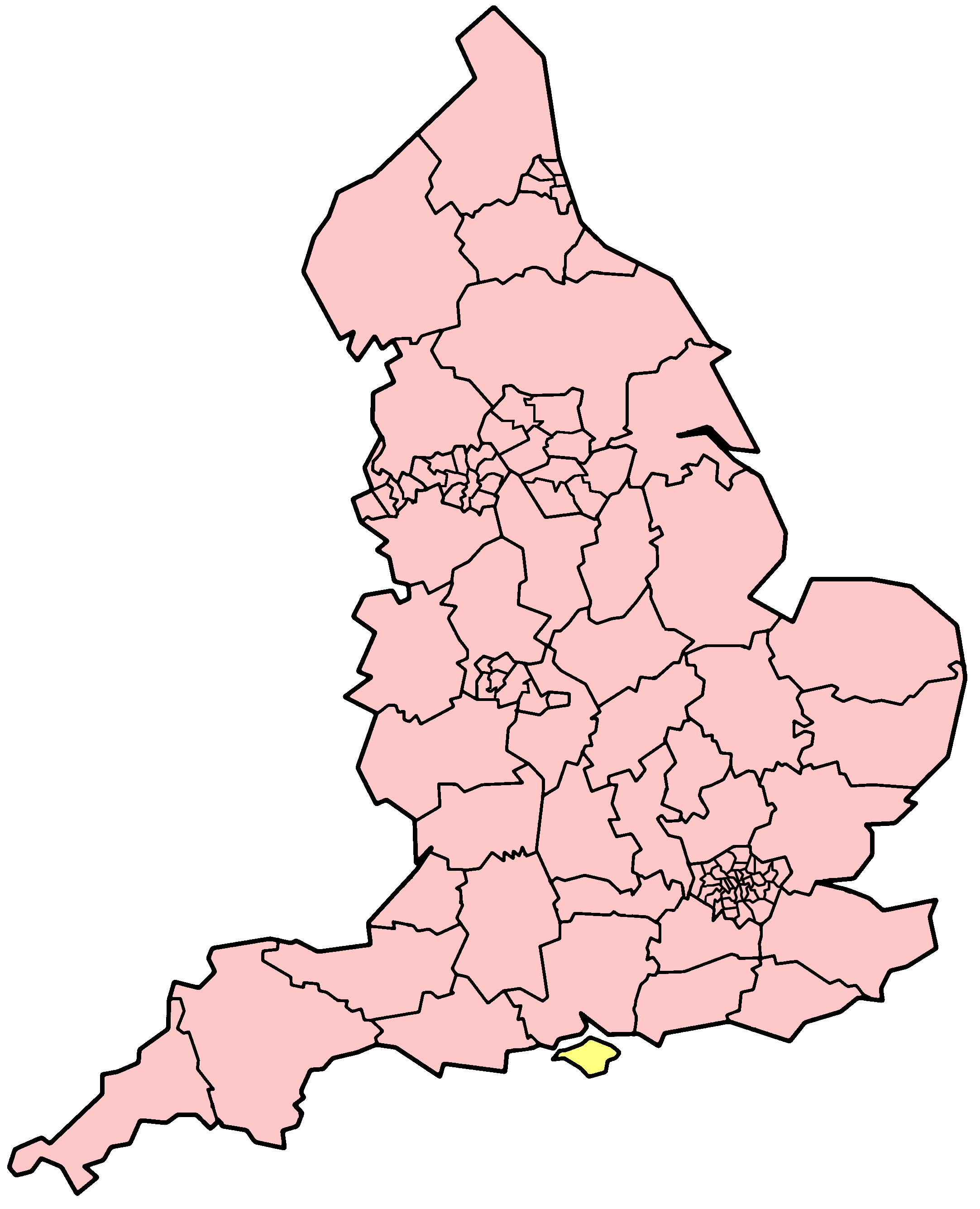

On 1 April 1995, the Isle of Wight became a unitary authority.

Two small areas were ceded from Surrey and Buckinghamshire to Berkshire, giving it a border with Greater London.

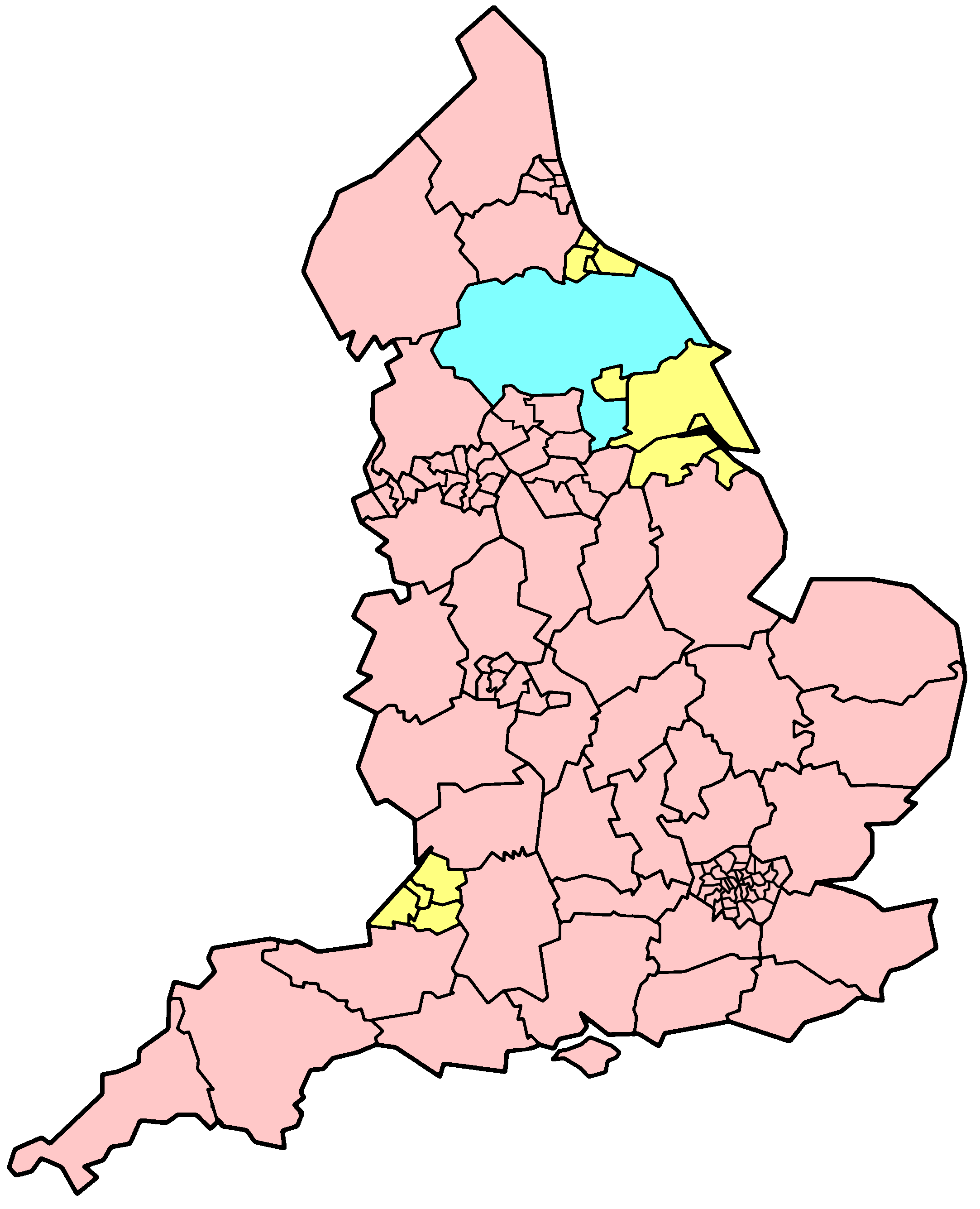

On 1 April 1996, the unpopular counties of Avon, Humberside and Cleveland were split into unitary authorities. Avon became Bath and North East Somerset, North Somerset, South Gloucestershire and Bristol. Each of Cleveland's four districts became a unitary authority. The part of Humberside north of the River Humber became part of the new East Riding of Yorkshire, apart from Kingston upon Hull, which constituted a unitary authority itself. In the Lincolnshire part of Humberside, two new unitary authorities, North Lincolnshire and North East Lincolnshire, were formed. Also at this time, the City of York was expanded and separated from North Yorkshire.

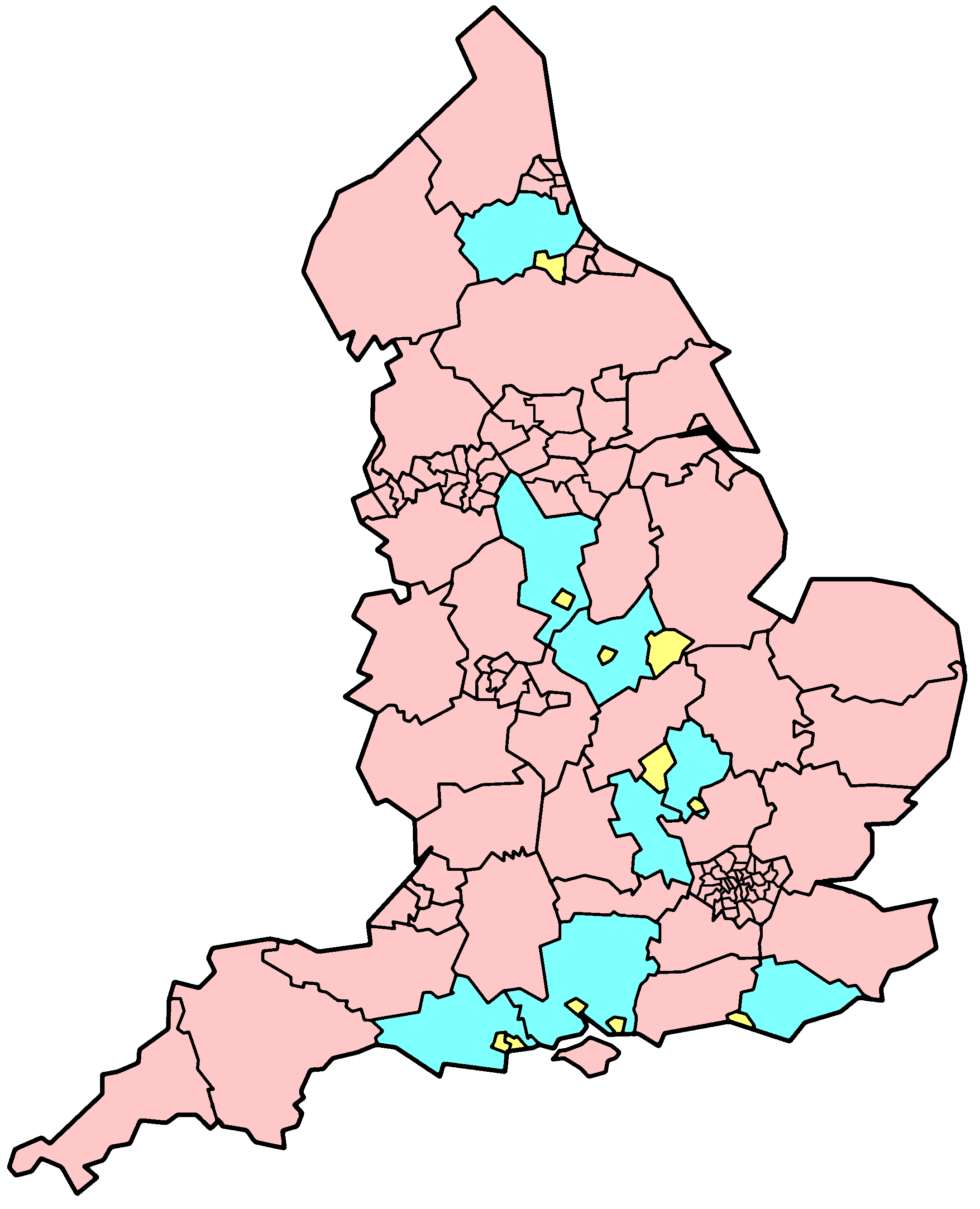

On 1 April 1997, the districts of Bournemouth, Darlington, Derby, Leicester, Luton, Milton Keynes, Poole, Portsmouth, Rutland and Southampton became unitary authorities. Brighton and Hove were merged to form the Brighton and Hove unitary authority.

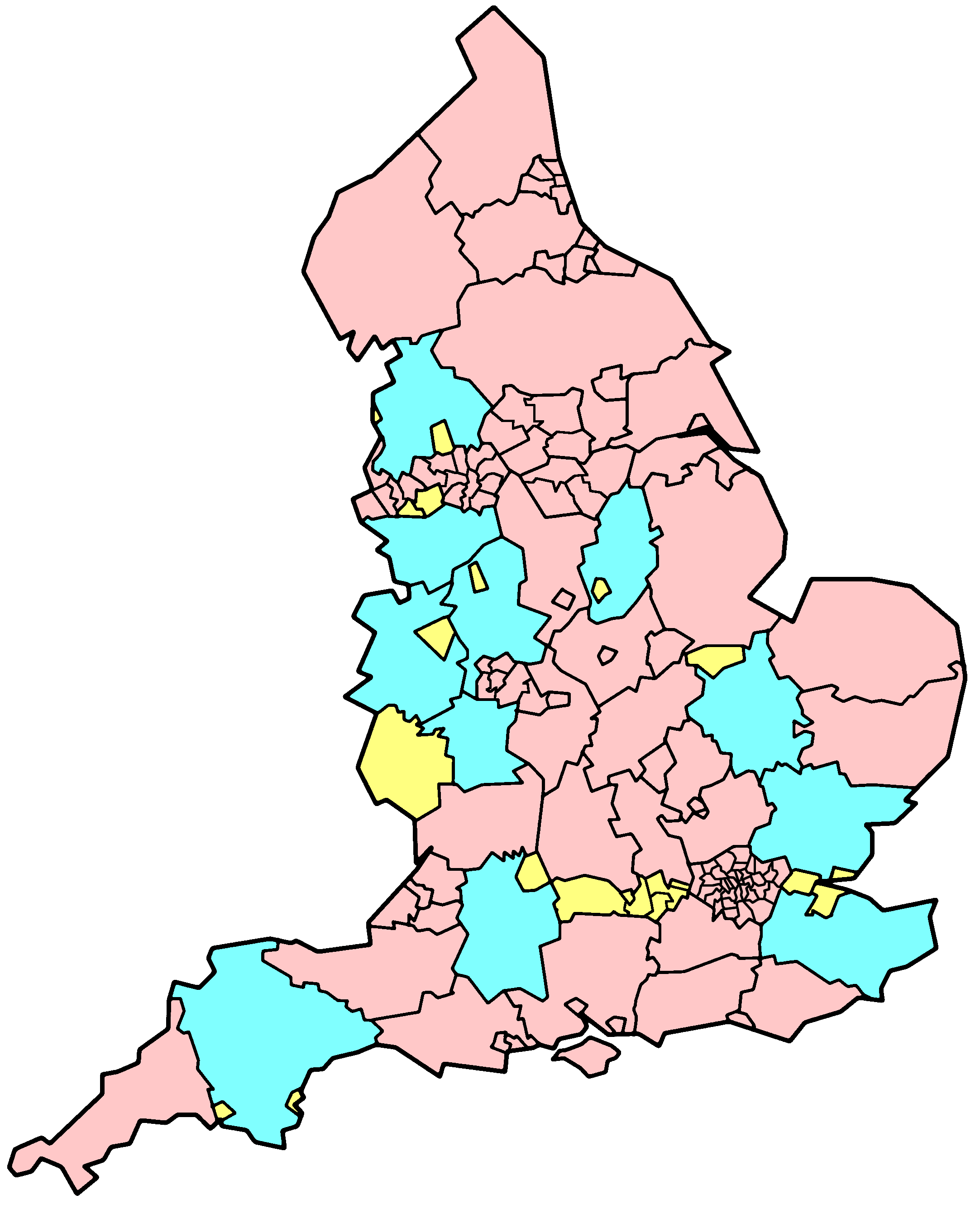

On 1 April 1998, Blackpool, Blackburn with Darwen (a renamed Blackburn), Halton, Nottingham, Peterborough, Plymouth, Stoke-on-Trent, Southend-on-Sea, Swindon (Thamesdown), Telford and Wrekin (The Wrekin), Torbay, Thurrock and Warrington became unitary authorities. Rochester upon Medway and Gillingham were merged to form the Medway unitary authority.

Also, Hereford and Worcester was abolished and replaced by the unitary authority of Herefordshire and the shire county of Worcestershire. Berkshire was split into six unitary authorities, but not formally abolished.

== Other changes ==
The local government reform did not affect police areas, or fire and rescue service areas, but resulted in the setting of many more joint boards for such authorities: previously county councils were represented on these bodies, and the creation of new unitary authorities meant that the apportionment of representatives was adjusted.

In addition to having their county councils abolished, Avon, Humberside and Cleveland were abolished as non-metropolitan counties. This, and the fact that many of the new unitary authorities were in themselves non-metropolitan counties, led to the concept of ceremonial counties for the Lieutenancy, which would include the areas made part of unitary authorities.
