= Listed buildings in Worthing =

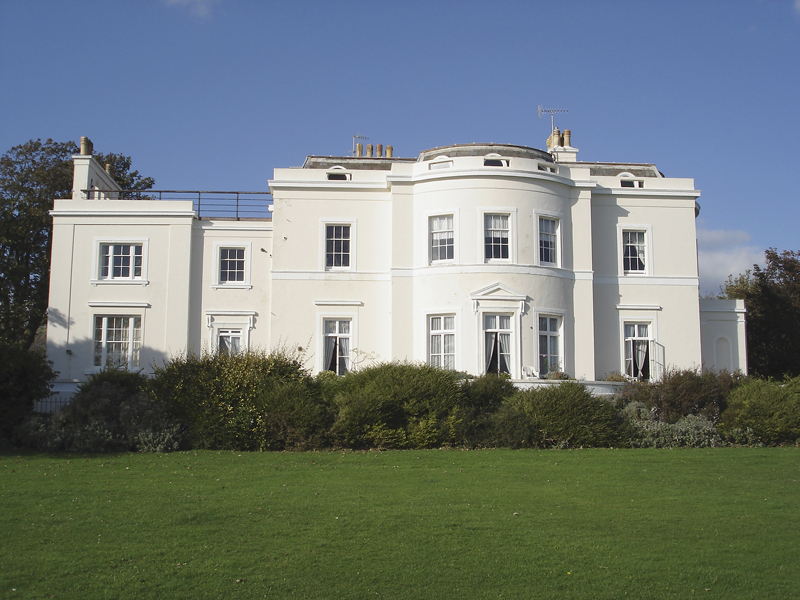
Beach House, an 1820s house built by John Rebecca and refurbished by Maxwell Ayrton, was saved from demolition in 1978 and is now in residential use.

Worthing, a town with borough status in the English county of West Sussex, has 212 buildings with listed status. The Borough of Worthing covers an area of 8,030 acres (3,250 ha) on the south coast of England, facing the English Channel. The town's development in the early 19th century coincided with nearby Brighton's rise as a famous, fashionable resort, and Worthing became a quiet seaside town with a large stock of Victorian buildings. Residential growth in the 20th century absorbed nearby villages, and older houses, churches and mansions became part of the borough. The Town and Country Planning Act 1947, an act of Parliament effective from 1948, introduced the concept of "listing" buildings of architectural and historical interest, and Worthing Borough Council nominated 90 buildings at that time. More have since been added, but others have been demolished. As of 2009, Worthing has three buildings of Grade I status, 11 listed at Grade II*, 196 of Grade II status and three at the equivalent Grade C.

In England, a building or structure is defined as "listed" when it is placed on a statutory register of buildings of "special architectural or historic interest" by the Secretary of State for Culture, Media and Sport, a Government department, in accordance with the Planning (Listed Buildings and Conservation Areas) Act 1990 (a successor to the 1947 act). English Heritage, a non-departmental public body, acts as an agency of this department to administer the process and advise the department on relevant issues. There are three grades of listing status. Grade I, the highest, is defined as being of "exceptional interest"; Grade II* is used for "particularly important buildings of more than special interest"; and Grade II, the lowest, is used for buildings of "special interest". Some Anglican churches are still graded according to an old system in which Grades A, B and C were equivalent to I, II* and II respectively.

== History of listed buildings and conservation in Worthing ==
From its origins as a fishing village, Worthing grew into a seaside resort in the early 19th century on the strength of royal patronage, the positive effect of nearby Brighton, the excellent climate and new road links to London. Land was quickly sold for speculative developments such as Liverpool Terrace and Park Crescent, individual residences such as Beach House and Warwick House, attractions like the Theatre Royal and churches such as St Paul's and Christ Church. Until the postwar Labour government passed the Town and Country Planning Act in 1947, there was no official system governing the preservation of historically significant buildings, and the rapid expansion of the town from the late 19th century onwards resulted in urban decay affecting the old town centre and demands to allow the clearance of buildings considered "obsolete and derelict".

Historically, despite the limited protection offered by listed status, the borough has had a poor record on conserving buildings of historic interest; architectural historian Ian Nairn described it as an "exasperating town ... full of [architecturally] ignoble endings". A 1947 plan by Charles Cowles-Voysey proposing the complete demolition and redevelopment of central Worthing was never implemented, but piecemeal changes since then (especially during the 1960s) have had a similar effect in removing many historically significant buildings. Indifference on the part of residents has been suggested: the demolition in 1970 of the old Theatre Royal—described as a "very precious survival" five years earlier—went ahead with no opposition. A conservation society was formed in 1973—much later than in similar towns; despite low levels of public support, it successfully saved Beach House from demolition in the late 1970s.

Listed buildings demolished or lost to redevelopment in Worthing include the old rectory at Broadwater, West Tarring's original Church House, most of the Humphrys Almshouses, the old Theatre Royal and the adjacent Omega Cottage.

Houses and commercial buildings—in some cases converted to other uses—make up many of Worthing's listed buildings, and several churches also feature. Other structures with listed status include an ornate cast-iron lamp-post—the only survivor of more than 100 installed when Worthing first received electricity, and saved from demolition in 1975; a K6 telephone kiosk in the Steyne, a seafront square; an 18th-century dovecote on a site where one has existed since the 13th century; and a recent addition: a 1989 sculpture by Elisabeth Frink consisting of four gigantic male heads cast in bronze and set on a stuccoed loggia.

== Delistings and anomalies ==
One of Worthing's earliest and most important hotels was Warne's Hotel. It was built as a five-house block called York Terrace in the 1820s, reputedly by John Rebecca. It was listed at Grade II on 11 October 1949. In the 1870s, the hotel was enlarged when an adjacent terrace of houses was taken over. This was listed separately, also at Grade II, on 21 May 1976. The hotel closed in 1985, and efforts to conserve it were thwarted when it was gutted by fire in 1987. Both parts of the building were demolished in 1992. The 1870s corner block was delisted (removed from the statutory list) on 19 October 1998, but the main block has not been officially delisted.

Most of the houses in Warwick Place, a short street leading off the Brighton Road, are listed, but No. 3 Warwick Place has lost its status. The three-storey cobbled flint building's structural features include a bay window and a cornice supported by a modillion. It was listed at Grade II on 21 May 1976 and delisted on 1 August 2000.

The town had an Odeon cinema between 1934 and 1988, when it was demolished. It stood at the head of Liverpool Terrace, and was built in the Art Deco style with a prominent belvedere. The 1,600-capacity building cost £40,700. It was listed at Grade II on 26 March 1987, after its closure, but was removed from the statutory list on 27 July 1987.

On Marine Parade, numbers 66 and 67—part of the former Trafalgar Terrace—were listed in 1974. The four-storey houses dated from the early 19th century, and were bow-fronted and stuccoed. They were subsequently demolished, and a modern block of flats now stands on the site. They have not been officially delisted.

St Mary's Farmhouse in Durrington had two attendant barns, which were listed separately from the house (along with its front garden wall) to reflect their architectural value as a group. After the farmhouse was damaged by arsonists in 1978, it was saved from threatened demolition, but the barns were knocked down. One lay diagonally across the southwest corner of the farmhouse grounds; it was built mainly of flint and had a hipped roof of thatch. The other, of similar materials but with a partly gabled roof with a weatherboarded exterior, stood south of the house. An adjacent outbuilding, with a pentice roof, was included in its listing. Despite their demolition, they have not been officially delisted.

English Heritage's former listing system for Anglican churches, in which Grades A, B and C were used instead of I, II* and II respectively, has not been eliminated completely. St Andrew's (central Worthing), St Botolph's and St George's Churches are graded C instead of II. St Mary's Church at Broadwater was originally listed at Grade B, but has since been upgraded to Grade I.

Castle Goring and its associated buildings are very close to the border with the neighbouring district of Arun. Castle Goring Lodge was incorrectly classified by English Heritage as being in the civil parish of Clapham in Arun, but Worthing Borough Council's more recently updated listed building register correctly identifies its location as Worthing.

== Listed buildings ==
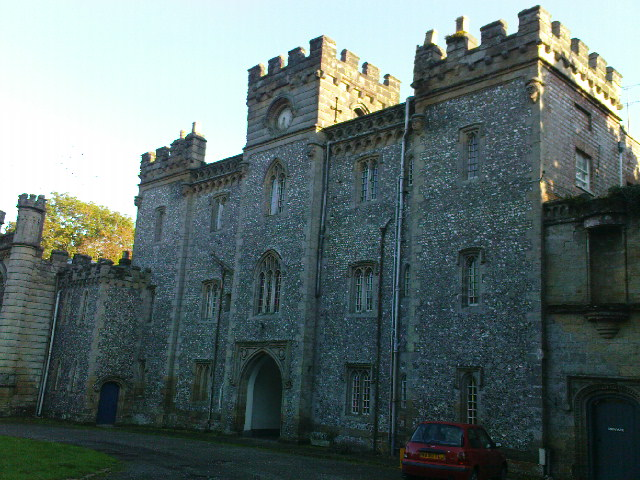
The "astonishing" Grade I-listed Castle Goring was empty, suffering structural decay until Lady Colin Campbell rescued it.

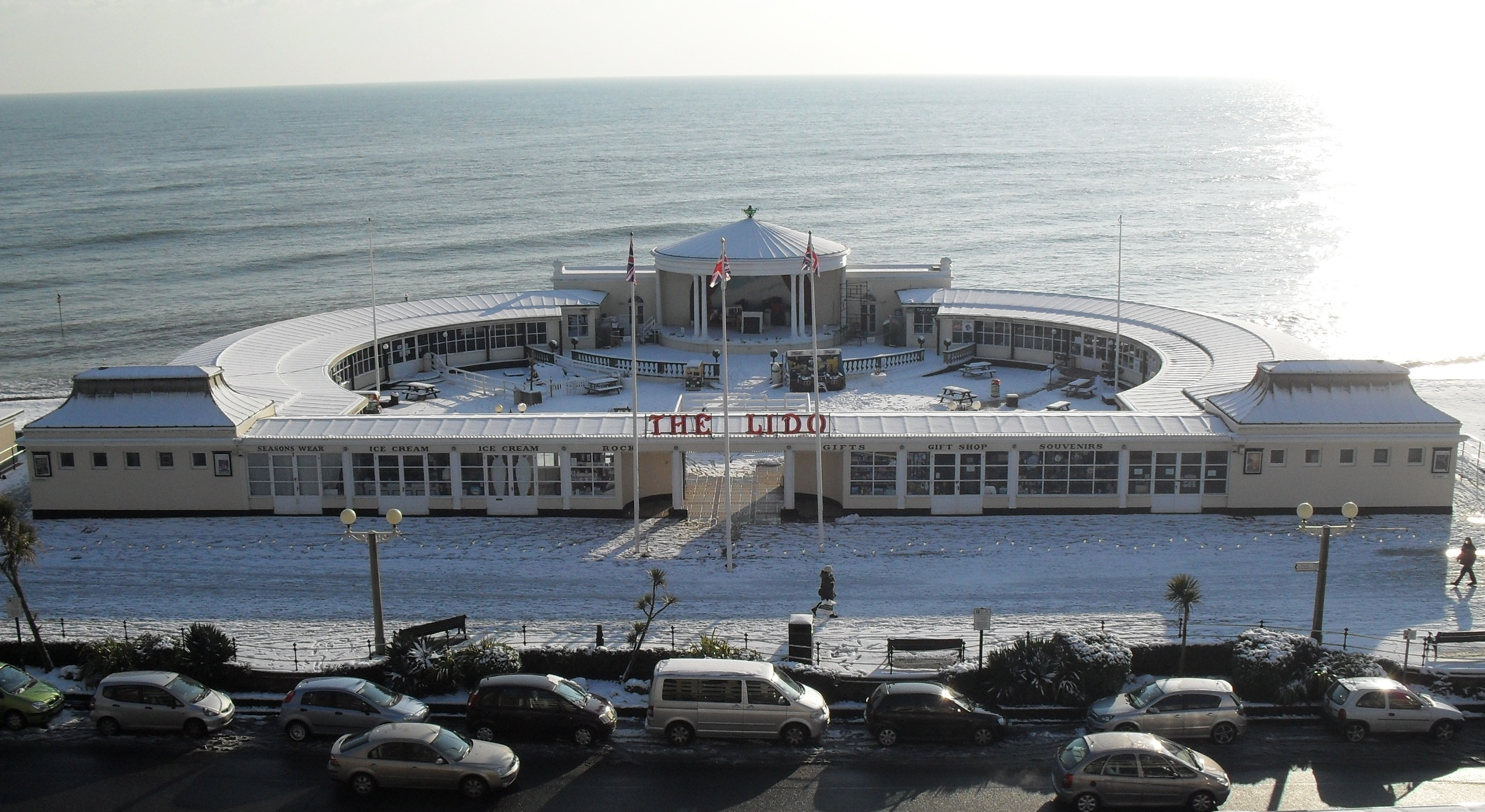
Worthing Lido was originally an outdoor concert venue.

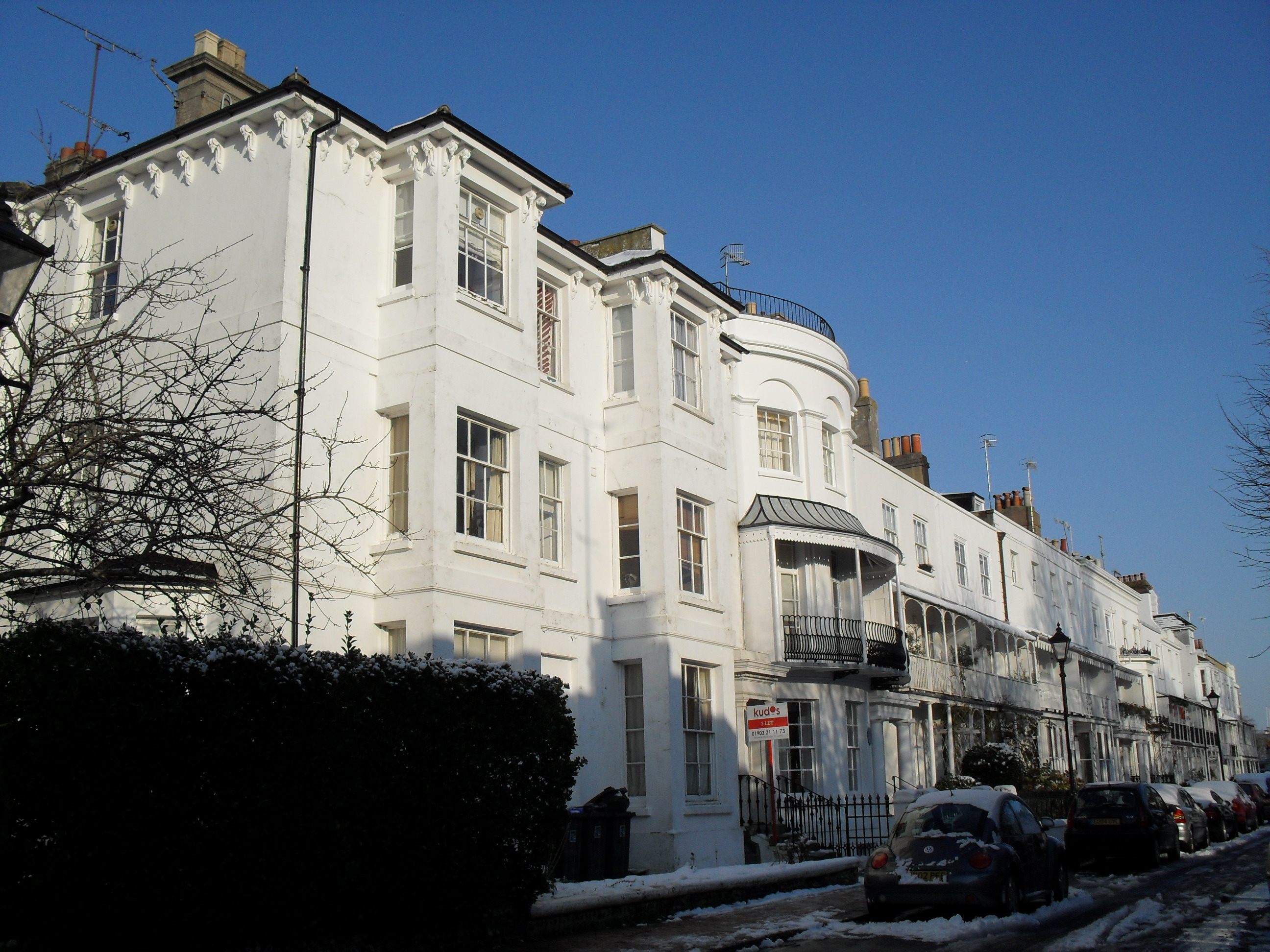
Ambrose Place was one of Worthing's early speculative developments.

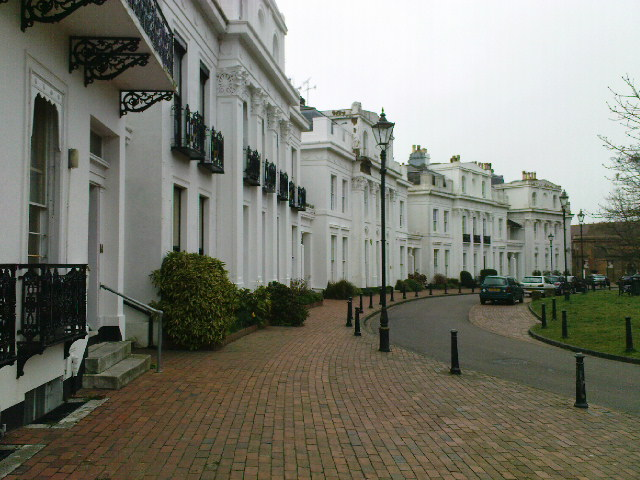
Park Crescent was designed by Amon Henry Wilds in a late Regency style.

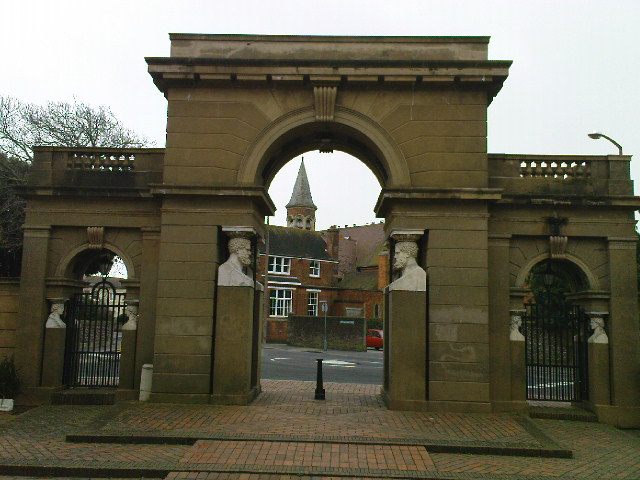
Park Crescent is reached through this triumphal arch, protected by a trust since 1957.

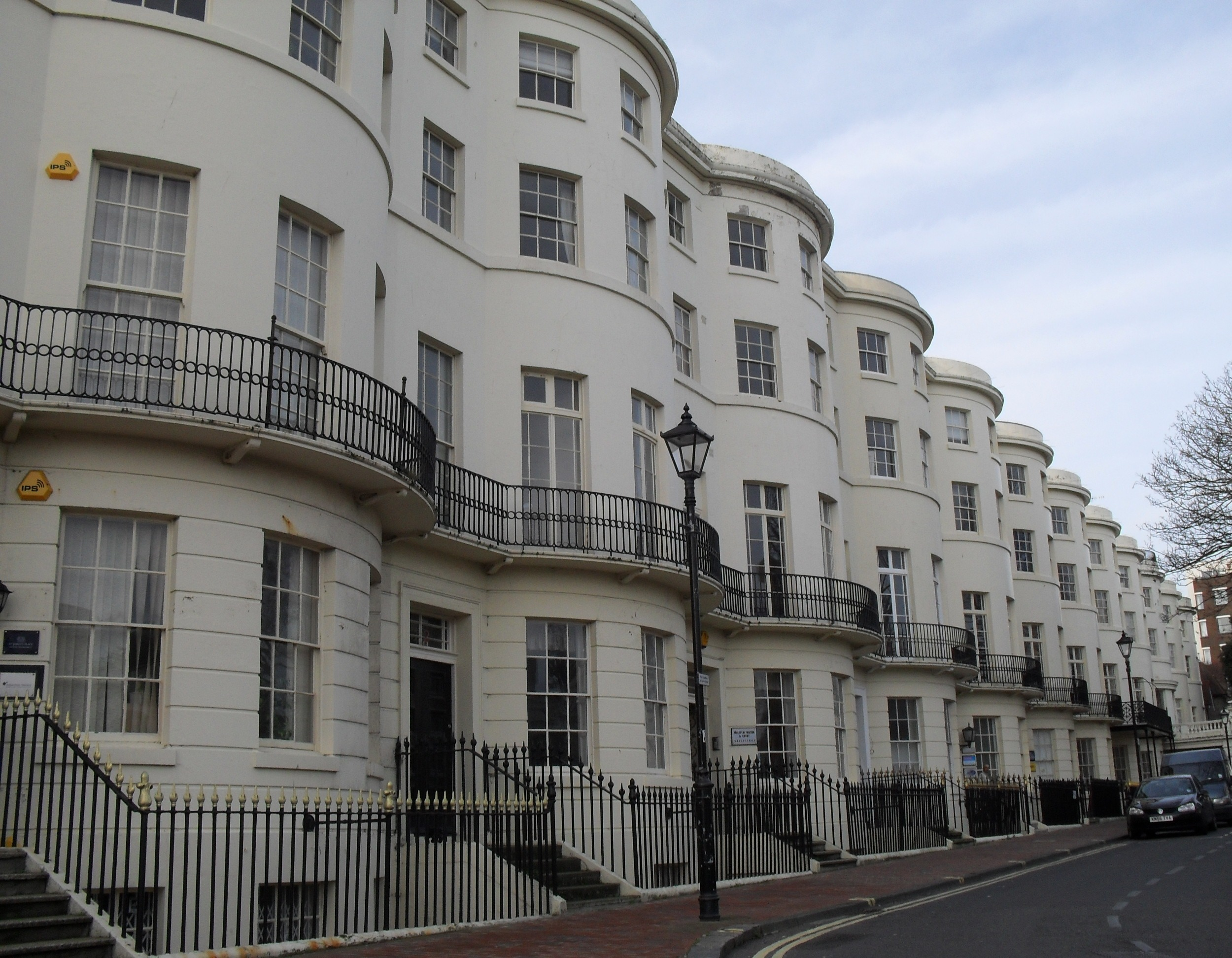
Liverpool Terrace was built in 1828 during a period of rapid growth in the town.

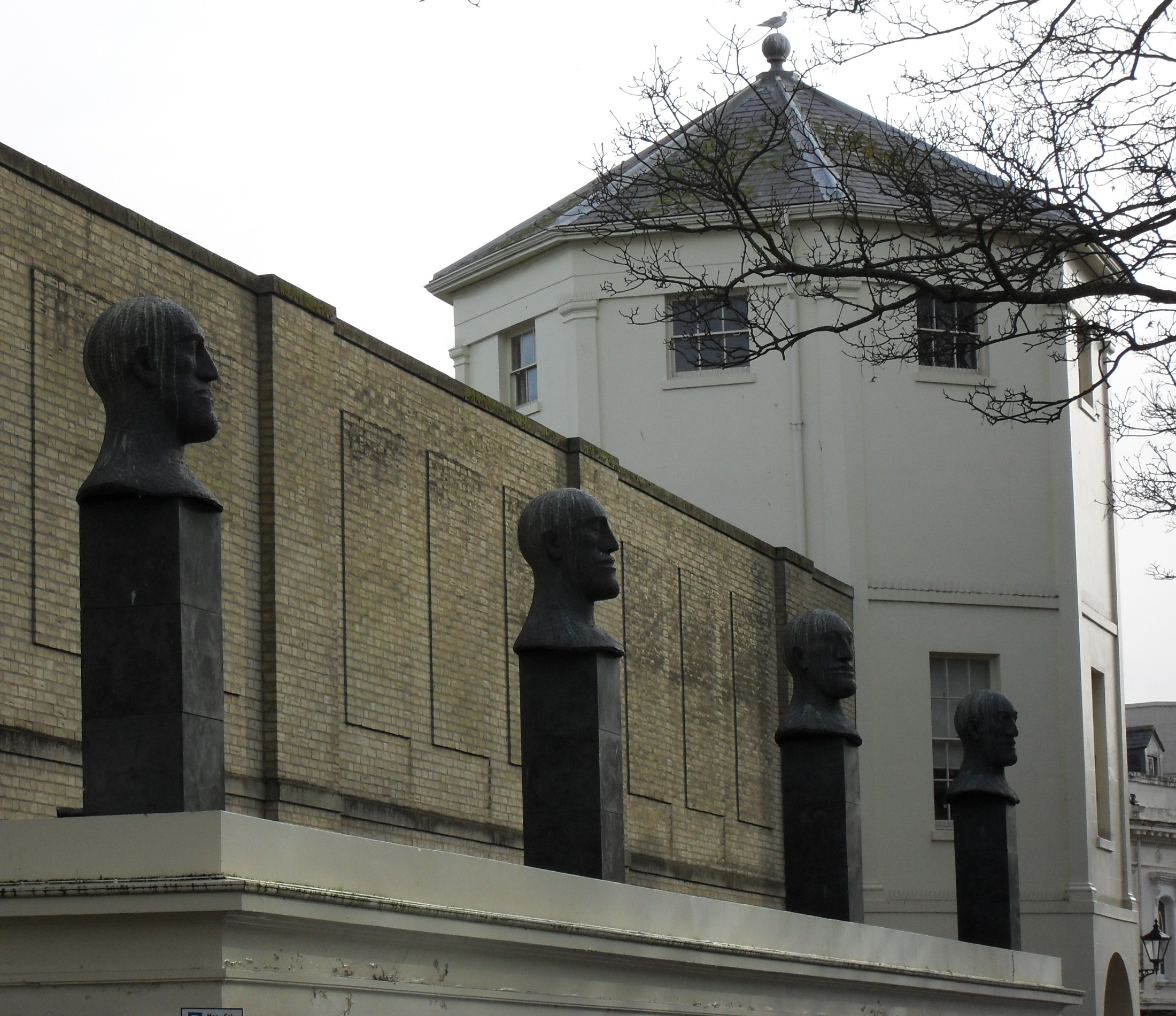
Dame Elisabeth Frink's sculpture of four gigantic male heads faces Liverpool Terrace.

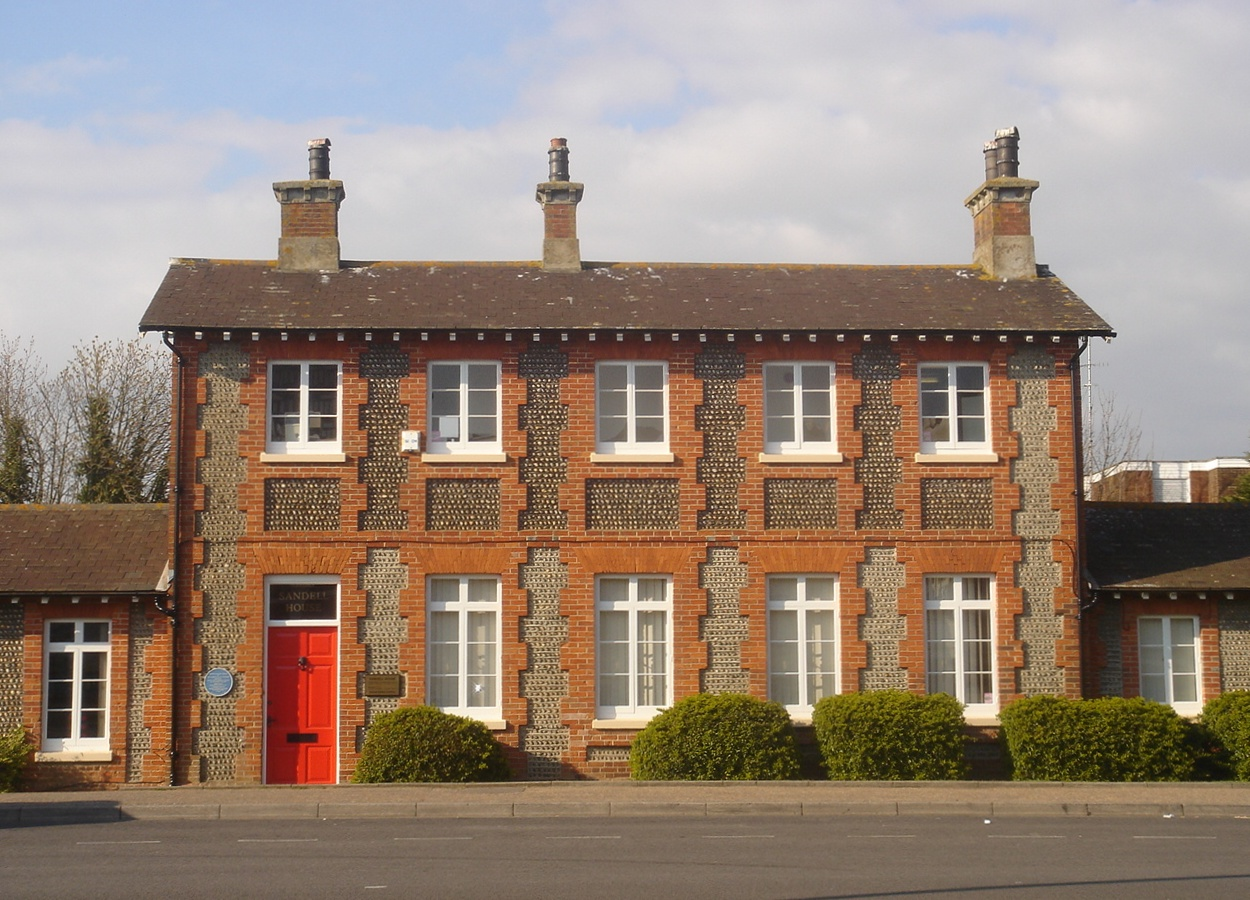
Worthing's first railway station, now an office, was built in 1845.

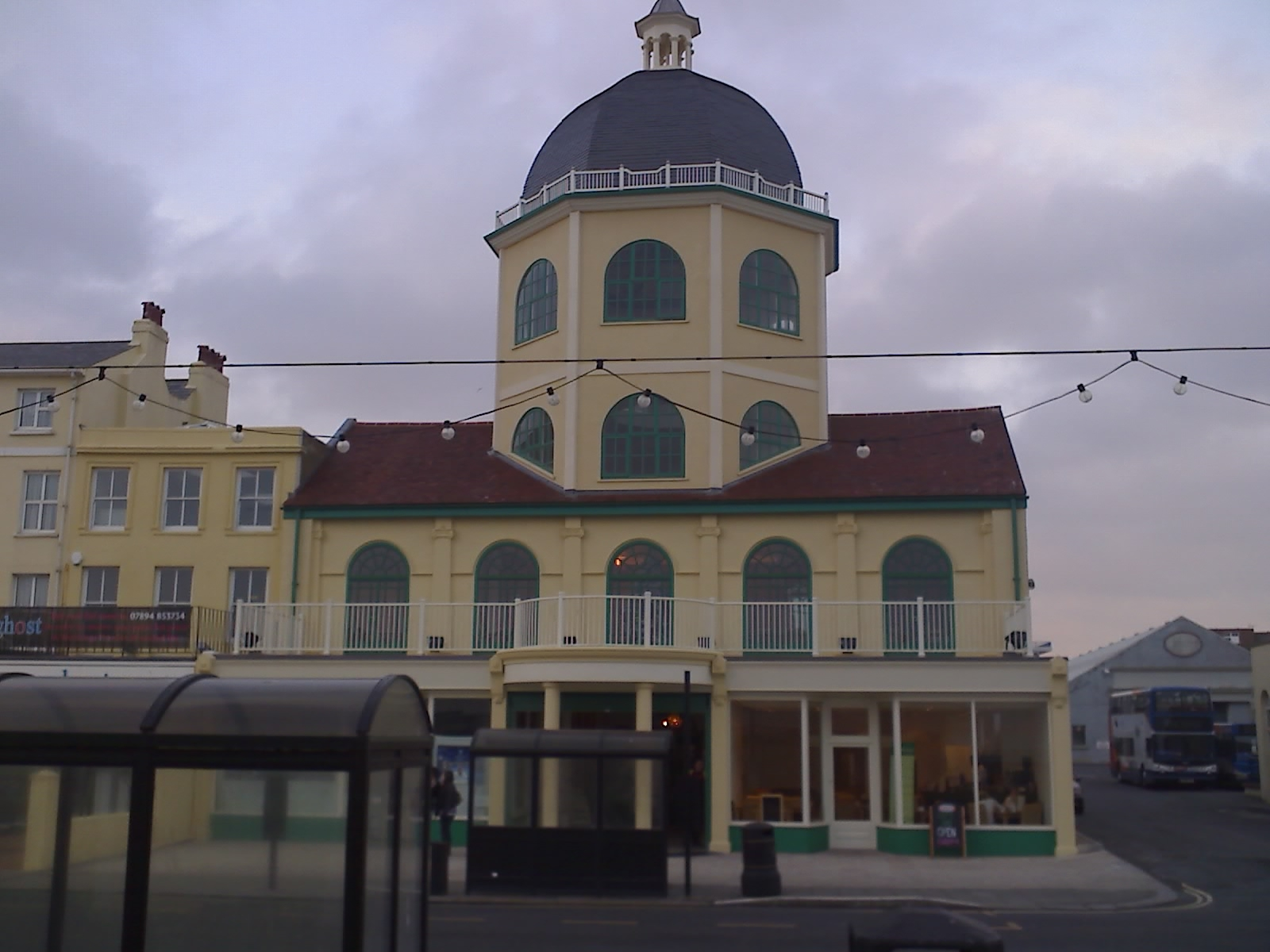
The Dome Cinema was opened in 1910 by Swiss entrepreneur Carl Seebold.

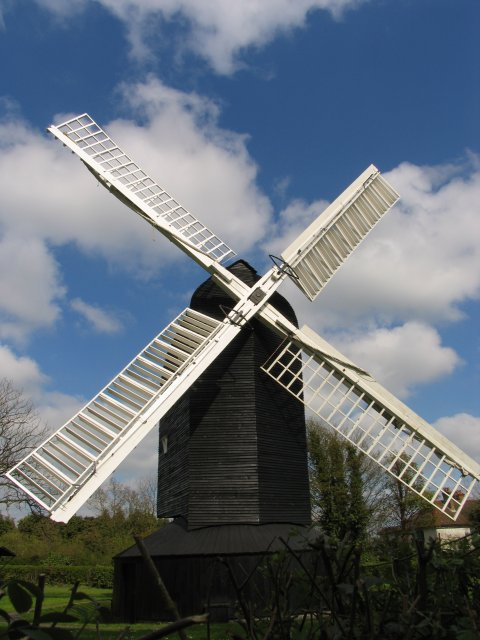
The 18th-century High Salvington Windmill, a post mill, has been restored and is operational.

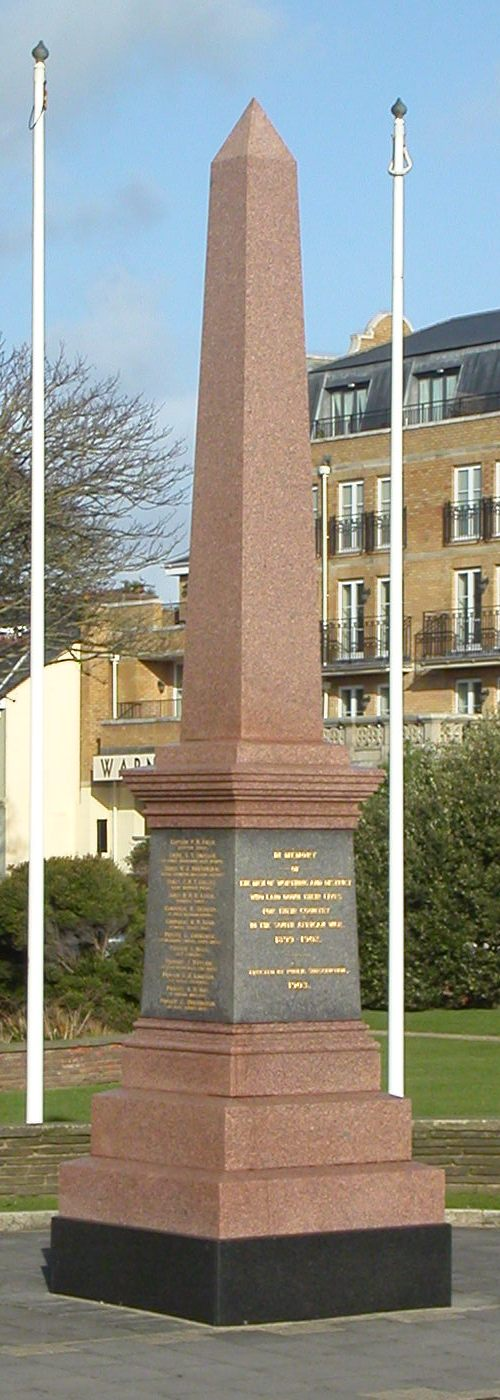
The war memorial at the Steyne commemorates victims of the Second Boer War.

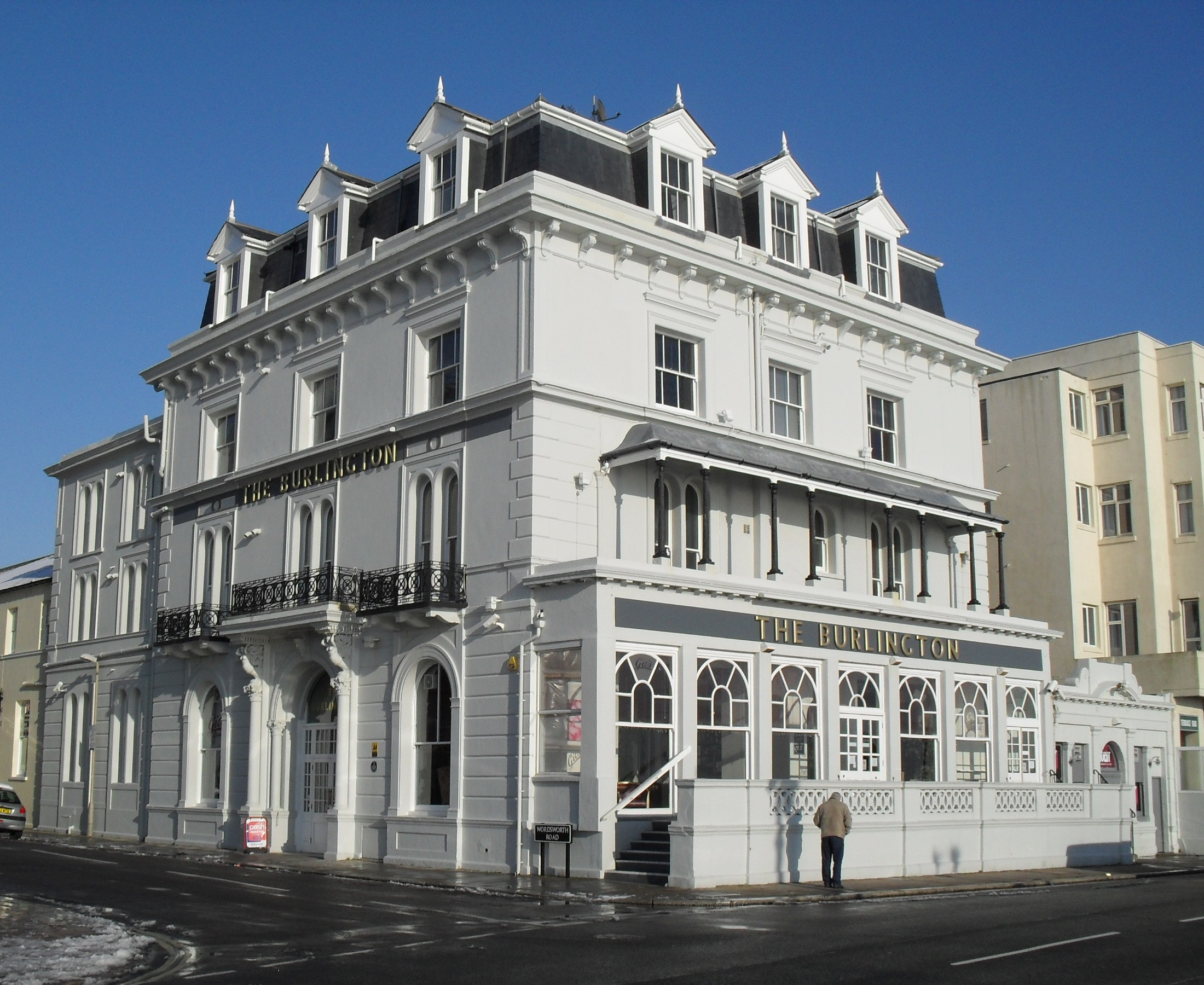
The Burlington Hotel, built in 1865, forms the south end of Heene Terrace.

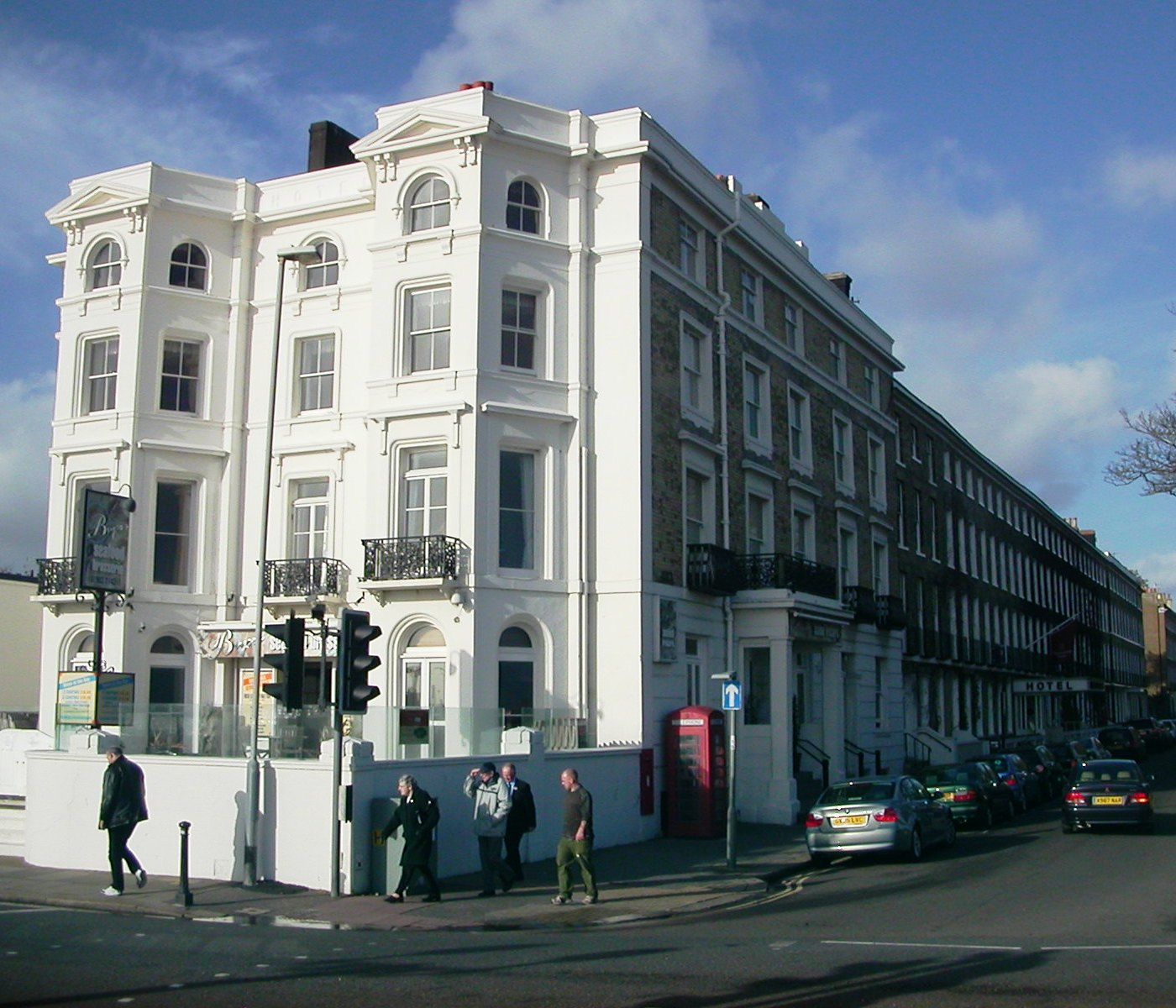
The Chatsworth Hotel is based in a four-storey terrace built in 1807.

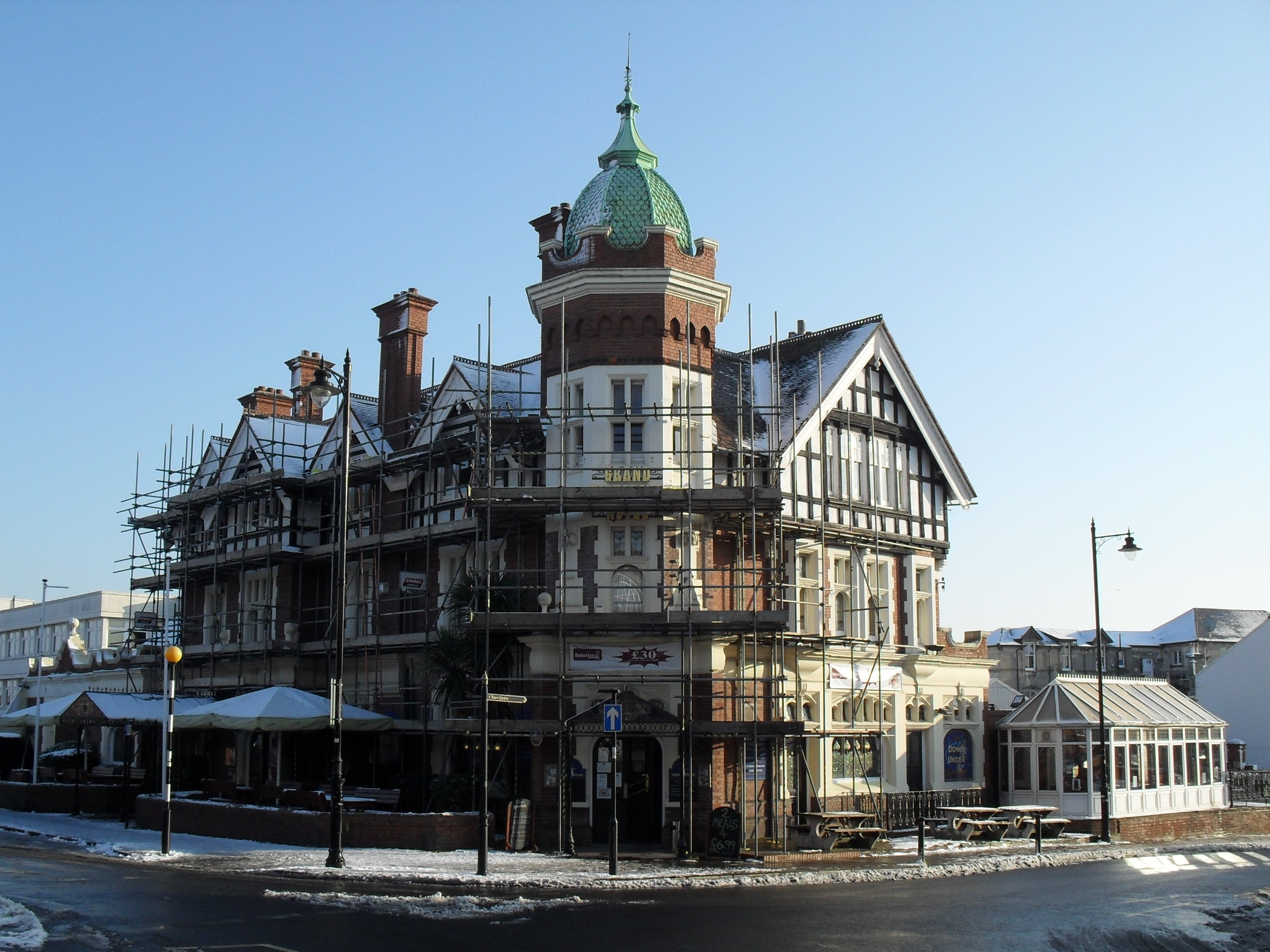
Chapman's Hotel (formerly Central Hotel) was originally the Worthing station hotel.

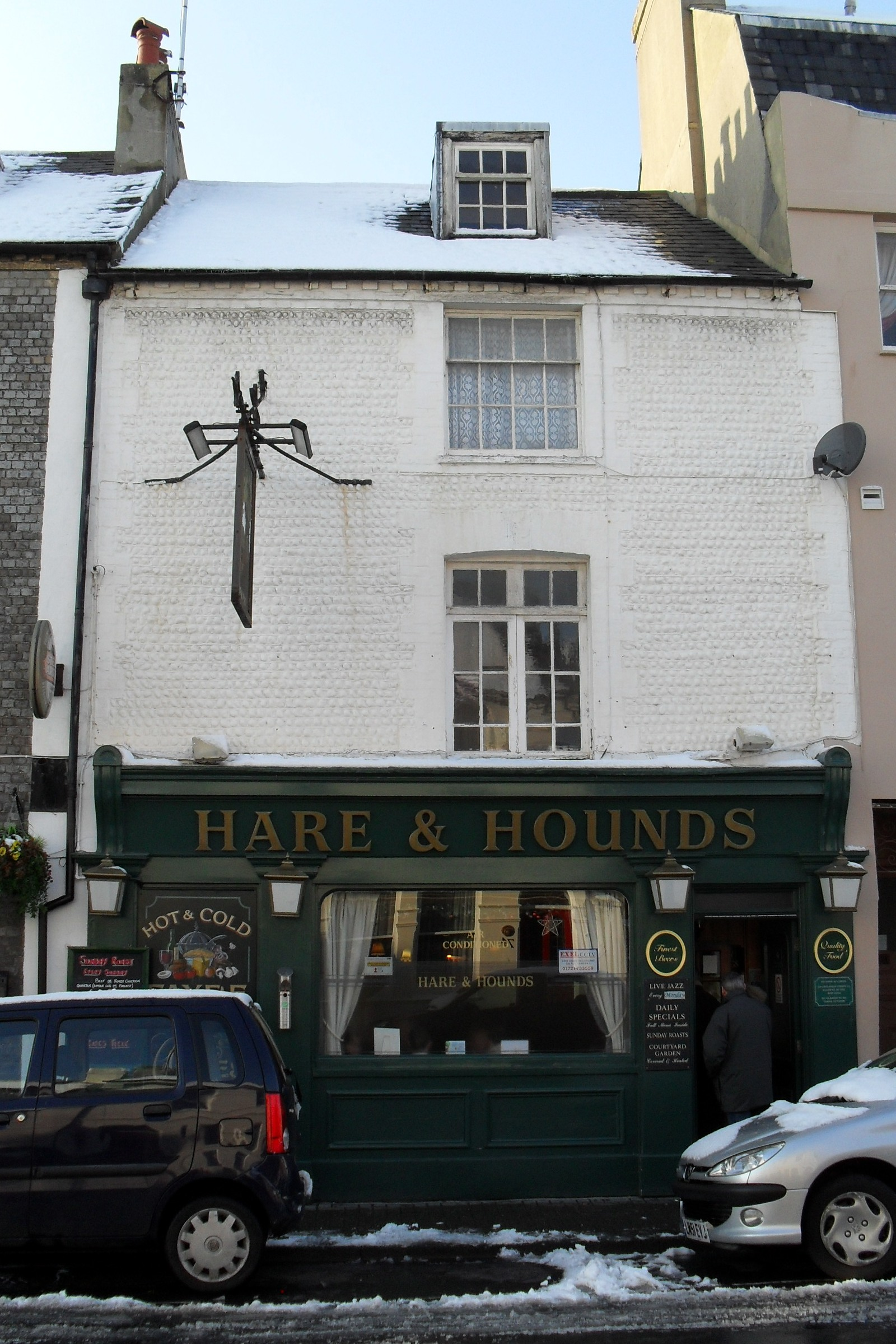
The Hare and Hounds Inn on Portland Road bore that name by 1852.

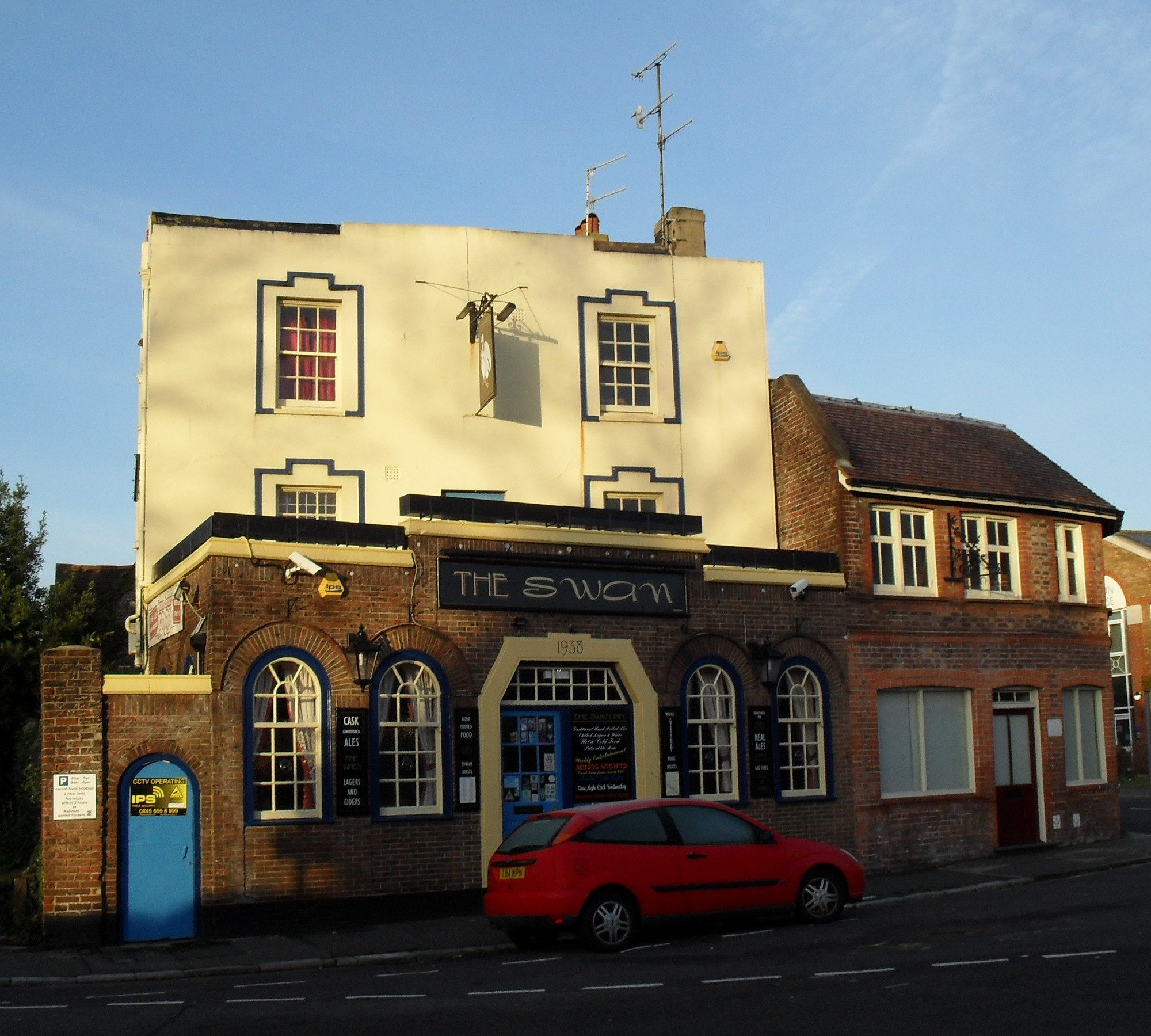
The Swan Inn has been extended several times since its late-18th-century origins.

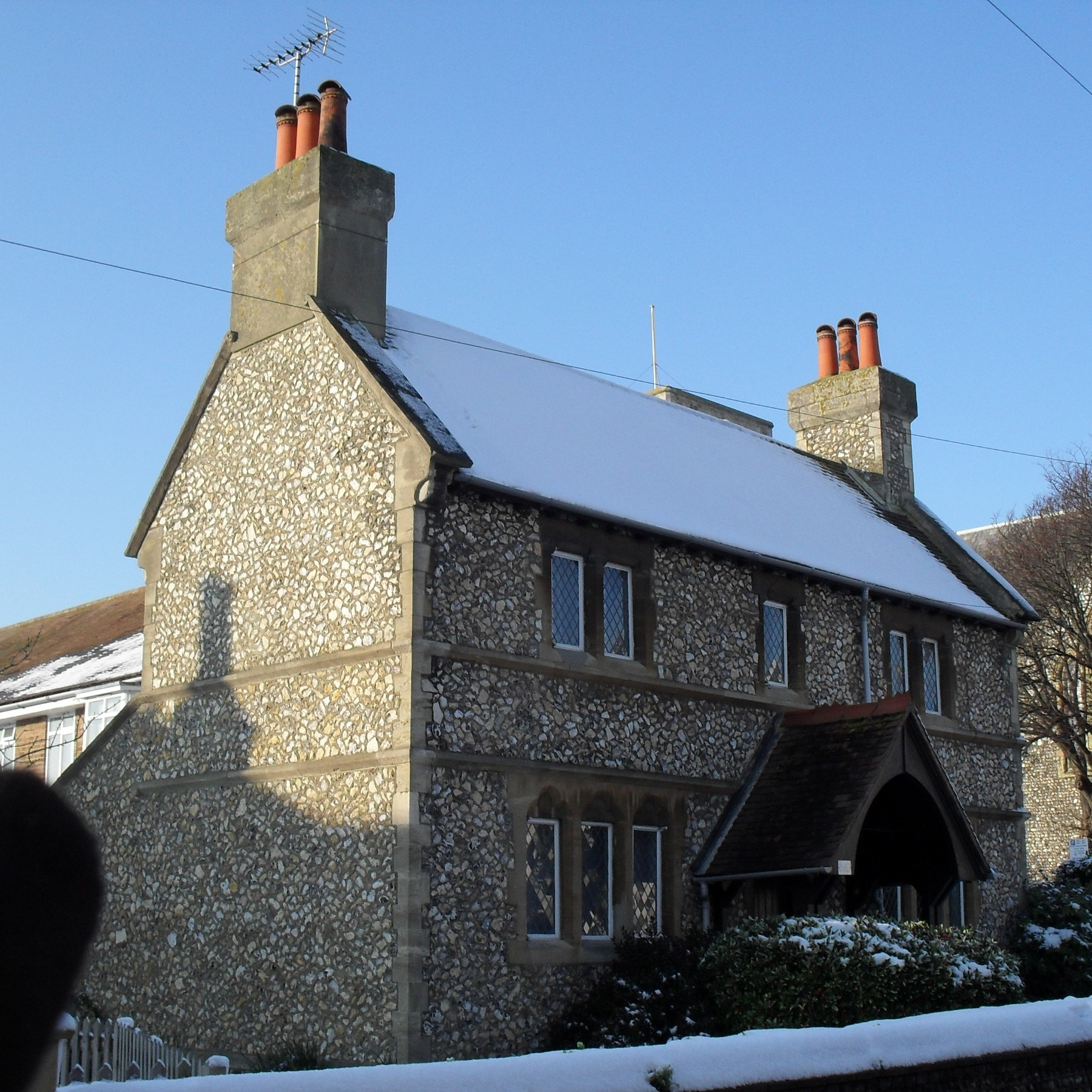
These almshouses on Humphrys Road date from 1868.

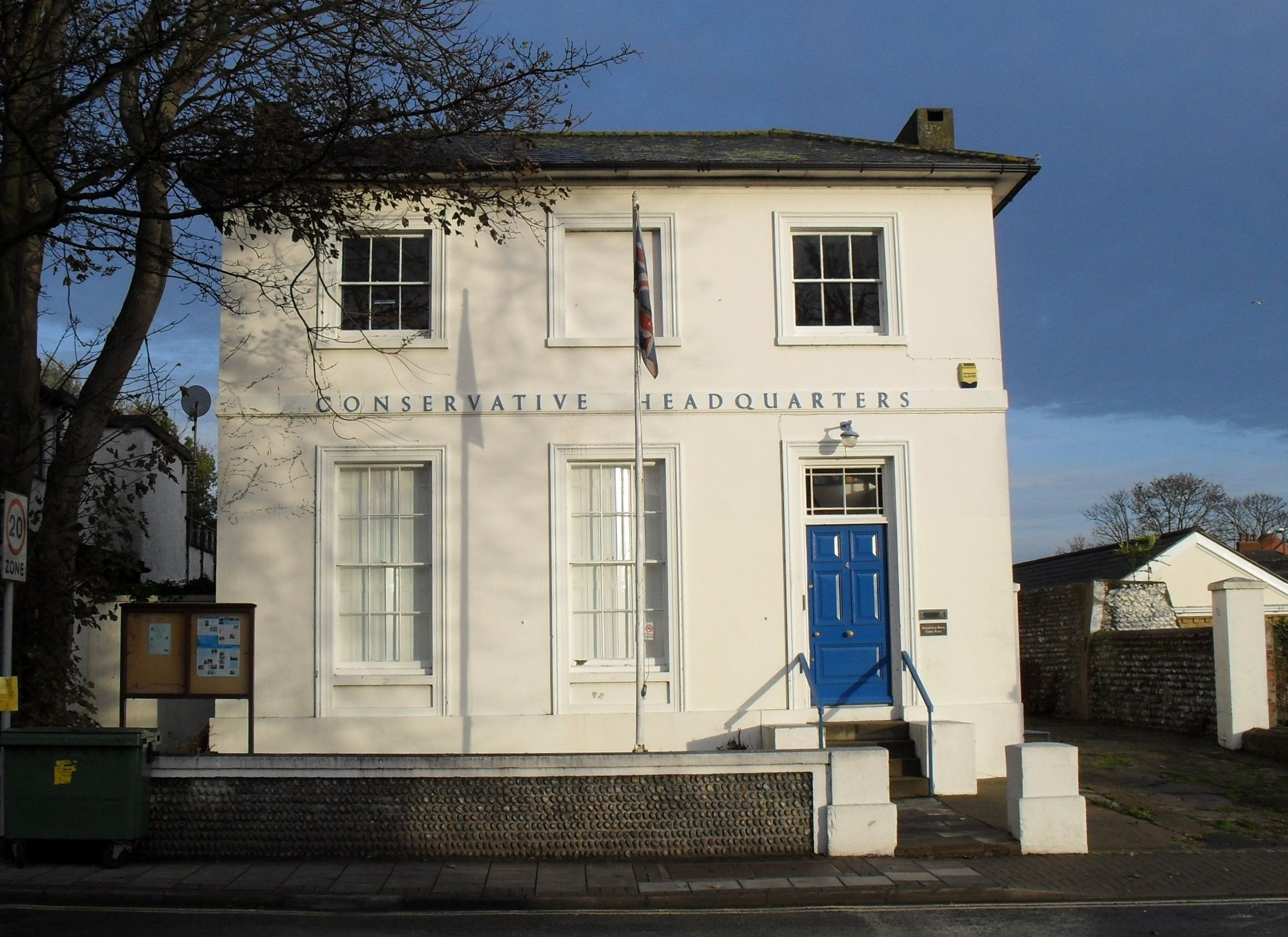
A mid-19th-century stuccoed building housed Worthing's Conservative Party headquarters.

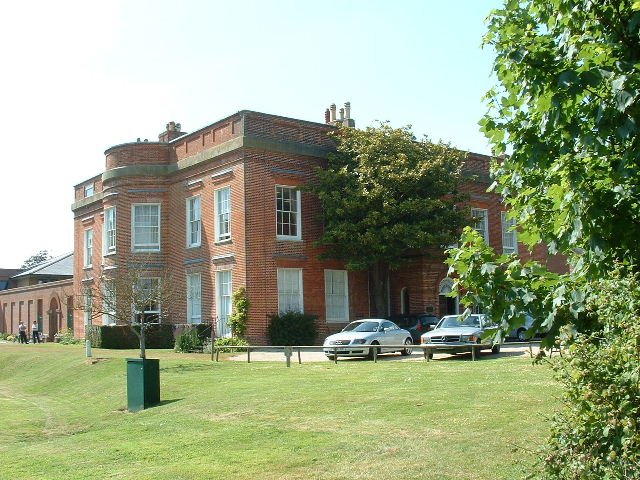
Goring Hall has been converted into a private hospital.

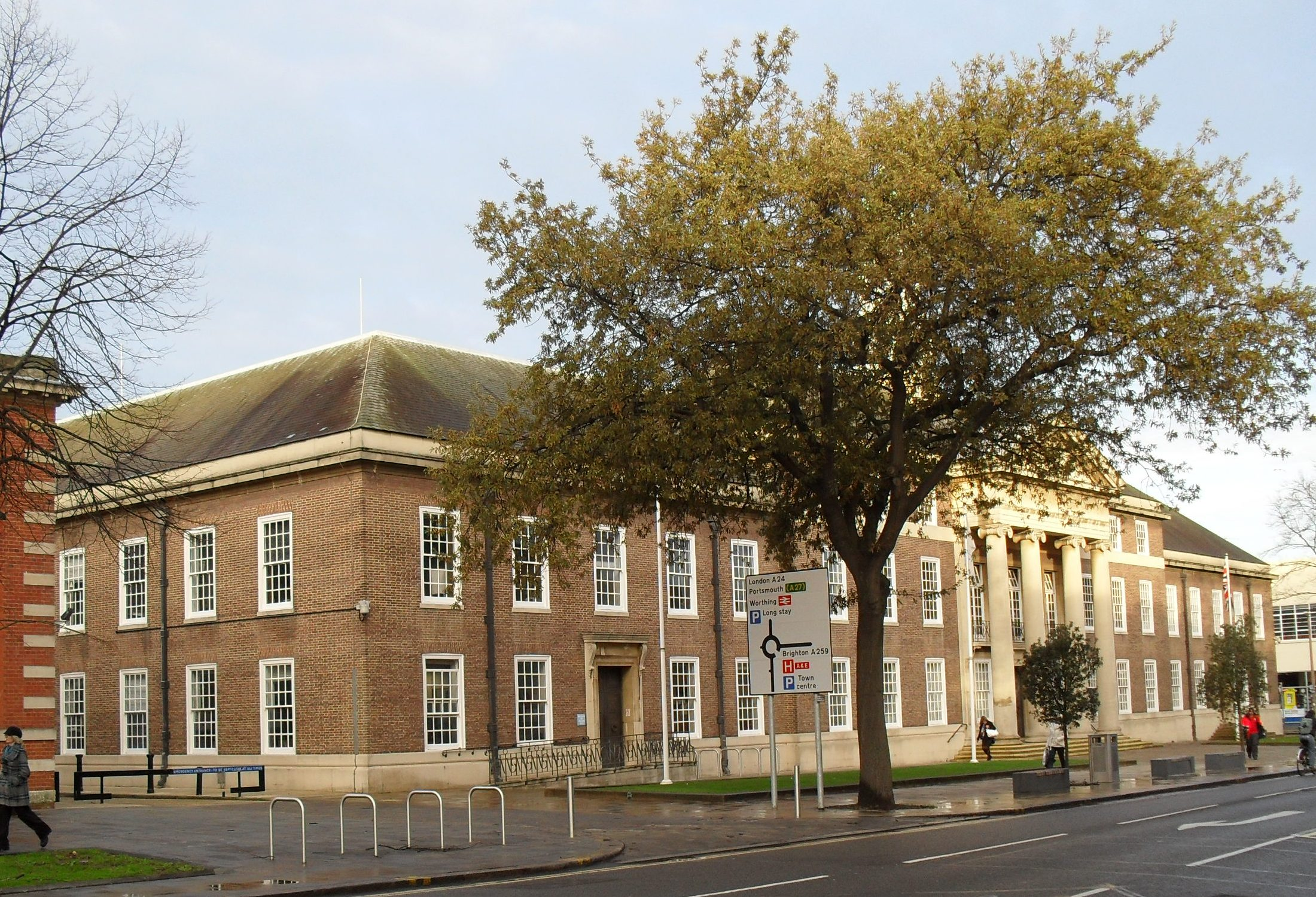
Charles Cowles-Voysey built Worthing's new town hall and assembly rooms in 1933–34.

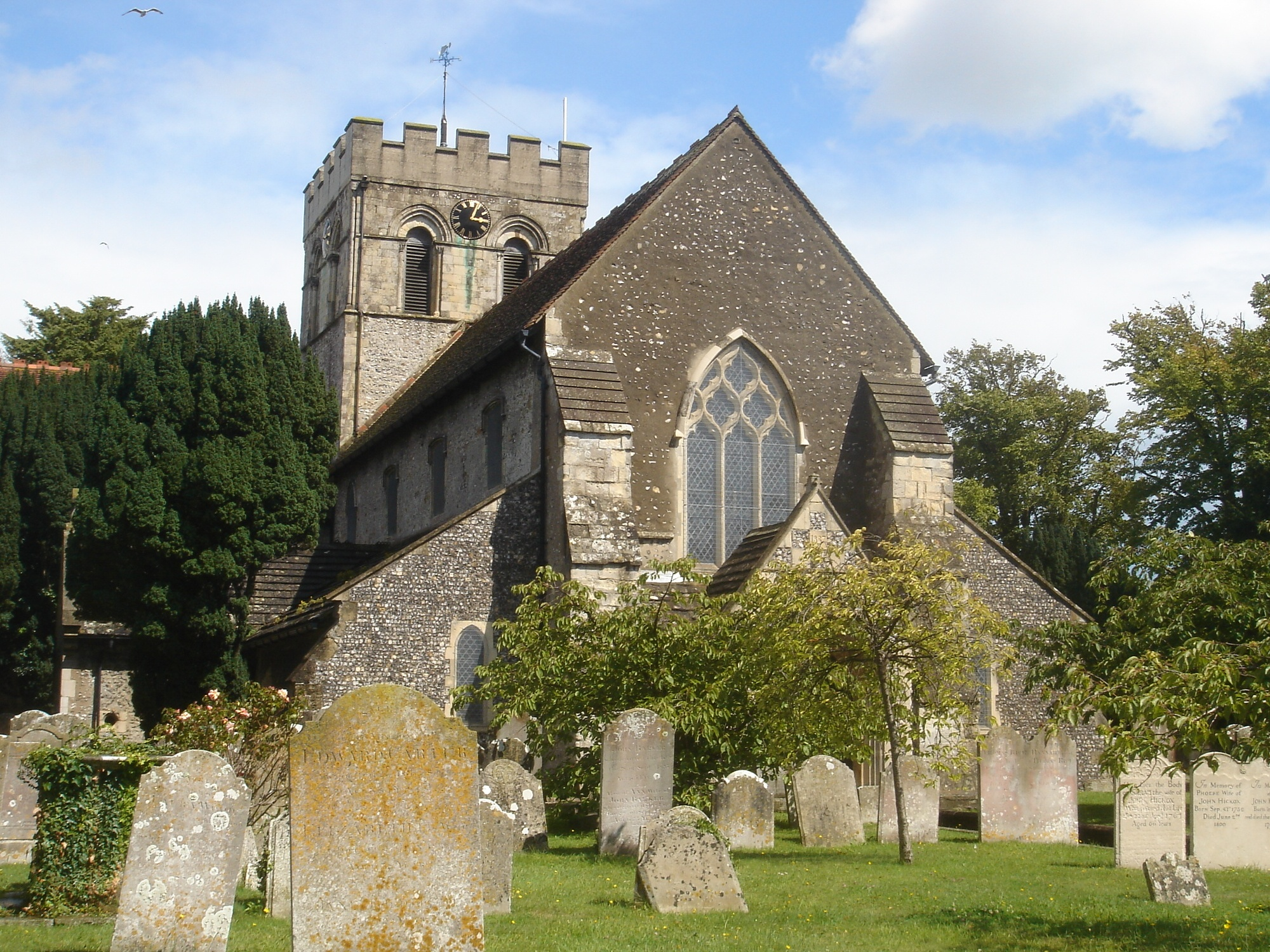
St Mary's Church has served the Broadwater area since Saxon times.

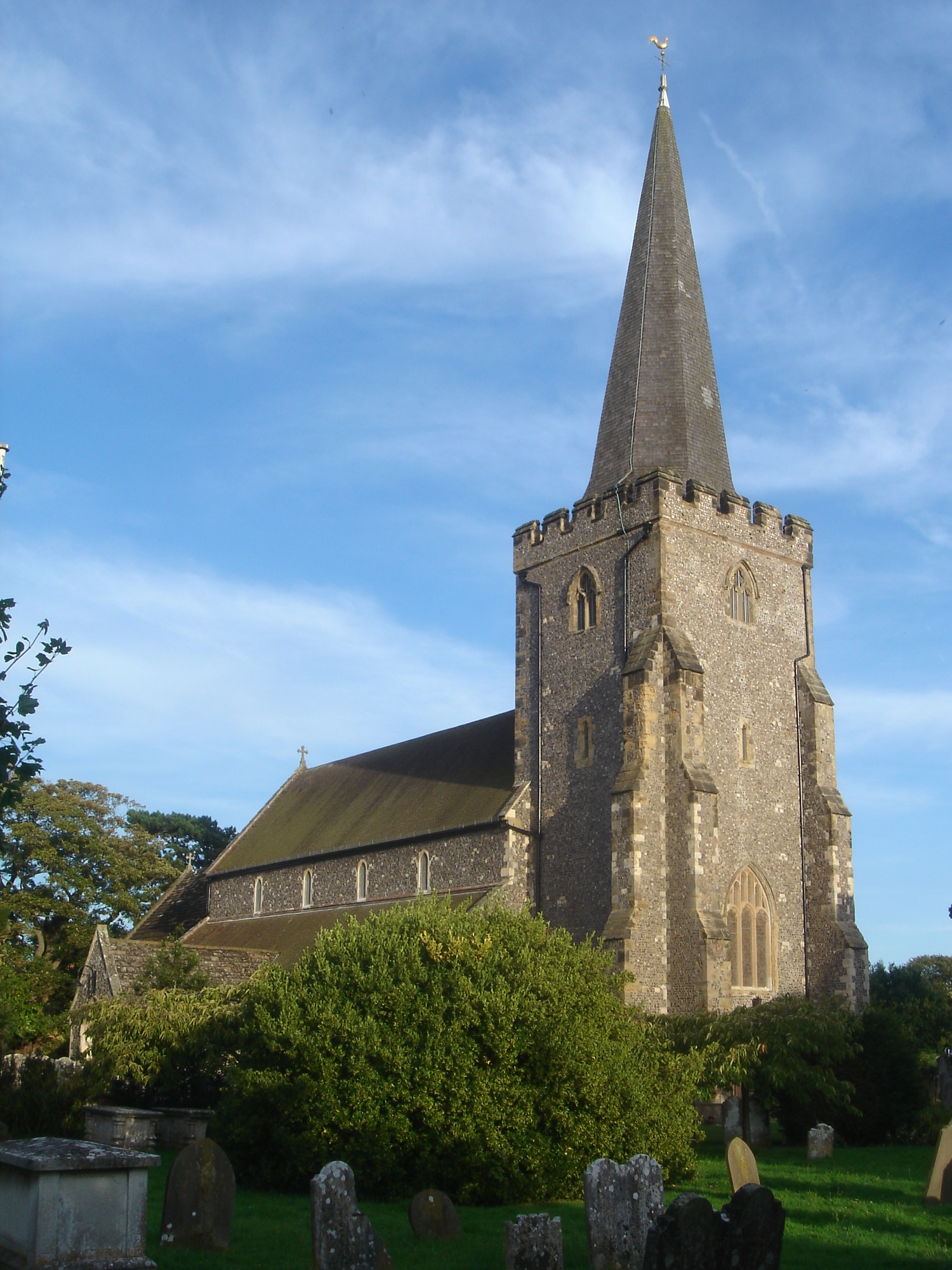
John Selden was baptised at St Andrew's Church in West Tarring.

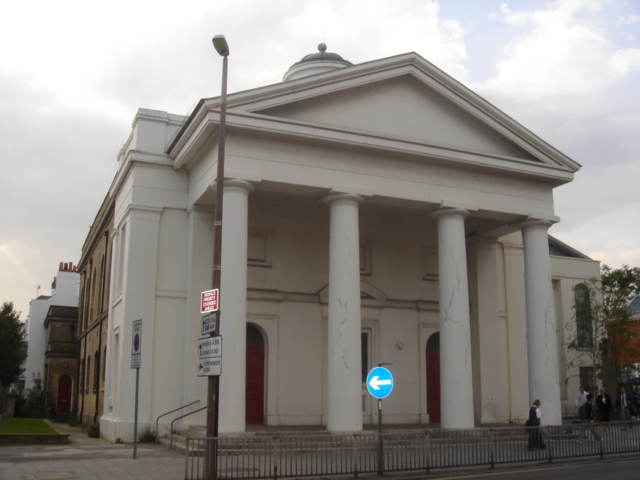
St Paul's Church, Worthing's first Anglican church, was built in 1812 but closed in 1995.

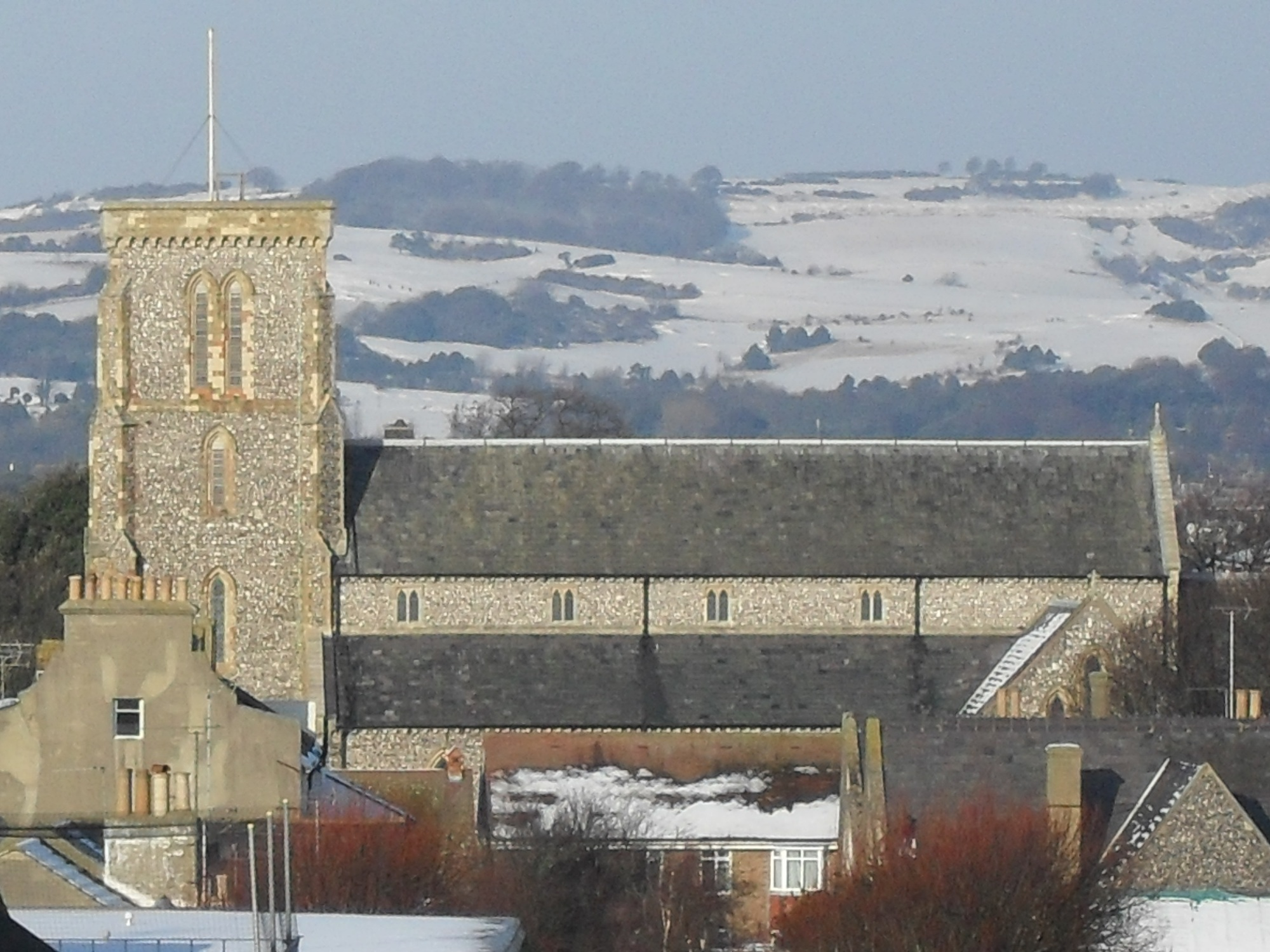
Christ Church was the second Anglican church built in Worthing, three decades after St Paul's.

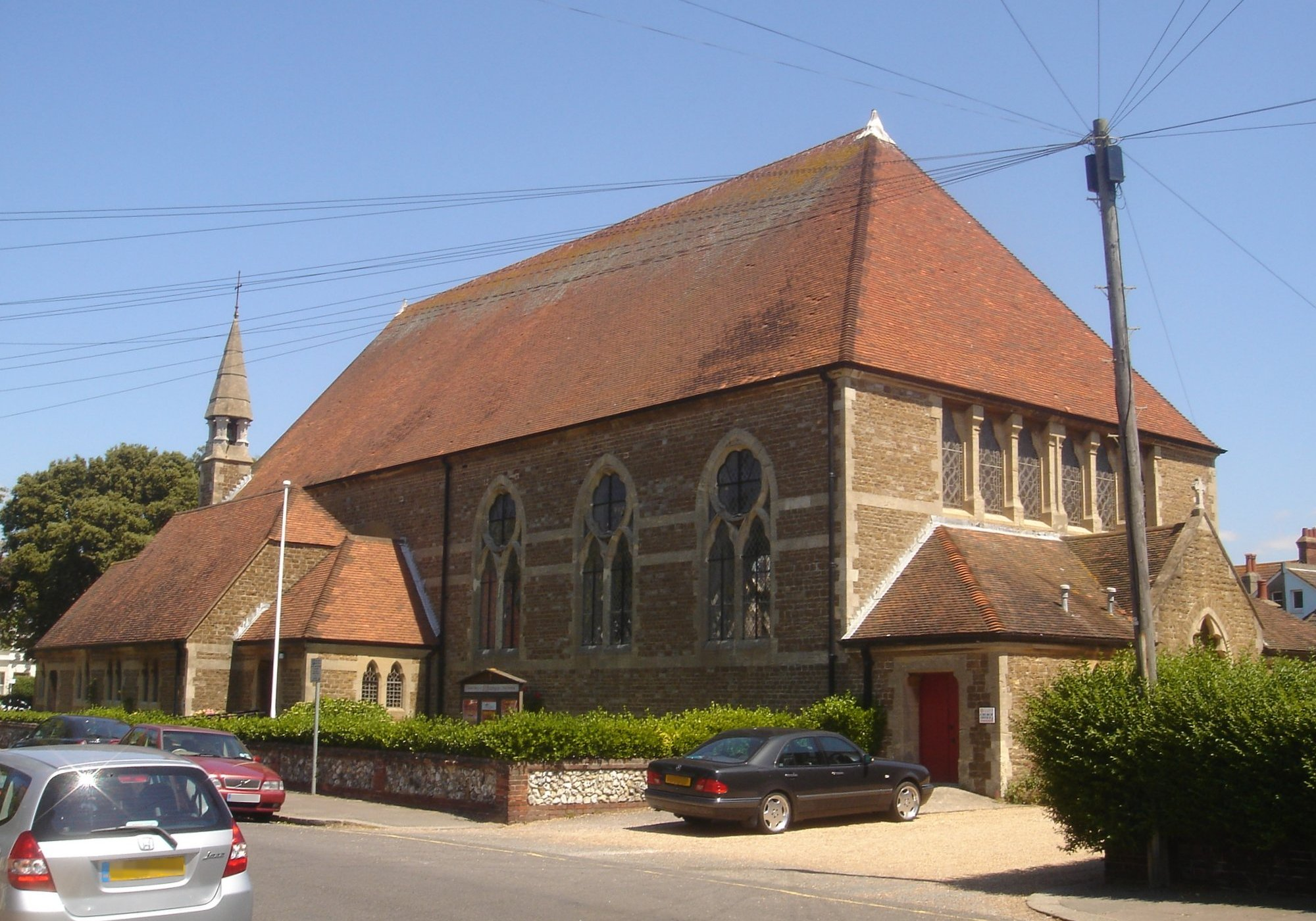
George Truefitt's design for St George's Church in East Worthing made use of brown Bargate stone.

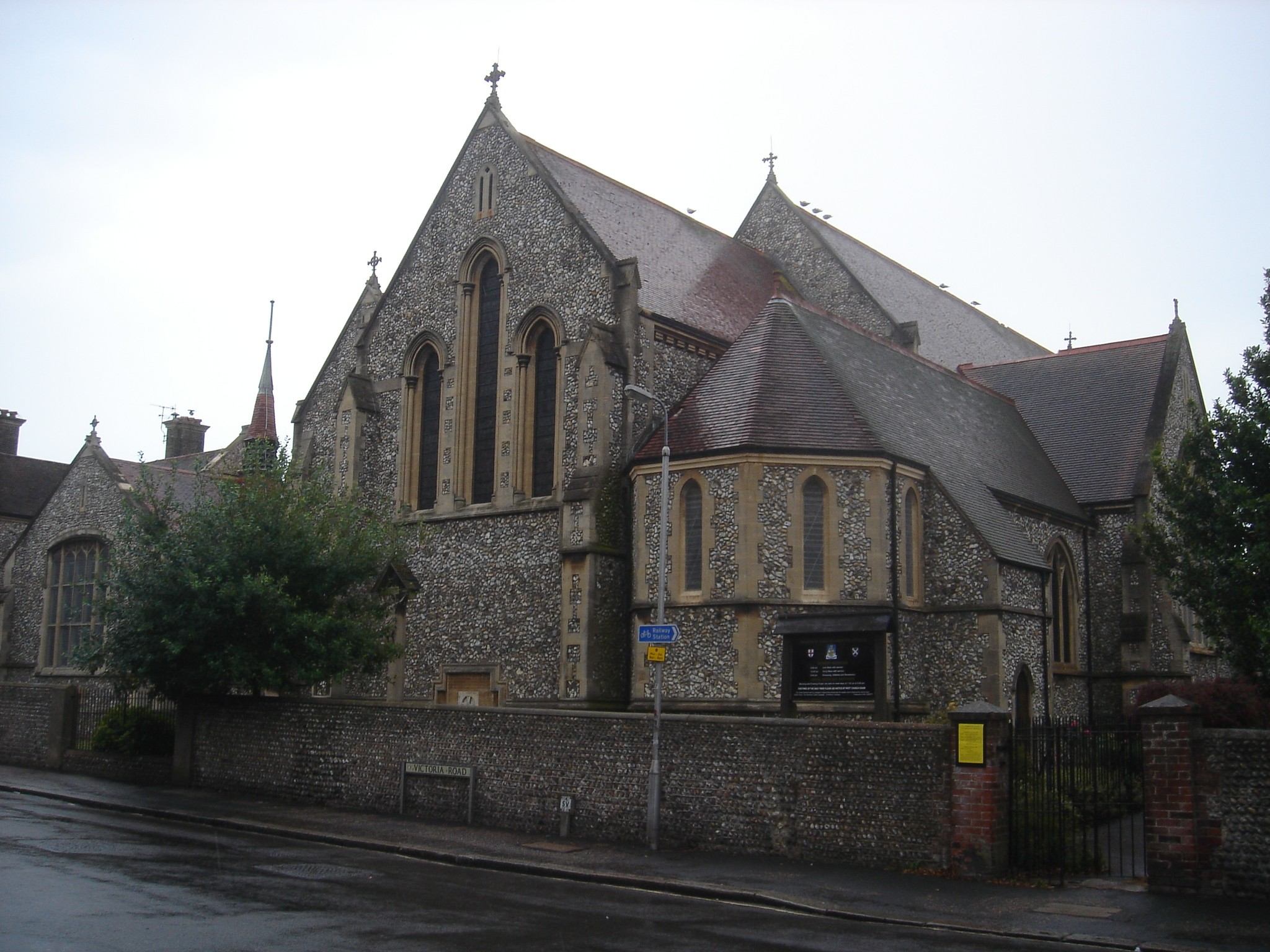
St Andrew's Church in central Worthing is an Early English-style flint building with many lancet windows.

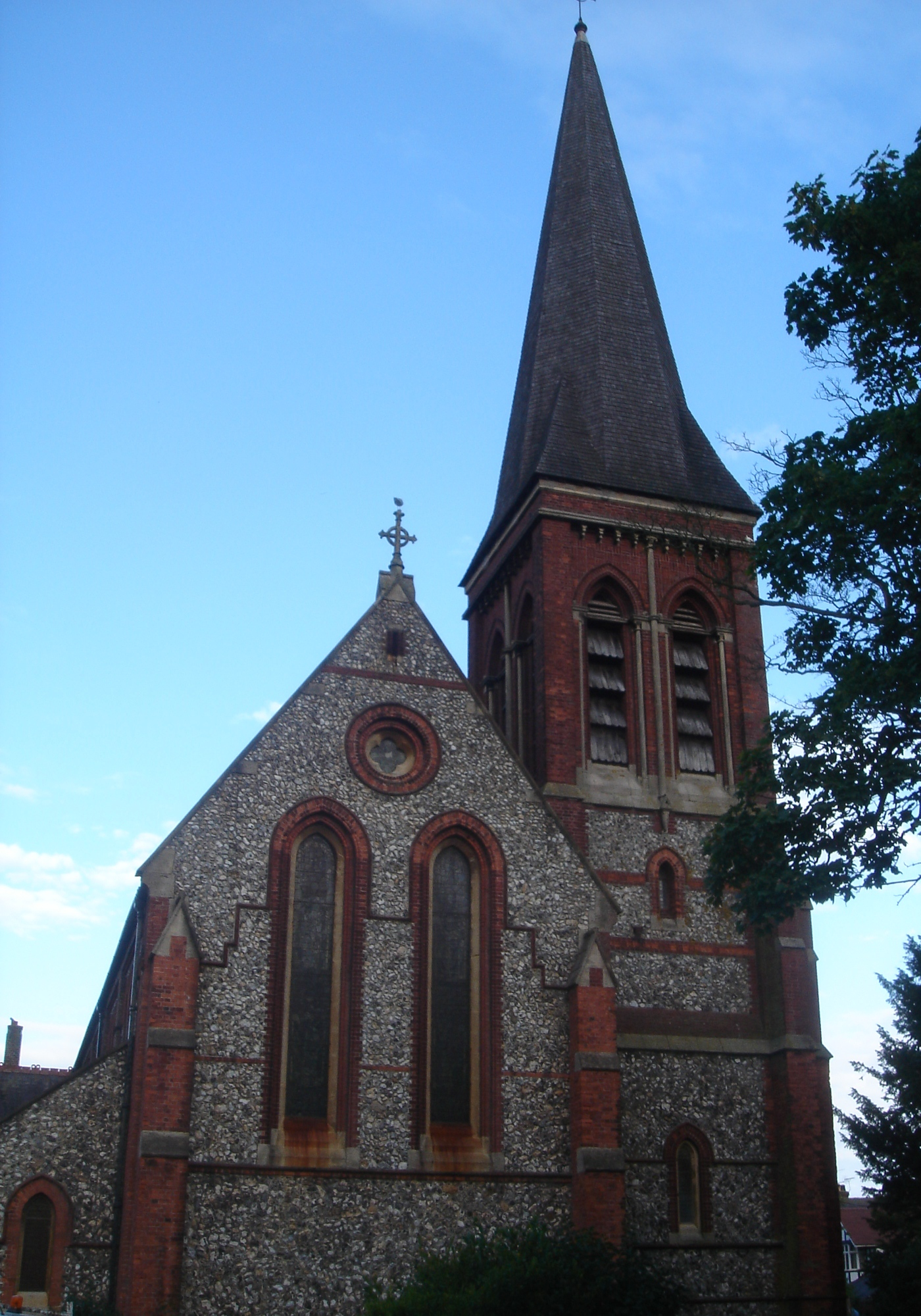
St Botolph's Church was built to replace the ruined former church of that dedication on the same site.

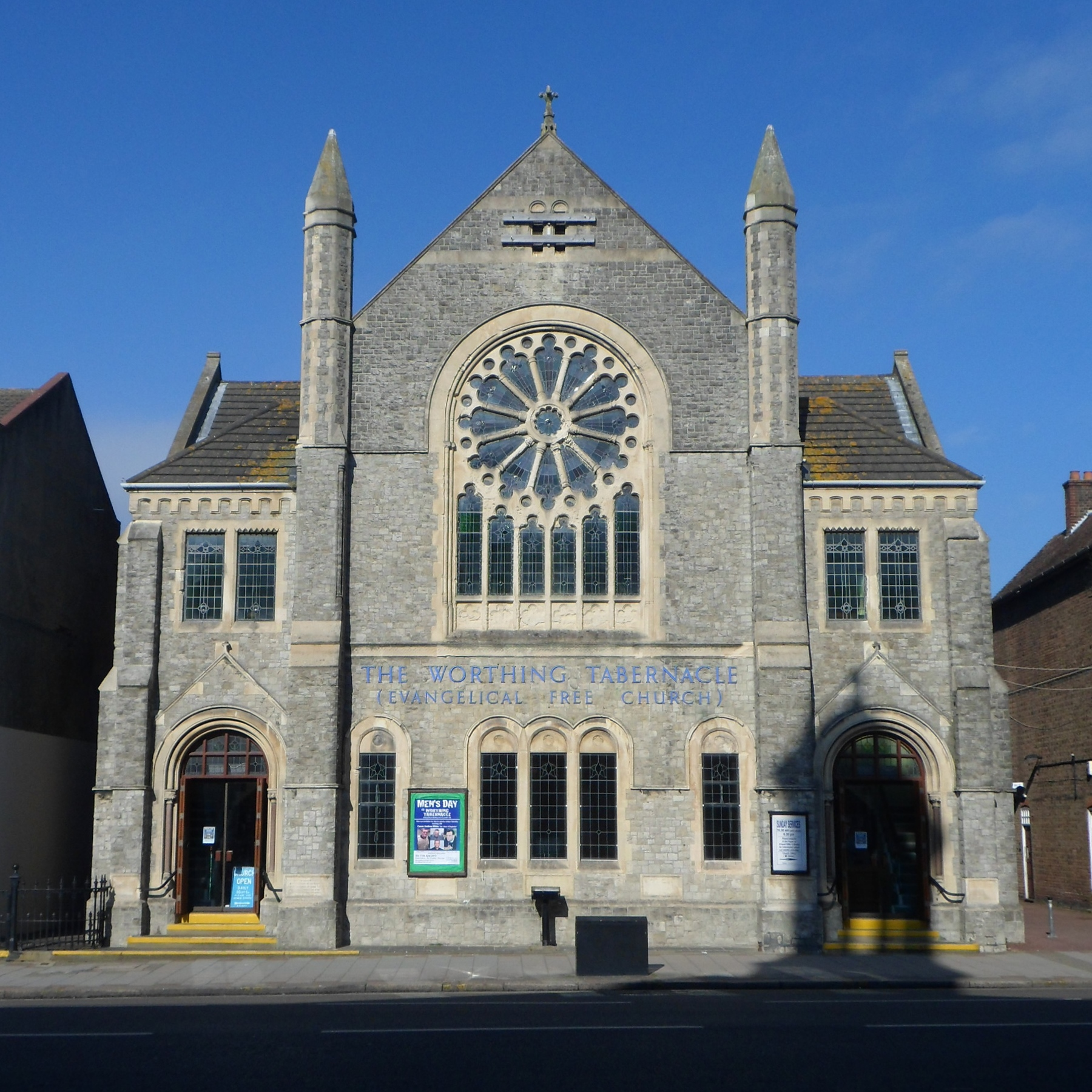
The Worthing Tabernacle, opposite the town hall, was founded in 1895 and moved to this building in 1908.

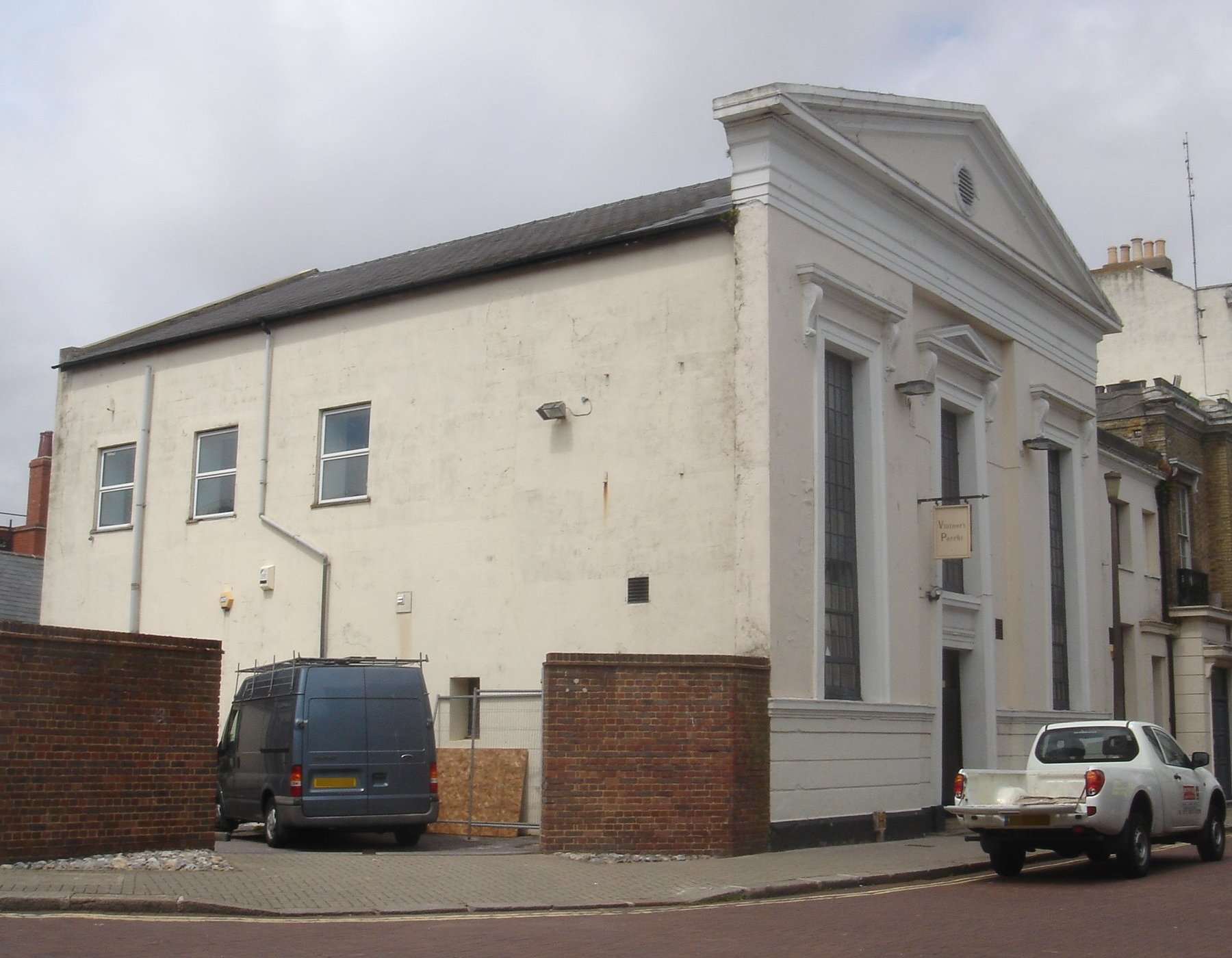
Now part of the adjacent Vintners Parrot pub, Bedford Hall was built for Wesleyan Methodist worshippers in 1839.

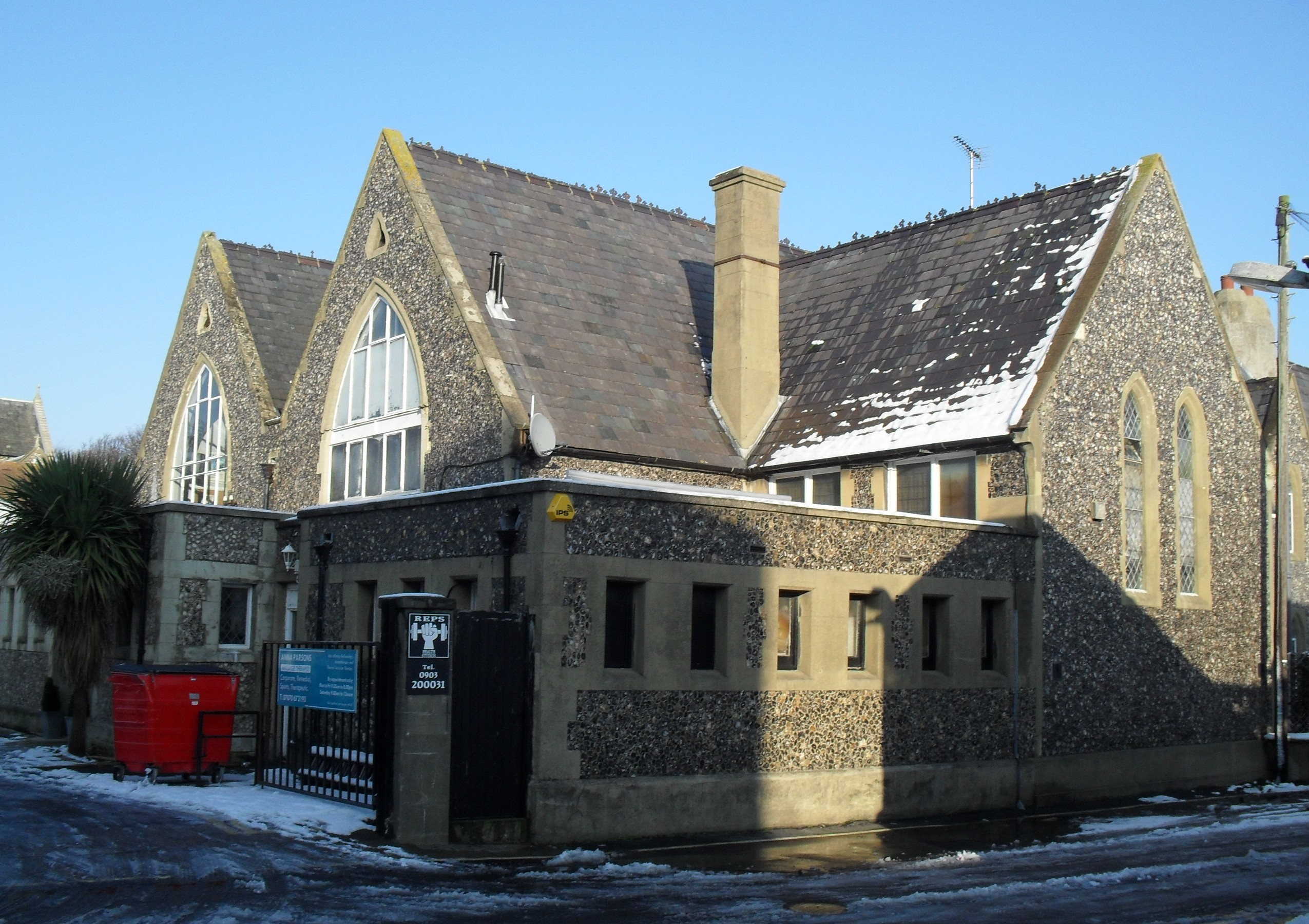
The former Christ Church school, opposite that church, was built in 1861.

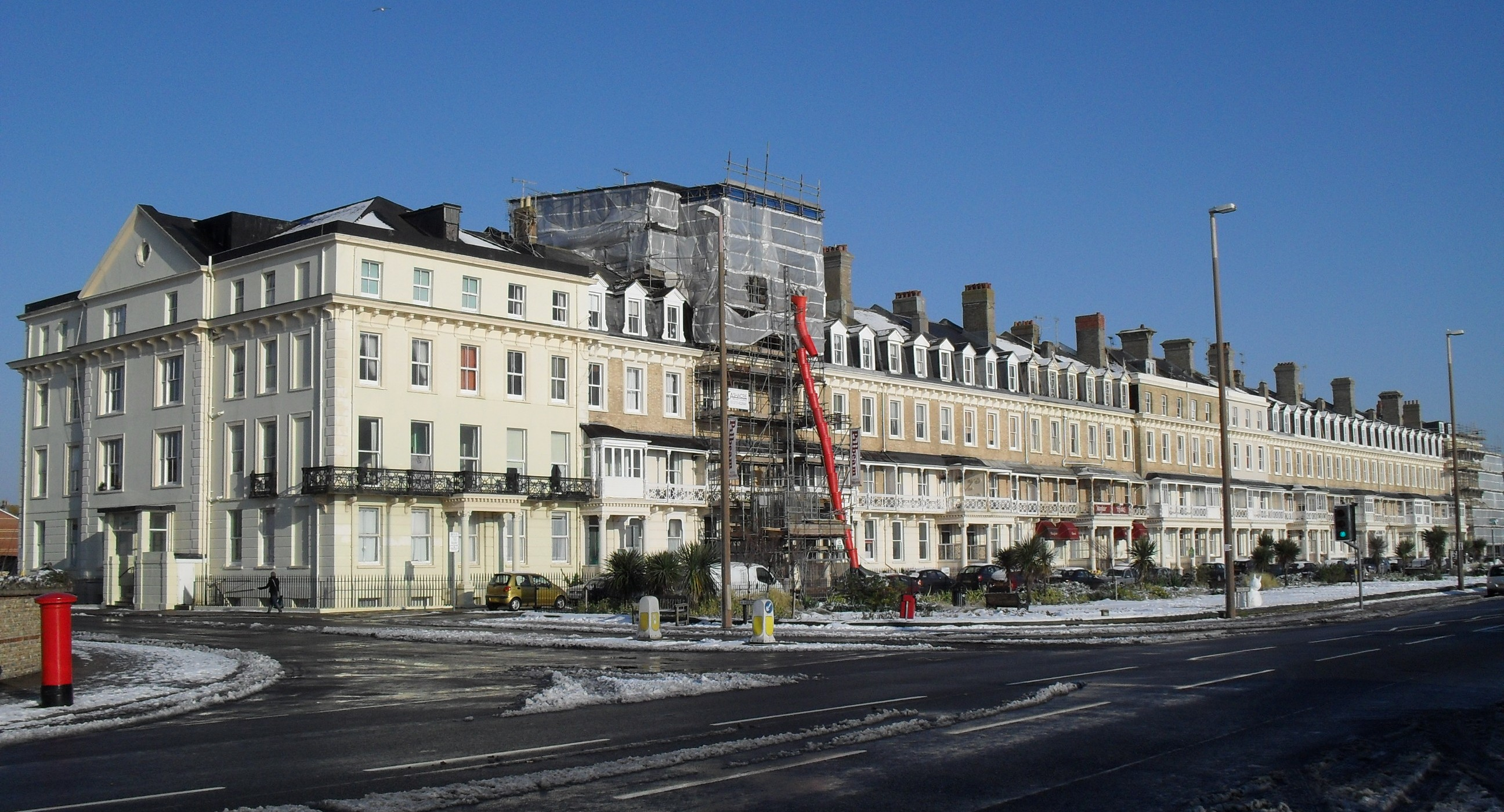
Heene Terrace was part of a major building scheme west of Worthing in the mid-19th century.

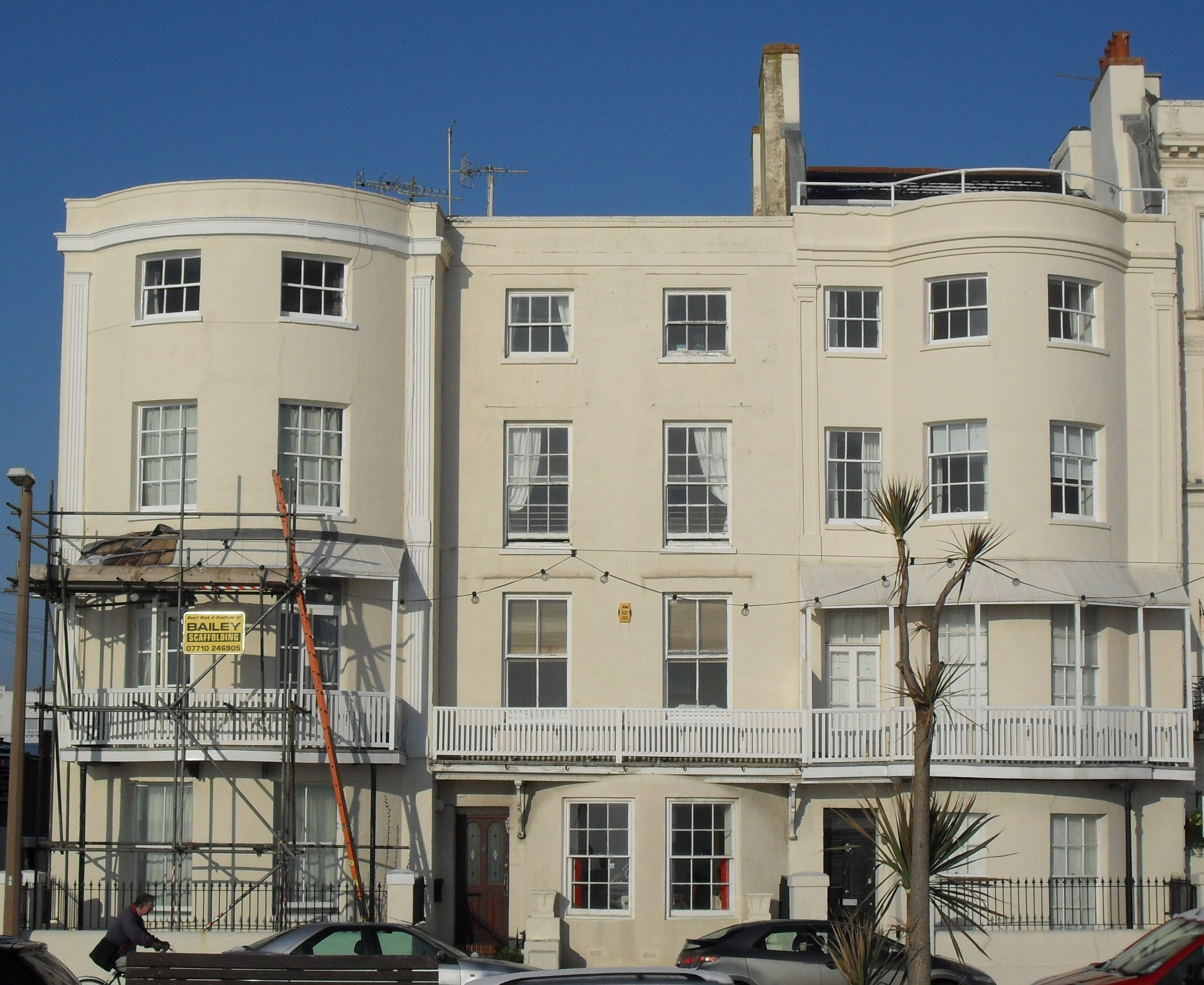
From right to left, numbers 74, 75 and 76 Marine Parade form part of an early-19th-century terrace.

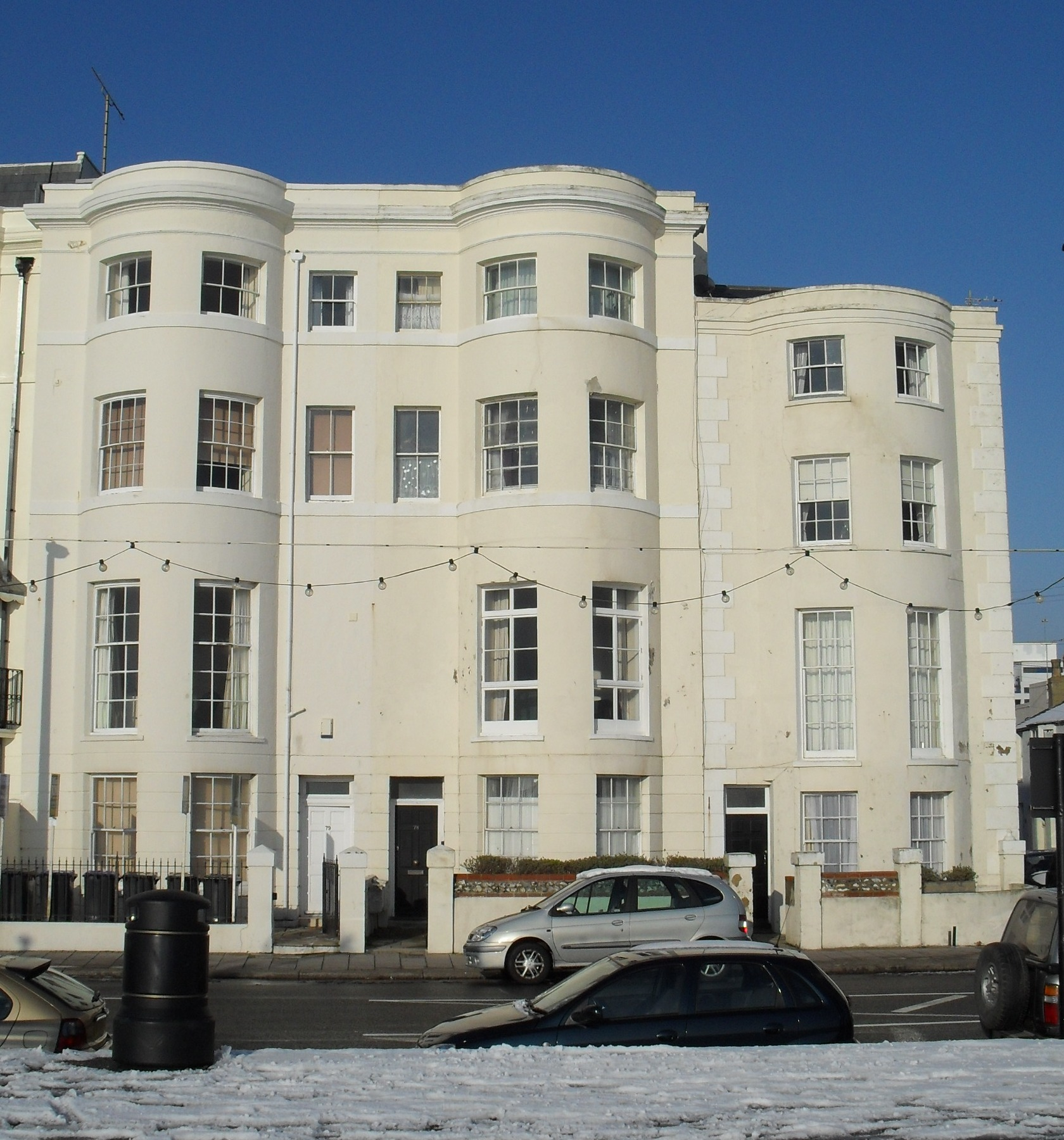
The bow-fronted houses at 77–79 Marine Parade are also early-19th-century.

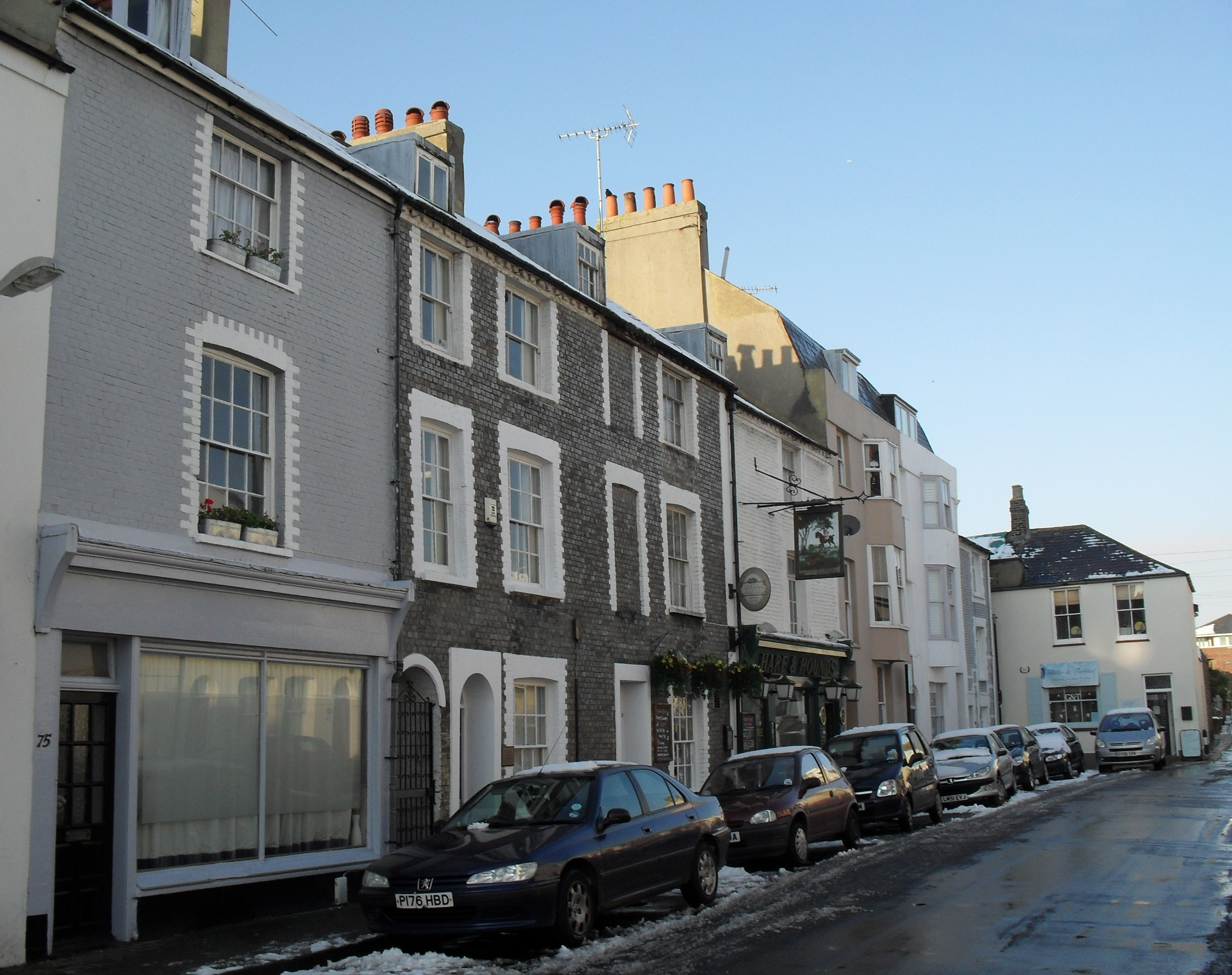
Six listed buildings on Portland Road—from number 75 (foreground) to number 89—are shown here.

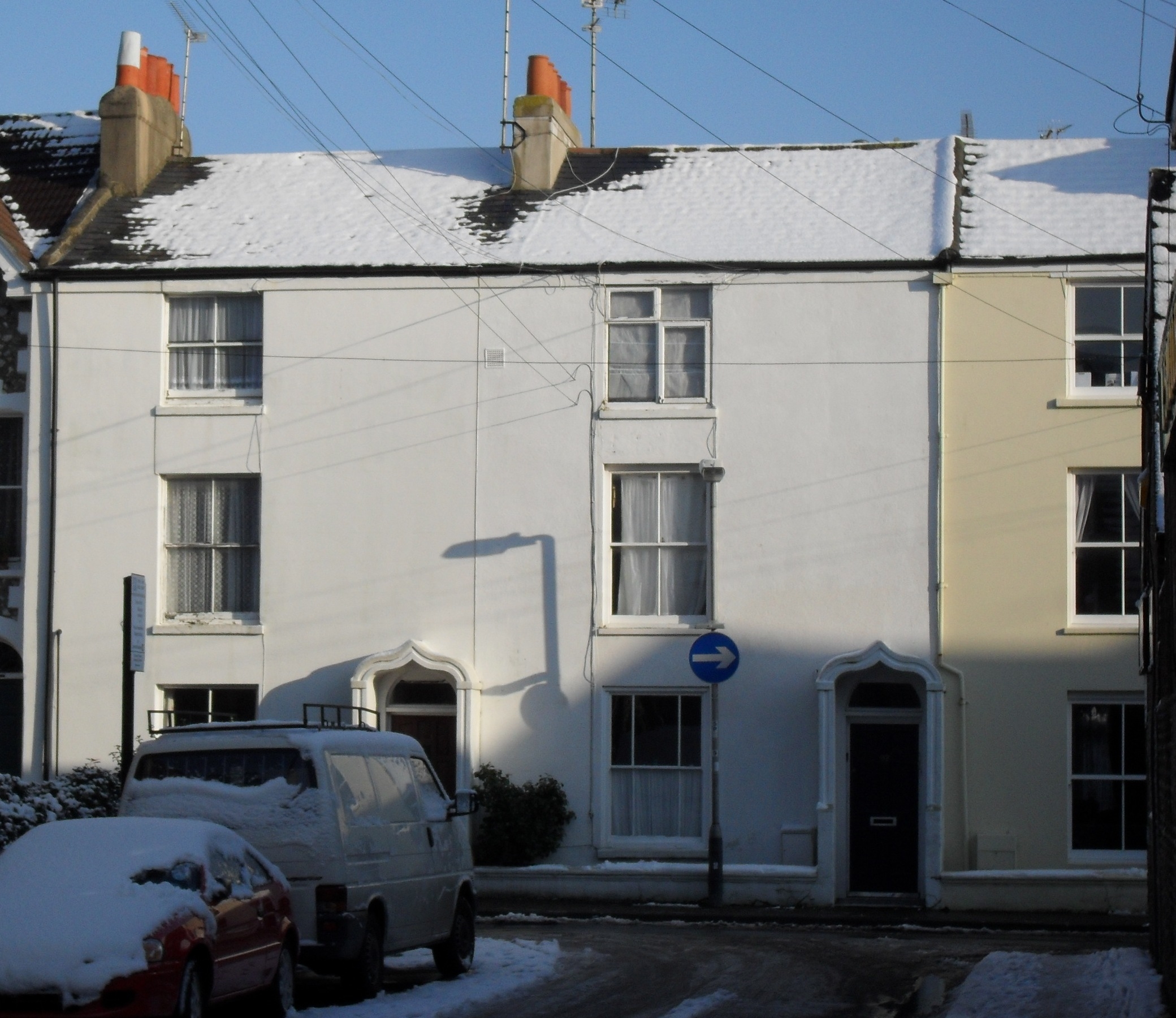
90 (partly obscured), 92 and 94 Portland Road all have boat porches.

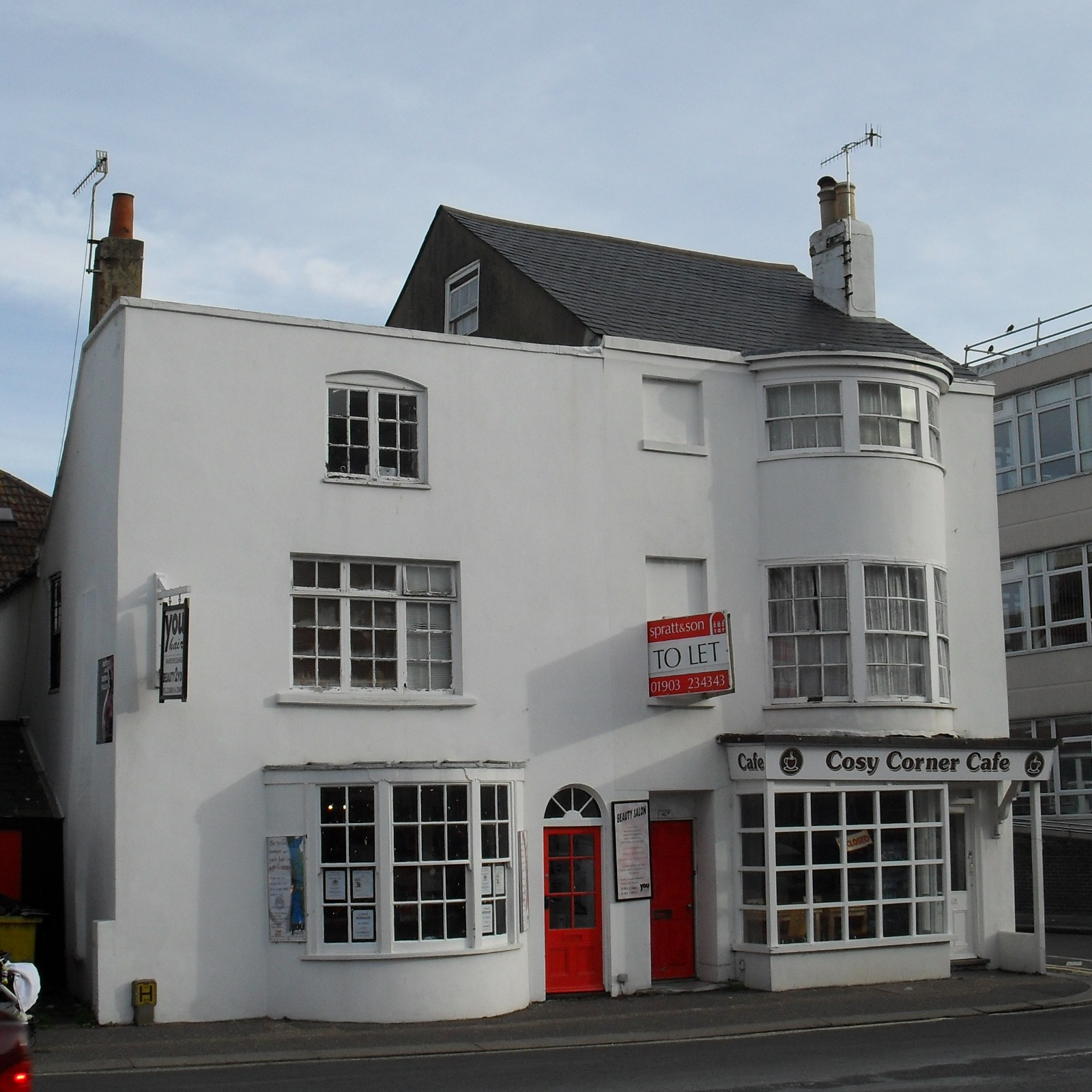
40/40A (right) and 42 (left) High Street are early-19th-century survivors on the High Street in central Worthing. 40 High Street is the oldest building in the town centre

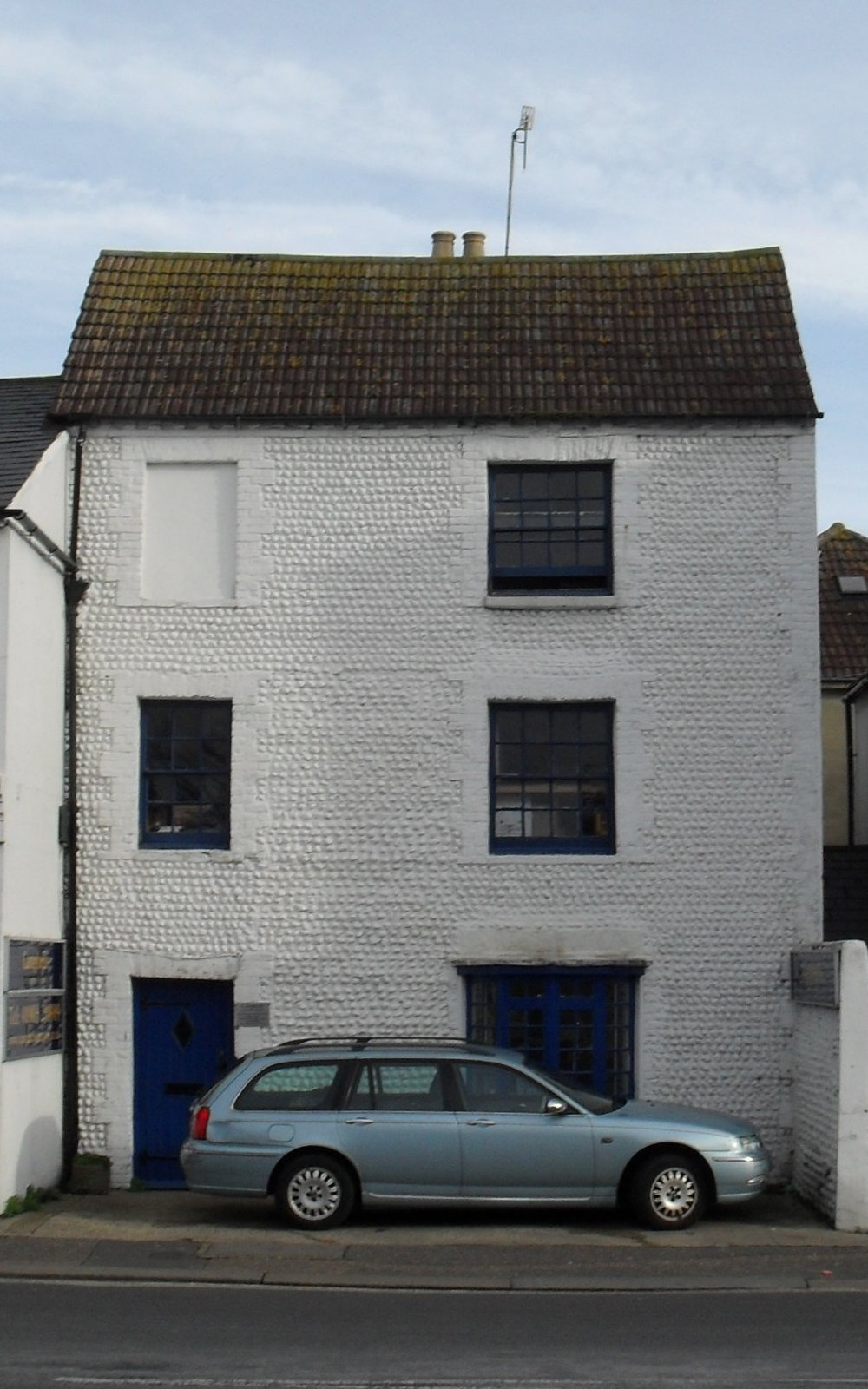
The neighbouring cobble-fronted cottage, which is now on what would have been no 40s garden.

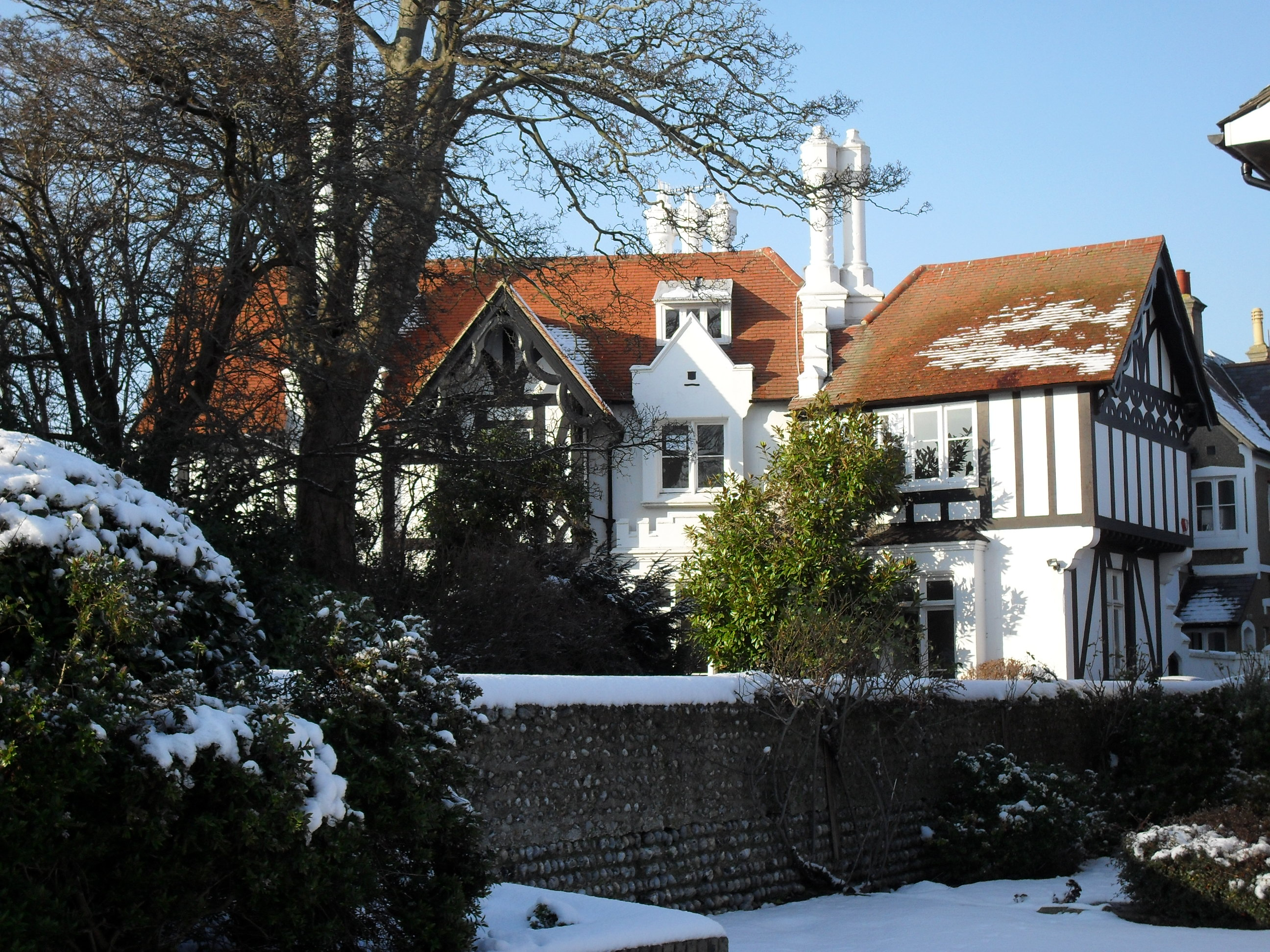
This Tudor Revival villa has been divided into flats—52, 52A and 52B Richmond Road.

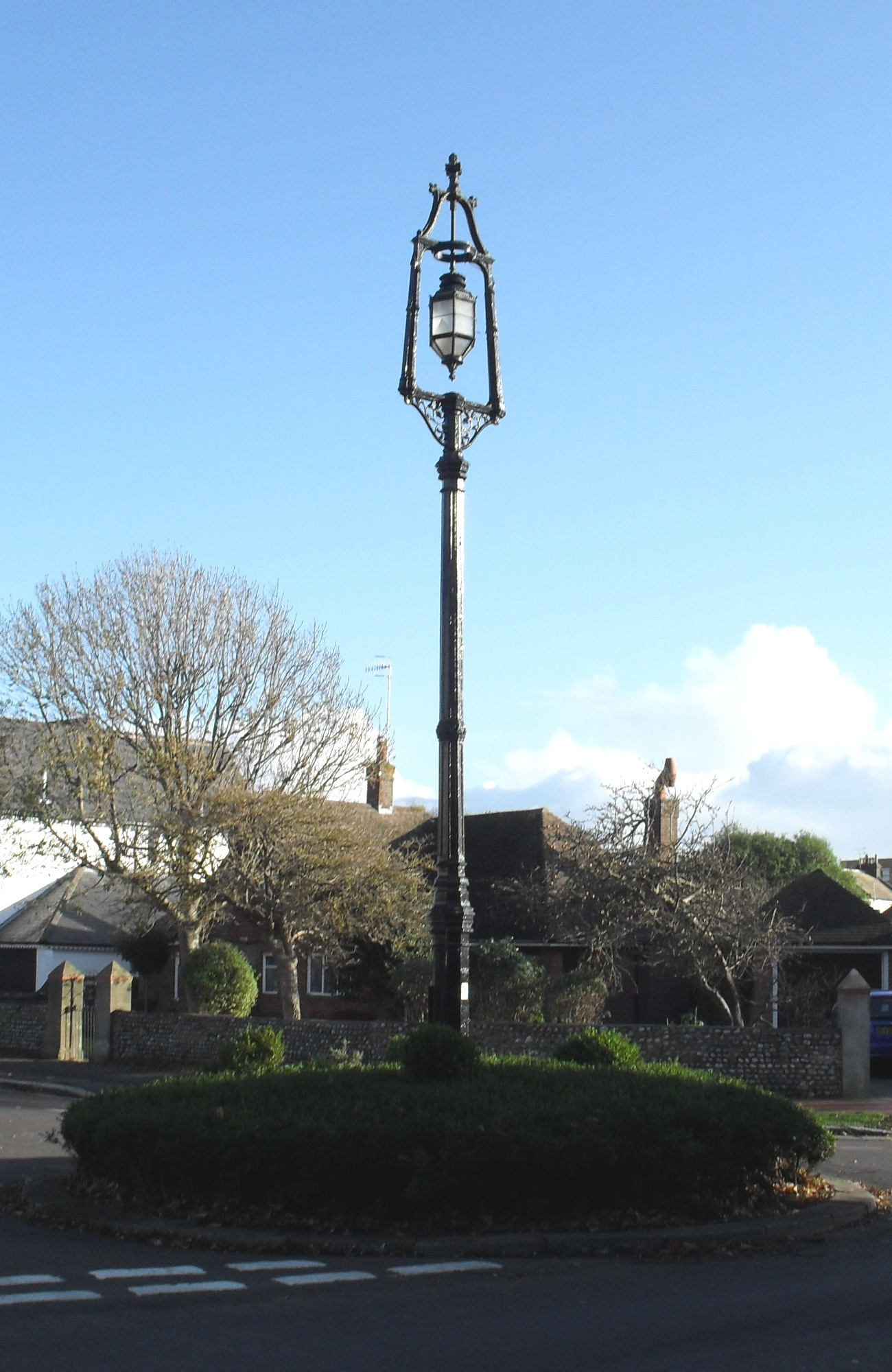
This lamp-post dates from 1901 and is the only surviving example in the borough.

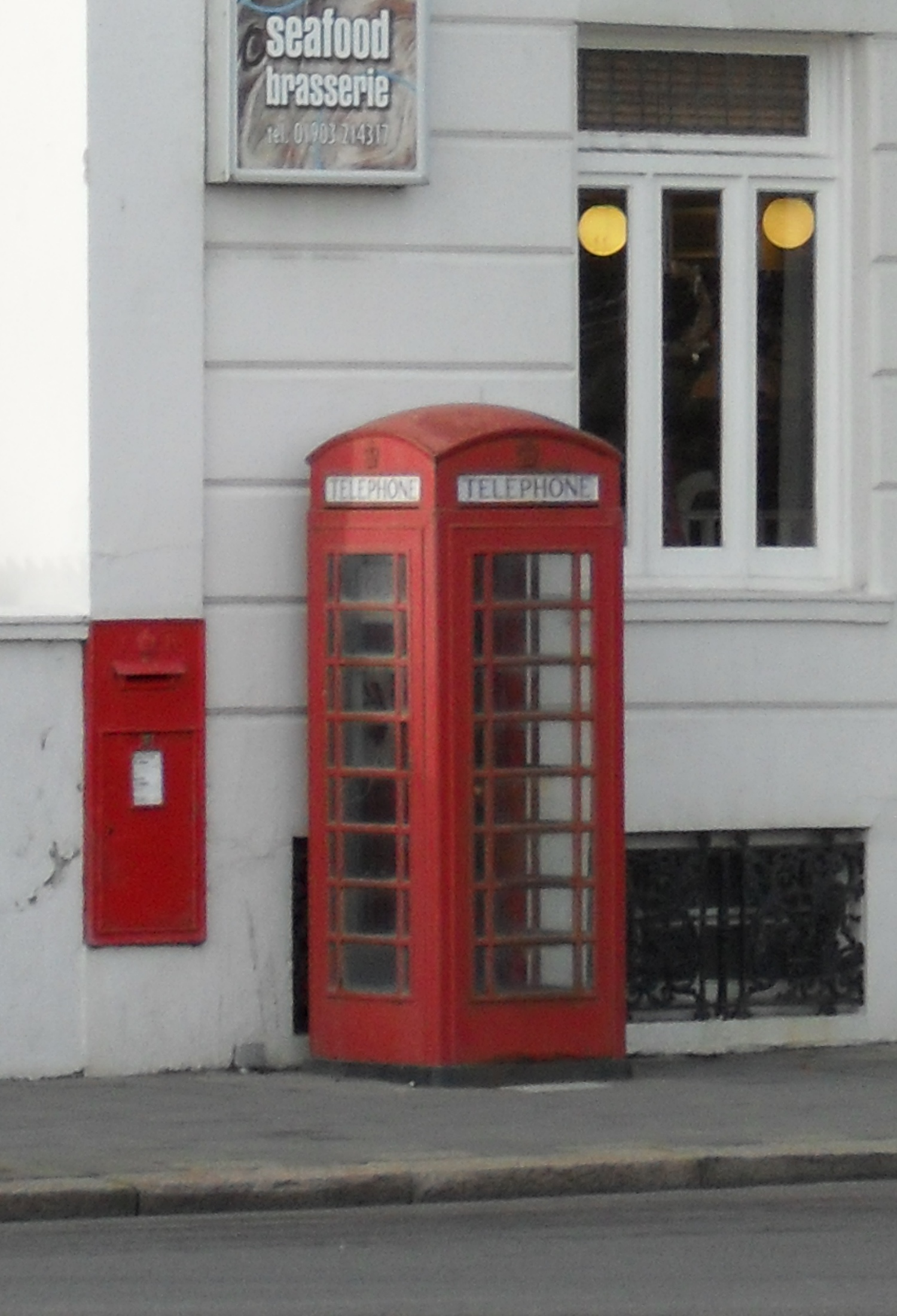
This K6 telephone kiosk stands on the seafront at the corner of The Steyne.

Name	Area and coordinates	Grade	Notes	ID	Other refs
Castle Goring	Near Cote; 50.8399°N 0.4353°W	I	John Rebecca's Palladian south façade and Gothic Revival north face combine with an array of flint, Coade stone, yellow brickwork, purple-hued white stonework, Ionic pilasters, "bizarre" chevron mouldings and internal rib vaulting to produce a little-known but "astonishing" house, latterly used as a language school but now standing empty and suffering decay. It was built for Sir Bysshe Shelley between 1791 and 1825.	302214	
Old Palace	West Tarring; 50.8246°N 0.3932°W	I	This was West Tarring's original manor house, and it has links to past Archbishops of Canterbury (in particular to Thomas Becket). The present building consists of a restored 13th-century hall house with solar and great hall; other parts have been lost. It is a stone and flint structure in the Perpendicular style. The Horsham stone roof is gabled at one end. The palace became a school in the 18th century, and is now the parish hall.	433051	
St Mary's Church	Broadwater; 50.8278°N 0.3733°W	I	Broadwater's parish church has a late Norman appearance, and 19th- and 20th-century remodelling has brought further change, but Saxon origins can still be determined. The flint and stone building is cruciform. The arches in the four-bay nave are considered to be excellent examples.	302233	
1-14 Park Crescent	Worthing; 50.8141°N 0.3785°W	II*	Amon Henry Wilds built this terrace of three-storey Regency-style stuccoed houses in 1829–30. The substantially curved block has ornate details such as anthemion-topped pilasters, Corinthian capitals, entablatures and balconies. Financial problems delayed its completion, and it was less successful than similar developments by Wilds in Brighton.	432845	
6, 8 and 10 High Street (including Beckets Cottage)	West Tarring; 50.8252°N 0.3934°W	II*	The Sussex Archaeological Society own this 15th-century half-timbered row of cottages, historically known as Parsonage Row. Plasterwork and a Horsham stone roof complete the structure, which was originally one building but is now divided into three. The middle section was a folklore museum between 1927 and 1983, but is now a restaurant.	432641	
Beach House	Worthing; 50.8119°N 0.3627°W	II*	John Rebecca built this seafront villa, with stuccoed walls and a bow front, for Robert Carey Elwes in 1820. It was renamed Marino Mansion and rented by the Loder family before being revamped by Maxwell Ayrton for new owner Edward Knoblock. Worthing Borough Council made two attempts to demolish it, but after opposition by the Worthing Civic Society it was sold in 1982 for conversion into flats.	302230	
Christ Church	Worthing; 50.8132°N 0.3737°W	II*	John Elliott's Gothic Revival church of flint, Caen stone and artificial stone was built in 1840–43 and altered in 1894, when a hammerbeam roof was added. A tower dominates the west end. Inside, the reredos and sanctuary floor are in the form of mosaics.	432521	
Desert Quartet sculpture and loggia, Montague Centre	Worthing; 50.8108°N 0.3717°W	II*	Listed in 2007, just 18 years after its creation, this set of male heads was one of sculptor Elisabeth Frink's last works. The bronze heads, each about 5 feet (1.5 m) tall, stand separately on metal pedestals, evenly spaced on a stuccoed loggia which forms part of the same listing. Each face has a slightly different expression. Frink's inspiration was the monumental figures she had seen in the Tunisian desert.		
Dome Cinema	Worthing; 50.8101°N 0.3682°W	II*	Swiss theatre impresario Carl Seebold commissioned Theophilus Allen to build a multi-purpose entertainment complex in the garden of a house he bought in 1909. It opened the following Easter as the Kursaal—a name which was changed during World War I because of its Germanic overtones. A cinema screen was opened on the first floor in October 1911, named The Electric Theatre, and by 1921 the screen had been moved to downstairs and the interior remodeled into what is seen today. The walls are of brick coated with stucco and roughcast. Above the upper storey is a pilastered tower topped with an octagonal dome and a cupola. English Heritage consider it one of the "best five early cinemas" in England.	433343	
Dovecote south of the Old Palace	West Tarring; 50.8244°N 0.3932°W	II*	A dovecote at the Old Palace in West Tarring was first documented in 1313, although one probably existed in the previous century. The present square building is an 18th-century structure of cobbled flint with brick quoins. Its hipped roof of red tiles has a gabled ridge in the centre. The casement window and entrance door have brick surrounds.	433052	
Lodges and Gateway to Park Crescent	Worthing; 50.8136°N 0.3780°W	II*	With caryatids and imposing busts under the main and side archways, this grey stone triumphal arch, flanked by lodges attached by a corniced wall, has been described as "an endearing joke". A trust was formed in 1957 to preserve it; a demolition threat was averted and the trustees spent £2,000 restoring it.	432846	
St Andrew's Church	West Tarring; 50.8247°N 0.3958°W	II*	The oldest parts of this church are 13th-century Early English in style; the tower, with its landmark spire, and chancel are Perpendicular Gothic, and Victorian restoration has changed its appearance. Italian mosaic work inside dates from 1885.	302248	
St Mary's Church	Goring-by-Sea; 50.8130°N 0.4246°W	II*	A Norman church was demolished to make way for Decimus Burton's 1837 rebuild, although some interior fittings (including the 12th-century arcades and their capitals) were incorporated into the new building. The Gothic Revival structure has a grey rendered exterior.	432516	
St Paul's Church	Worthing; 50.8137°N 0.3714°W	II*	John Rebecca used white stucco and yellow brickwork in the construction of Worthing's first Anglican church. The Classical building has enormous Doric columns topped by a pediment, and the roof—described as "hideous" by Nairn, who condemned the overall design of the church—bears a cupola. Structural problems led to its closure in 1995.	302245	
19 Ardsheal Road and garden wall to east	Broadwater; 50.8294°N 0.3770°W	II	This small cottage was built in the 18th century. Its front garden is demarcated by a cobbled flint wall, which is included in the listing. The brickwork of the façade is painted white, and there are two pairs of sash windows. The tiled roof has chimneys at each end.	302210	
Wall on north side on St Mary's churchyard	Broadwater; 50.8280°N 0.3732°W	II	One of two walls around the graveyard of St Mary's Church, this brick and flint structure is believed to date from no later than the 18th century.	302235	
Broadwater Manor House	Broadwater; 50.8269°N 0.3732°W	II	The medieval manor house was substantially rebuilt in the early 19th century and further modified later that century, although some roof timbers and other features survive. It is now a school. The two-storey Georgian-style house has a five-window range and is of pale brick with a roof of slate. The original door survives in a newer entrance porch. A house existed on this site at the time of the Domesday survey.	302232	
Wall to south, east and north of St Mary's churchyard	Broadwater; 50.8276°N 0.3722°W	II	This wall encloses three sides of St Mary's churchyard, and is contemporary with the other separately listed wall. The south- and east-facing parts are much taller than the north-facing section. All are of cobbled flint.	302234	
10 Broadwater Street East	Broadwater; 50.8281°N 0.3737°W	II	This narrow, two-storey building—now a shop—has attic space below its mansard roof, a sash window on the façade of the upper storey and a tiny square window below the roofline. A short chimney rises from one end of the roof. There is a very old wall at the rear.	302243	
19 Broadwater Street East	Broadwater; 50.8281°N 0.3733°W	II	A shopfront was inserted in this 18th-century cottage about a century later, and the exterior stucco and flintwork has been painted over. The upper storey has a single sash window.	302237	
21 Broadwater Street East	Broadwater; 50.8281°N 0.3732°W	II	This cottage is joined to 19 Broadwater Street East on its west side. Whitewash now obscures the 18th-century flintwork of the walls. The upper storey of the street frontage has a three-window range; two windows flank the entrance door below. The roof is of red tiles.	302238	
Ivy Cottage and St Mary's Cottage	Broadwater; 50.8281°N 0.3730°W	II	These two 18th-century red-brick cottages are joined under a single tiled roof. The smaller Ivy Cottage has only one window on each floor; St Mary's Cottage has four on the upper and three on the lower storey, one of which sits below a slate-roofed porch along with the door.	302239	
27 and 27A Broadwater Street East	Broadwater; 50.8281°N 0.3728°W	II	Originally Coate's House and Broadwater House, the early-18th-century building which now forms number 27 was redeveloped in 1818. An extension was built in the 1840s; this later became a separate entity, number 27A. The white-painted brick façade has sash windows; those on the ground floor jut forward under leaded hoods. The steep roof combines slate with tiles.	302240	
Garden wall and gate piers of 27 Broadwater Street East	Broadwater; 50.8280°N 0.3728°W	II	The wall and piers supporting the gate of the former Broadwater House are listed separately from it. The wall is flint and was built in the 18th century; the gate piers are of brick.	302241	
4, 6 and 8 Broadwater Street East	Broadwater; 50.8281°N 0.3738°W	II	The ground floors of these three 19th-century cottages have been converted into a single shop unit. The walls are stucco, although this has been painted over. Number 4 is slightly recessed and has a first-floor sash window. An older flint wall forms the boundary to the rear.	302242	
7, 9, 11 and 13 Broadwater Street East	Broadwater; 50.8282°N 0.3737°W	II	This row of four two-storey cottages faces the church. They share five sash windows on the upper floor. The ground floors now have a range of uses: both residential and commercial, and from different eras. The roofs are slate and tile, and the eaves are wooden. Numbers 7, 11 and 13 are partly tile-hung.	302236	
26, 28 and 28A Broadwater Street West	Broadwater; 50.8289°N 0.3750°W	II	This pair of 18th-century cottages have been converted into three premises which are in mixed commercial and residential use. They are timber-framed but have a rendered exterior. There are two 19th-century sash windows on the upper storey of the façade.	302244	
Gateway and chapels of Broadwater Cemetery and tombs of Richard Jefferies and W.H. Hudson	Broadwater; 50.8278°N 0.3797°W	II	Two of England's foremost nature writers lived in Worthing, and both are buried at Broadwater's parish church. Jefferies' stone and marble tomb dates from 1887; Hudson's was, in a similar style, was built in 1922. The chapels were used by Anglicans and Nonconformists respectively. They are of flint and stone construction.	432955	
Loxwood	Broadwater; 50.8280°N 0.3724°W	II	Originally called Rectory Cottage, this Regency-style pale-brick house dates from 1820. The porch is a much later addition: the wooden structure is topped with an iron balcony, and its columns camr from the demolished Charmandean mansion. The upper storey has a three-window range.	432513	
South Farm Cottages	Broadwater; 50.8252°N 0.3799°W	II	This group of cottages were built in 1720 and now stand perpendicular to the north/south South Farm Road. The walls are of flint with two brick courses. The gable-ended roof has two central chimneys and is tiled with slate.	432956	
Upton Farmhouse	Broadwater; 50.8348°N 0.3587°W	II	On the A27 near Sompting, this has an 18th-century exterior appearance which hides much older work inside. The red- and grey-brick Georgian-style two-storey house has a range of five sash windows which are not quite evenly spaced. The door is set in a wooden porch with a lead roof. The main roof is slate and has small wooden eaves.	433060	
12 Castle Goring Cottages	Near Cote; 50.8396°N 0.4313°W	II	One of several detached cottages in the grounds of Castle Goring, of which three are listed, this narrow building has apparently been extended in a matching style. The roof supports two chimneys. Two bay windows flank the wooden entrance porch.	302211	
13 Castle Goring Cottages	Near Cote; 50.8396°N 0.4319°W	II	Like its smaller neighbour at number 12, this house is 18th-century. Grey and red brick surround the windows and form quoins on an otherwise flint structure. The tiled roof has eaves supported by modillions.	302212	
14 Castle Goring Cottages	Near Cote; 50.8396°N 0.4336°W	II	This cottage is also detached but is built of red brick, relieved by some grey brick lintels. The five windows are all casements; all have three lights except the narrower two-light one above the gabled entrance porch. Inside, some roof timbers can still be seen.	302213	
Walled garden at Castle Goring	Near Cote; 50.8364°N 0.4327°W	II	Castle Goring's garden was laid out in the 19th century and is enclosed by 12-foot (3.7 m) red-brick walls, creating a space of about 300 by 180 feet (91 m × 55 m). Some pebbledashed outbuildings are included in the listing.	463086	
Stanhope Lodge and Stanhope Store	Near Cote; 50.8403°N 0.4424°W	II	These were under the same ownership when they were built in the late 18th or early 19th century: the present store, now separate from the lodge, may have been its stables. The lodge is a two-storey brick building with casement and sash windows, chimneys on the tiled roof, a carriage entrance-style door below an architrave and a recessed extension with a bay window. It is attached to the single-storey flint storehouse.	462219	
Coach and Horses	Near Cote; 50.8399°N 0.4252°W	II	Built in 1741 on the road to Arundel, this inn spent its first 22 years under the sign of the Rose and Crown. It became a coaching inn in about 1785. Alterations in the 19th and 20th centuries have changed its appearance, but it retains its original panelled hood-moulded door, slate-tiled upper storey, tiled roof, brick chimneys and large sash windows.	462001	
Castle Goring Lodge	Near Cote; 50.8399°N 0.4332°W	II	Sir George Brooke-Pechell, Bt. is believed to have built this in about 1830 in the grounds of Castle Goring. The flint and stucco building has a single storey topped by a partly gabled roof of slate and a prominent corner casement window.	297809	
Durrington Manor House	Durrington; 50.8366°N 0.4116°W	II	Built in the north part of the old village on the site of an earlier manor house held by Robert le Sauvage in the 11th century, this cement-clad brick structure dates from the 18th century. The entrance porch has a red-tiled roof, but Horsham stone is used on the main roof.	302252	
Greenstede House	Durrington; 50.8361°N 0.4127°W	II	This flint cottage is dominated by its large slate roof with wooden eaves, and there is an offset brick chimney and a five-window range. Apart from a Gothic-style porch of about 1820, the building dates from about 1600; at that time it was called Hebron.	302254	
Dower House	Durrington; 50.8365°N 0.4119°W	II	This house was converted from barns associated with Durrington Manor House, which is adjacent. The flint and brick structures have tiled roofs, some old dormer windows and original beams, and are of a similar age to the present manor house.	302253	
St Symphorian's Church	Durrington; 50.8364°N 0.4133°W	II	This existed at the time of the Domesday survey and was previously dedicated to Nicholas and, later, to Thomas Becket. Ruined during the Civil War, it was rebuilt in 1914–19 by Lacy W. Ridge and extended in 1939. The flint and stone church is in the Early English style.	302255	
Wall enclosing front garden of St Mary's Farmhouse	Durrington; 50.8316°N 0.4122°W	II	This is about the same age as the farmhouse and surrounds it on three sides. It also extends beyond the rear of the house to the west. Red-brick quoins contrast with the pale flint which forms the main building material.	302257	
St Mary's Farmhouse	Durrington; 50.8317°N 0.4123°W	II	Damaged in an arson attack in 1978 and threatened with demolition as a consequence, this mid-18th-century house was restored instead. The steep thatched roof covers a long, two-storey brick building with casement windows and an off-centre chimney. Timber framing remains inside, and the building's origins may lie in the 14th century as an open hall-house.	302256	
Thatched Cottage, Pond Lane	Durrington; 50.8342°N 0.4133°W	II	Previously named Durringmere, this 18th-century flint and brick cottage stood in the old southern part of Durrington village, near St Mary's farmhouse but away from the church. The hipped thatched roof is topped by a chimney. The flintwork is now painted.	432849	
Barn and outbuildings north and east of Field Place	Durrington; 50.8210°N 0.4076°W	II	The present L-shaped group presents a modern appearance, but the core of these buildings is an 18th-century set of flint barns. The longer side runs north–south and has experienced less restoration; original slit windows are still visible. The east–west section is partly tile-hung.	302226	
Field Place	Durrington; 50.8202°N 0.4087°W	II	Owned by the Borough Council since 1956 and used for social and cultural activities, Field Place has 14th-century origins, and the "Oak Room" retains high-quality Jacobean-style wood panelling dating from 1624. The frontage was erected in the 18th century. The Henty pioneers lived here in the early 19th century.	302224	
Wall to south of barn and outbuildings at Field Place	Durrington; 50.8208°N 0.4083°W	II	Although this wall in the grounds of Field Place has been strengthened with modern brickwork, it is composed mainly of flint and chalk and dates from the 18th century.	302227	
Outbuilding northeast of Field Place	Durrington; 50.8207°N 0.4087°W	II	Also known as the "Pavilion barn", this dates from about 1750. Flintwork, relieved by red-brick dressings, forms the main building material, but weatherboarding and timber framing are also in evidence. The roof is tiled.	302225	
Cottage Farm	Near Durrington; 50.8297°N 0.4350°W	II	This flint cottage has a three-window range on the upper storey and windows flanking the centrally placed entrance door at ground-floor level. The door is set in a porch with a gabled roof. Extensive use is made of brick on the exterior: there are red-brick quoins, window surrounds and decorative courses. The building dates from the 1870s.	433056	
Hightiten Barn	Near Durrington; 50.8274°N 0.4372°W	II	The main barn and its lower, longer perpendicular wings form three sides of a yard. All have slate roofs (either hipped or half-hipped), but the main building is of flint while the others are of timber construction.	433057	
Lamp Standard, Farncombe Road	East Worthing; 50.8141°N 0.3607°W	II	When electricity came to Worthing in 1901, the borough council installed 110 elaborate cast-iron lamp-posts with hexagonal glass and iron lamps suspended from an arm 20 feet (6.1 m) above the ground. The only remaining example—saved by Worthing Civic Society founder Patricia Baring, outside whose home it stood—is on a floral-planted traffic island.	433346	
Old Mill Cottage	East Worthing; 50.8140°N 0.3517°W	II	Although it is now a single entity, this building was a pair of cottages when it was erected in the 1720s. Cobblestone walls (now whitewashed) with brick quoins sit below a pointed slate roof. Some old doorways have become windows.	432599	
Side walls to rear garden of Old Mill Cottage	East Worthing; 50.8140°N 0.3519°W	II	These walls are identical to those of the cottage—white-painted cobblestones with brick quoining—and are the same age as it.	432600	
St George's Church	East Worthing; 50.8142°N 0.3573°W	C	George Truefitt designed East Worthing's parish church in the 1860s; it opened in 1868. He used Bargate stone for his Decorated Gothic-style building, which has a prominent apse, spirelets and an incomplete corner tower.	432951	
1-3 Selden Lane	East Worthing; 50.8139°N 0.3585°W	II	This small terrace appears to have been two cottages when built in the early 19th centurym, but three houses now occupy it. The walls are of large flints dressed and quoined with red brick, which also frames the sash windows. The roof is of slate and has three chimneys.	432952	
Front garden wall of 1-3 Selden Lane	East Worthing; 50.8140°N 0.3584°W	II	The low flint front garden wall of the three cottages is listed separately. It was probably built at the same time and runs parallel to Selden Lane.	432953	
Goar Cottages	Findon Valley; 50.8565°N 0.4023°W	II	This pair of semi-detached cottages have stood on their prominent corner site since the 18th century. The main building material is flint, but bands and quoins of red brickwork are prominent. The roof is of tile and slopes steeply, especially to the rear where it covers a later extension.	432512	
Old Court House	Goring-by-Sea; 50.8124°N 0.4140°W	II	The present mid-19th-century appearance obscures some older work, including an external staircase and stone walls. The entrance porch projects from the centre of the façade, is carried up to the slate roofline and is topped by a gable. A smaller 18th-century section stands at the rear.	432517	
Thatched Cottage, Goring Road	Goring-by-Sea; 50.8122°N 0.4192°W	II	This 16th-century cottage's name no longer reflects its roofing material: the deep roof has been retiled. Original timber-framing, infilled with plasterwork and brick, remains.	432515	
Bull Inn	Goring-by-Sea; 50.8132°N 0.4324°W	II	This public house has two sections, both of which appear 18th-century from the outside. This remodelling hides older timber-framing inside. The main range has a tiled roof with chimneys above the gables, a brick and flint façade and sash windows. The extension has a lower roofline with similar features.	432518	
Jupps Barn	Goring-by-Sea; 50.8158°N 0.4274°W	II	This is now the church hall of the adjacent Roman Catholic Church of the English Martyrs, and functioned as the church before that. The flint and red-brick five-bay barn dates from the 18th century. Many original beams and timbers remain inside the main barn and the attached outbuilding.	433341	
The Cottage	Goring-by-Sea; 50.8163°N 0.4303°W	II	Painted stucco hides the flint and brick walls of this early-19th-century detached cottage, which has a thatched roof with chimneys at the gable ends. All windows are casements. A tile-roofed porch projects from the centre of the ground floor.	432519	
Goring Hall	Goring-by-Sea; 50.8112°N 0.4316°W	II	Charles Barry built the first house on this site in about 1840. It was gutted by fire, demolished and replaced in 1889 by a replica, whose tower was knocked down in 1941. The red-brick building has large sash windows on all sides and retains its Jacobean dining hall, although some other internal features have been lost since its conversion from a school to a private hospital.	433310	
Wall north of Goring Hall	Goring-by-Sea; 50.8119°N 0.4318°W	II	This wall completely encloses a former orchard in the grounds of the hall. Two walls are entirely of brick, while the other two also incorporate flintwork.	432660	
Former stables of Goring Hall	Goring-by-Sea; 50.8115°N 0.4317°W	II	This U-shaped block, dating from about 1830, surrounds a courtyard and has slate roofs and brick-dressed cobblestone walls. The main building has two storeys, a glazed central archway flanked by semicircular and square windows, and a pediment. The single-storey attached wings have pedimented gable-ends.	432659	
Sea Court	Goring-by-Sea; 50.8110°N 0.4232°W	II	The former vicarage of St Mary's Church has seen many changes since it was built in the 18th century. It incorporates older structural work, in particular in a single-storey projection on the east side and on the ground floor of the main house. The latter has two storeys of cobblestones topped with a slate roof. There are chimneys on the gables.	432797	
Jefferies House	Goring-by-Sea; 50.8111°N 0.4225°W	II	Author Richard Jefferies lived here for about a year until his death in 1887. The house, which was built earlier that decade, was renamed in his honour: it was originally Sea View. Botanist William Hudson was a resident later as well. The brick-dressed flint building has bay and casement windows, a decoratively panelled door and two narrow chimneys.	432798	
North Barn (range of outbuildings on east side of yard)	Goring-by-Sea; 50.8226°N 0.4358°W	II	These buildings are much lower and longer than the adjacent main L-shaped range, and enclose the rest of the yard at this farm next to the A27. The walls are of flint.	432802	
North Barn (main block) including wall across the south	Goring-by-Sea; 50.8225°N 0.4362°W	II	An early-19th-century barn with nearby outbuildings of the same age (separately listed), this cobbled flint and red-brick structure has a roof of slate covering queen post timbers. One face is partly weatherboarded.	432801	
Courtlands Hospital	Goring-by-Sea; 50.8113°N 0.4130°W	II	The first house on this site was built in the Regency style in 1820, but its character changed completely in 1903 when a new owner transformed it into a sprawling mansion using unwanted materials rescued from buildings such as the Hôtel Ritz Paris. It was requisitioned during World War II, became a hospital in 1945 and was used for healthcare administration until 1996.	432848	
Sundial at Courtlands House	Goring-by-Sea; 50.8113°N 0.4125°W	II	This freestanding stone structure in the formal gardens at Courtlands imitates 18th-century sculpture, but dates from the time of the major renovations in the early 20th century. All four faces of the cube-shaped upper section have gnomons and dials.	468665	
Gazebo at Courtlands House	Goring-by-Sea; 50.8111°N 0.4125°W	II	This structure, contemporary with the separately listed terrace, stands at one end of it. Stone quoins, grey rendered walls and a slate-tiled roof are visible, although the building is in fact of brick. An entrance in the west wall has a semicircular fanlight.	471779	
Archway to formal garden at Courtlands House	Goring-by-Sea; 50.8112°N 0.4127°W	II	A stone arch of Classical design leads to Courtlands' formal gardens, which have been encroached upon by postwar housing development. The lintel between the flanking pillars is topped with two stone balls.	471780	
Balustraded terrace to the rear of Courtlands House	Goring-by-Sea; 50.8111°N 0.4128°W	II	Built at the same time as the house was remodelled and the other garden ornamentation was added, this stone terrace runs along one side of the formal gardens and ends at the separately listed gazebo. A row of yellow brickwork lies between the stone base and the balusters. Two sets of steps lead down to the garden.	471781	
Burlington Hotel	Heene; 50.8081°N 0.3821°W	II	This forms the south end of Heene Terrace at the west end of Worthing seafront. G.A. Dean designed and built the three-storey Italianate hotel in 1865. The south façade was remodelled in 1911. The west face has a cast-iron balcony.	433269	
Heene Terrace	Heene; 50.8082°N 0.3834°W	II	Two seaside terraces separated by a garden formed the central part of the "new town" of West Worthing, planned in the mid-19th century. The three-storey brown brick and stucco houses have mansard roofs, dormer windows, ornate balconies and canopies. An entablature supported by pilasters flanking each entrance door spans each terrace. G.A. Dean's design was executed in 1865.	432601	
St Botolph's Church	Heene; 50.8139°N 0.3865°W	C	Brighton-based architect Edmund Scott was commissioned to design a replacement for the ancient Heene Chapel—dedicated to Saint Botolph and derelict by the 17th century. It was intended to serve the new residential development at West Worthing. The Early English-style building in flint and brick opened in 1873; the spire-topped tower was added six years later.	432799	
Ruined portion of former St Botolph's Church	Heene; 50.8137°N 0.3863°W	II	A tiny portion of the original (13th/14th-century) St Botolph's Church lies to the east of the new building. It is believed to be part of the old east wall. Most of the rubble was cleared by the late 18th century.	432800	
High Salvington Windmill	High Salvington; 50.8486°N 0.4065°W	II	This post mill has been restored to working order after a period when its roundhouse served as a tearoom. It was sold to the borough council in 1956. When it was built in about 1700, it was referred to as Salvington or Durrington Mill; the High Salvington estate developed only in the 20th century.	432514	
Offington Hall Riding School	Offington; 50.8345°N 0.3893°W	II	The mid-19th-century Offington Hall, on the site of the ancient Offington manor, was demolished in 1963, but the old stables remained. The long, low flint building has been converted into a horseriding school. A tall passageway with an arched entrance leads to a courtyard formed by two perpendicular wings at the rear. The main range has a prominent clock tower with a weather-vane.	432597	
Old Brewhouse	Offington; 50.8350°N 0.3905°W	II	This timber-framed former outbuilding, now a brewery, predates the demolished Offington Hall and is the only survivor of the estate apart from the former stables. Small, haphazardly placed casement windows punctuate the façade. A substantial chimney dominates the tiled roof.	432598	
Old Cottage	Salvington; 50.8343°N 0.3978°W	II	This late-18th-century flint cottage has been extended in matching materials at the east end. It retains its original casement windows on the first floor; the sash windows below are 19th-century replacements. There are chimneys at each end of the slate-covered roof.	302217	
Walnut Tree Cottage	Salvington; 50.8340°N 0.3971°W	II	Walnut Tree Cottage, a mostly flint building with some brickwork and a steep roof covered with red tiles, was built in 1762. Its eaves are supported by modillions.	302216	
Old House	Salvington; 50.8344°N 0.3970°W	II	Renovated in 1911, this 15th-century timber-framed open hall-house was also remodelled in the 17th century, when a parlour and chimney were added. The roof retains some original stone slabs quarried in Horsham. The parlour section is partly tile-hung, while flintwork and plaster covers the timber frame of the rest of the building.	302215	
Half Moon House	Salvington; 50.8363°N 0.3990°W	II	This two-storey, mid-19th-century cottage has a main range of three windows and a newer northern section with a slightly projecting façade and a further window. The entrance is flanked by Doric pilasters.	432522	
Salvington Nurseries	Salvington; 50.8377°N 0.3989°W	II	This is a plain grey- and red-brick cottage dating from the 18th century. The tiled roof is in the mansard style. The projecting central porch is a 19th-century addition.	432523	
Salvington Letts	Salvington; 50.8353°N 0.4000°W	II	Also known as Old Sussex Cottage, this is one of a few buildings in the Worthing area to use knapped flint. The main range, with four windows on each storey, is 17th-century, but another wing was added later.	432946	
Outbuilding northwest of Salvington Letts	Salvington; 50.8355°N 0.4002°W	II	This hipped-roofed flint structure behind Salvington Letts is probably not contemporary with the cottage: it is estimated to be 18th-century. The single-storey building has some brickwork, and the roof has pantiles.	432948	
Barn west of Salvington Letts	Salvington; 50.8353°N 0.4004°W	II	Also known as Lambley's Barn, this was built in about 1800 to the west of Salvington Letts cottage. Like the adjoining outbuilding to the north, it is mostly of flint with some brickwork, but the roof is of slate.	432949	
Rose Cottage	Salvington; 50.8359°N 0.4119°W	II	The building began as an iron forge in the early 18th century; a date of 1723 has been attributed. The locally prominent Overington family owned it, and the initial "O" can be seen on a stone in the extension of 1808, which added an extra two-storey bay to one side. Most of the building is of knapped flint except for a further bay on the opposite side, added later and coated with render.	433313	
Boundary wall of the premises of Messrs Overington	Salvington; 50.8359°N 0.4121°W	II	This wall is contemporary with Rose Cottage and runs along the rear as far as the adjacent road (Durrington Hall), forming a yard area. It is mostly of flint.	432945	
Front garden wall and piers of Salvington Letts	Salvington; 50.8352°N 0.4000°W	II	The main part of this wall, which encloses three sides of the garden at Salvington Letts cottage, faces Salvington Road. The main material is flint, capped with stone and including some brickwork on the gate piers.	432947	
Outbuilding west of Salvington Letts	Salvington; 50.8352°N 0.4004°W	II	Facing the barn in the grounds of Salvington Letts and backing on to Salvington Road, this long, single-storey structure dates from about 1800 and is of the same materials as the barn. All of the cottage's associated buildings are listed because of their group architectural value.	432950	
St Andrew's Churchyard wall, table tomb of John Parson and 18th-century gravestones	West Tarring; 50.8249°N 0.3960°W	II	The stone table-tomb dates from 1633, and the other structures are 18th-century. The wall encloses one side of the churchyard and is of flint.	302249	
54, 56 and 58 Church Road	West Tarring; 50.8247°N 0.3942°W	II	Considered a good example of the use of cobbled flints in the Worthing area, this three-cottage terrace was built in the early 19th century in the centre of West Tarring village. Each cottage has a single sash window on each floor. The brick quoins on the walls have been painted white.	302247	
George and Dragon	West Tarring; 50.8250°N 0.3939°W	II	This inn has 15th-century origins and originally operated under the sign of the White Horse. The present building is 18th-century, although the red-tiled roof replaces one of stone which existed in 1868. The building is of brick which is painted or rendered in parts. The façade has sash windows.	432651	
11 and 13 High Street	West Tarring; 50.8253°N 0.3935°W	II	These two-storey cottages date from the 19th century; one was used as a shop at that time before it became residential. There are chimneys at each gable end of the slate-tiled roof. The upper storey has three sash windows.	432654	
12 and 14 High Street and garden wall to south	West Tarring; 50.8252°N 0.3934°W	II	Cobbled flints with some brick dressings are used on this pair of early-19th-century cottages. There are two sash windows on each floor. The brick and flint wall encloses the adjacent garden and runs parallel to the road.	432642	
Chippers	West Tarring; 50.8254°N 0.3935°W	II	The name refers to a large local family who occupied several houses in the village in the 18th and 19th centuries. This cottage, set back from the street and at right-angles to its neighbours, is an 18th-century flint structure with a tiled roof which has been partly converted from sloping to flat.	432655	
15 and 17 High Street	West Tarring; 50.8255°N 0.3934°W	II	These adjoining cottages show evidence of 19th-century modifications to their older structure. The rear walls are of flint and brick respectively, but the street-facing walls are rendered. Number 17 has three windows and a door, while number 15's door is between the two ground-floor windows.	432656	
Providence Cottage	West Tarring; 50.8254°N 0.3934°W	II	This 18th-century red-brick cottage has an off-centre recessed entrance below a bricked-up window, two extant windows on each floor and a single chimney.	432643	
19 High Street	West Tarring; 50.8255°N 0.3933°W	II	Part of the ground floor of this 19th-century cottage used to be a shop. The partly glazed entrance door sits below an entablature which is carried across the façade above the ground-floor window. The walls are of grey and red brick, and the roof is slate.	432657	
2 and 4 High Street	West Tarring; 50.8249°N 0.3937°W	II	This was originally three cottages; one is now the village post office. The timber-framed building may date from the 17th century and has exterior tile-hanging, jettying and painted brickwork. The roof supports two prominent chimneys.	432607	
20, 22 and 24 High Street	West Tarring; 50.8254°N 0.3931°W	II	This terrace of three cottages shares a five-window range; the northernmost building has one on each floor, the others two. The middle cottage was built as a shop unit. The brick buildings date from the early 19th century.	432644	
Old Castle	West Tarring; 50.8254°N 0.3930°W	II	This semi-detached cottage was built in the 18th century and had a roof of Horsham stone, which has now been replaced with slates. The upper storey has three casement windows; two sashes flank the entrance door below. The façade is stuccoed.	432645	
28 and 30 High Street	West Tarring; 50.8255°N 0.3928°W	II	These cottages built as a single house in the 16th century. The tiled roof is carried down to just above ground level at the side of number 28. The timber-framed structure hides behind stucco, flint and brickwork. Both cottages have one window to each floor; all but one are modern casements. Number 28 retains old beams and an original fireplace.	432646	
Malthouse Cottage and 5 High Street	West Tarring; 50.8252°N 0.3938°W	II	This pair of cottages share a roofline but are of different materials: Malthouse Cottage is mostly cement-faced with some exposed flint cobblestones at first-floor level, while number 5 is mostly flint relieved by red brick in places. The roof is partly tiled and covered with Horsham slates elsewhere.	432652	
32 High Street	West Tarring; 50.8257°N 0.3928°W	II	This 18th-century semi-detached cottage has two chimneys on the tiled roof of its main (street-fronting) range. Two projecting wings extend to the rear. There are five sash windows in the rendered façade.	432648	
38 and 40 High Street	West Tarring; 50.8258°N 0.3924°W	II	Built in the 16th century as a single house, this building has been significantly altered and converted into two cottages, but some timber-framing and a king post roof survive. The walls are mostly of flint and brick; number 40, which is perpendicular to the street, has some rendering. Both parts have an off-centre chimney stack.	432649	
The Hollies, High Street	West Tarring; 50.8260°N 0.3924°W	II	The core of the present building predates a 1774 reconstruction. A three-window upper-storey range sits below a prominent cornice and eaves. The house is built of flint cobbles and has a small building in its rear grounds.	432650	
Banner House and Banner Cottage	West Tarring; 50.8253°N 0.3936°W	II	A stuccoed façade was applied to this pair of cottages in the 18th century, obscuring its original timber-framing. The building, which has a hipped slate roof, dates from the 17th century. An extension at the rear is a century newer.	432653	
Market House	West Tarring; 50.8186°N 0.3916°W	II	Occupied by three ground-floor shop units since the 19th century, this grey- and red-brick 18th-century building stands on a corner site in the centre of the village. There are four sash windows at first-floor level below a modern slate-covered roof.	302246	
Bishop's Garth	West Tarring; 50.8241°N 0.3933°W	II	The age of this flint cottage is uncertain, but the 18th century is the most likely construction date. The tiled roof, which has a cornice and modillions, bears chimneys at both gable ends.	433050	
The Pendules	West Tarring; 50.8229°N 0.3932°W	II	The stuccoed façade of this 19th-century detached cottage has a projecting central porch with a partly glazed entrance door. The slate roof ends in a cornice.	433053	
Folly to the rear of 100 South Street	West Tarring; 50.8211°N 0.3916°W	II	A solicitor who lived in this house in the 19th century built a square castellated retreat in his garden. It assumed its present form in about 1896, but was started earlier and was probably built in several stages: there are several shades of brickwork between the flint cobblestones. The upper windows have pointed arches.	433344	
92 South Street and front garden wall	West Tarring; 50.8209°N 0.3922°W	II	This cottage is in the middle of an early-19th-century terrace. The original porch was replaced with a Georgian Revival doorcase with a small pediment. The sash windows are dressed with red brick, but the rest of the building is flint. The wall is of flint cobbles with stone coping.	432958	
94 and 96 South Street and front garden wall	West Tarring; 50.8210°N 0.3922°W	II	Part of the same terrace as number 92 and contemporary with it, these paired cottages have been knocked through to form a single house. The three windows are not evenly spaced on the façade, and the door is also offset. The corniced roof is of slate.	432959	
Black Nest Hall	West Worthing; 50.8081°N 0.3919°W	II	In 1926, two architects moved a timber-framed barn from Dunsfold in Surrey to West Worthing, reassembled it, converted it into a Tudor Revival house and named it Black Nest (or Blacknest) Hall. It was originally built in 1728. Brickwork, tile-hung gables and lead band-coursing are visible on the exterior, and there is a queen post roof inside.	475370	
Smuggler's Farm	West Worthing; 50.8078°N 0.4080°W	II	The main part of this house is an old (possibly 16th-century) timber-framed cottage, on the site of a manor first described in 1321. Former Bishop of Chichester Robert Sherborne bought it in 1512. Plasterwork now covers the old timbers, and a flint extension was built at the rear in the 18th century. The roof retains some old Horsham stones.	432954	
21 and 23 Alfred Place	Worthing; 50.8116°N 0.3650°W	II	These 19th-century stuccoed terraced three-storey houses have boat porches—a type of ogee-arched rendered porch found only in Worthing, where several original examples remain. Each house has one window per floor: original sashes in number 23 and later casements in number 21. The roof is of slate.	302204	
25 and 27 Alfred Place	Worthing; 50.8117°N 0.3649°W	II	Part of the same terrace as numbers 21 and 23 but much shorter, these have sash windows, adjoining dormers in the attic space and boat porches.	302205	
1-14 Ambrose Place and sections of railing along the front	Worthing; 50.8136°N 0.3723°W	II	Ambrose Cartwright, one of the promoters of this early speculative residential development, gave his name to these elegant three-storey stuccoed terraced houses. Started in about 1810 at the height of the Regency period, it took more than 10 years to complete and originally faced a central grassed area which was built on about 50 years later. A wooden balcony spans the whole terrace at first-floor level.	302206	
15 Ambrose Place	Worthing; 50.8135°N 0.3729°W	II	This end-of-terrace house is listed separately because of its later date (about 1850) and slightly different style. Its main features—stuccoed façade, three storeys and sash windows—complement the rest of the terrace, however. The door sits in a porch topped by a decorative entablature.	302207	
12 and 14 Ann Street	Worthing; 50.8121°N 0.3685°W	II	Charles Hide built these small Classical-style cottages in 1839. A large semicircular fanlight which spanned the doorways of the original cottages was removed when the building was converted into a single commercial building. As at Hide's contemporary chapel in Bedford Row, the windows taper slightly towards the top.	302209	
8 Ann Street	Worthing; 50.8121°N 0.3686°W	II	Showing an uncommon use of blue-grey brick in Worthing, this mid-terrace three-storey cottage was built in the early 19th century. There is one window on each floor and a narrow, deeply recessed arched doorway edged in red brick to the left.	302208	
4 Bath Place	Worthing; 50.8099°N 0.3706°W	II	This three-storey 19th-century building forms a group with the adjacent properties at numbers 5 to 8. The ground floor has been converted into a shop, but the two floors above have bay windows and blocked flat window-frames. In front of the lower bay window is an ornate iron balcony. The walls are stuccoed.	302218	
5 Bath Place	Worthing; 50.8100°N 0.3706°W	II	Another three-storey early-19th-century stuccoed house with a recent shop conversion on the ground floor, this differs from its neighbour at number 4 by having wide bow-fronted windows at first- and second-floor levels. There is a dormer window in the attic space.	302219	
6, 7 and 8 Bath Place	Worthing; 50.8101°N 0.3706°W	II	Unlike their neighbours, these three early-19th-century buildings are listed together as a group. Numbers 6 and 8 have the same bay-window style as number 4 at first- and second-floor level, and number 7's curved windows match those of number 5. Most of the windows were replaced later in the 19th century. Shops have been inserted in the ground floor in all cases.	302220	
Bedford Hall	Worthing; 50.8119°N 0.3732°W	II	Charles Hide's commission for a new chapel for Worthing's Wesleyan Methodists was executed in 1839–40. The Neoclassical design has distinctive tapering windows in the Egyptian style. The middle window is shorter than the others to accommodate the entrance door. Its religious function ceased in 1900, and is now part of the Vintners Parrot pub.	302223	
3-6 Bedford Row	Worthing; 50.8105°N 0.3688°W	II	One of the town's earliest residential developments, this Regency terrace was built in 1803. The houses are bow-fronted, built of yellow brick and have impressive doorways with fanlights. Each house has four storeys topped by a cornice.	302221	
8-14 Bedford Row	Worthing; 50.8109°N 0.3688°W	II	These are contemporary with and similar to the other houses in Bedford Row, but small differences appear: most have full basements, numbers 13 and 14 have attic space with dormer windows, numbers 8 to 11 have pediments over their doorways (supported on Doric columns), and the façades are stuccoed.	302222	
Ace House	Worthing; 50.8192°N 0.3734°W	II	Formerly Broadwater Lodge and Bridge House, this villa was built in 1832—possibly by John Rebecca or Henry Cotton—and still stands despite its purchase by the county council in 1961 when Broadwater Road was being widened.	302228	
205, 207, 209 and 211 Brighton Road	Worthing; 50.8132°N 0.3525°W	II	Stanley Adshead's first building in Worthing was the never-completed Albion Terrace, which no longer bears that name. It is a Regency-style pastiche dating from 1904, with three floors, mansard roofs to the westernmost houses and a pediment and cornice to numbers 209 and 211. This should have been a central feature, but two more houses intended for the east end were not built.	302231	
22 and 24 Brighton Road	Worthing; 50.8119°N 0.3654°W	II	Modern shop units obscure these two houses, which were built on the south side of the Brighton Road in the 1830s. Two sash windows flank a blank window space of the same size. The pilasters at each end of the façade originally reached ground level, but now terminate above the shopfronts.	302229	
War Memorial, St Paul's Church	Worthing; 50.8139°N 0.3713°W	II	This sandstone war memorial commemorates 96 World War I victims who lived in the parish of St Paul's Church. Names of World War II victims were added later. It was erected in about 1920 and was moved to its present location outside the northern annexe of the church in 1963 or 1964. Grade II listed status was granted in January 2018.	1452981	
Worthing Town Hall, Assembly Hall and Worthing Room	Worthing; 50.8147°N 0.3722°W	II	Charles Cowles-Voysey designed this complex in 1933–35. The brick Neo-Georgian building has a slate roof with stone bands below it. All windows are sashes. Ionic columns support a central stone portico bearing the town's motto, above which is a clock tower with a green cupola. Marble is used extensively inside.	433265	
Worthing Tabernacle	Worthing; 50.8142°N 0.3719°W	II	A rose window dominates the façade of James Lund's 1908 Gothic and Romanesque Revival chapel, of yellow stone and dark brick. The interior is richly decorated.	433337	
Our Lady of Sion Convent	Worthing; 50.8131°N 0.3771°W	II	Henry Clutton planned a much larger building for the prominent corner site of the convent, part of which opened in 1864 at the same time as the adjacent St Mary of the Angels church. Built of dark red brick with courses of darker brickwork, it complements the church. The tiled roof has brick eaves.	302250	
Wall of Our Lady of Sion Convent	Worthing; 50.8125°N 0.3767°W	II	This cobbled flint wall, facing the adjacent Crescent Road, is almost certainly older than the convent itself. It starts at the building's southeast corner and runs southwards parallel to the road.	302251	
Elizabeth Almshouses	Worthing; 50.8143°N 0.3774°W	II	Alfred Burges funded these almshouses for the benefit of elderly single women, and his son William Burges designed them in a Tudor Revival style in 1859. The four houses are built as two pairs, sharing three tall chimneys and a six-window range. A statue of Saint Elizabeth stands centrally below the roofline.	361810	
Wall along east side of Field Row	Worthing; 50.8117°N 0.3725°W	II	Field Row is a narrow path connecting Shelley Road to Ambrose Place: a twitten in the Sussex dialect. This 18th-century wall, mostly of cobbled flint but with some brickwork, forms its eastern boundary.	361811	
Bentworth Lodge	Worthing; 50.8130°N 0.3743°W	II	This detached villa with stuccoed walls and a slate roof was built in the 1840s. The eaves of the hipped roof are prominent on all sides. There are sash windows on all sides; those at the front are hood-moulded in a simple fashion.	432520	
40 and 40A High Street	Worthing; 50.8135°N 0.3678°W	II	Most of the old cottages on Worthing High Street were cleared in postwar redevelopment, but this early-19th-century example survives. A shop unit occupies the ground floor, above which are bow-fronted windows. The walls and quoins are stuccoed.	432602	
42 High Street	Worthing; 50.8135°N 0.3679°W	II	This is attached to the north side of numbers 40 and 40A High Street. It is slightly later in date, has a flat roof and is also three storeys tall. A bow-fronted sash window at ground floor level sits below single casements at the first- and second-floor levels.	432603	
44 High Street	Worthing; 50.8136°N 0.3679°W	II	Although this forms an architectural group with its High Street neighbours, this three-storey cottage is older (no later than 1800), built of painted cobblestones and recessed from the street. The quoins and window surrounds are white. A blank window sits below the tiled roof.	432604	
Swan Inn	Worthing; 50.8154°N 0.3689°W	II	Built in the 1790s as a private house, this three-storey brick and stucco building became an inn in 1849. There is a two-part slate roof with a single gable-end chimney. The front and rear faces have sash windows. In about 1938, a flat-roofed single-storey brick extension was built fronting the street.	432605	
7 and 8 Humphrys Almshouses	Worthing; 50.8129°N 0.3733°W	II	Six almshouses commemorating the founding Humphreys family were built in 1858, and a detached pair were added in 1867. Only the latter survive in their original form: numbers 1 to 6 were demolished in 1970 and rebuilt in a modern style. Numbers 7 and 8 are semi-detached Tudor Revival flint buildings with stone dressings. There is a steeply gabled central porch.	432658	
The Hollies, Little High Street	Worthing; 50.8157°N 0.3686°W	II	Local yellow bricks were used to build this villa in about 1810. The three sash windows are set in elegant round-headed arcades, and the slate roof is hipped. The building has had several non-residential uses, most recently as a charity office.	432803	
1-12 Liverpool Terrace	Worthing; 50.8112°N 0.3724°W	II	Henry Cotton's speculatively developed terrace of about 1828 is one of Worthing's most important residential buildings. Its curved façade is accentuated by the bowed fronts to each house, framed by iron balconies on the second of four storeys (except on number 10, which has large Doric columns supporting a balustraded stone balcony). The houses are topped by parapets.	432804	
Worthing Lido	Worthing; 50.8090°N 0.3728°W	II	A "witty and attractive" structure which was originally used for musical performances on the promenade, Stanley Adshead's 1925–26 metal-roofed rendered and plastered building was converted into a lido in 1958. Local building company Frank Sandell & Sons Ltd executed Adshead's design, which involved a U-shaped projection from towards the sea from street level.	433271	
Worthing Pier	Worthing; 50.8088°N 0.3695°W	II	Built in 1861–62 to a length of 960 feet (290 m) and a width of 18 feet (5.5 m) by Robert Rawlinson—provider of the town's first regular water supply a decade earlier—the pier was rebuilt by James Mansergh in 1889 and had its landward pavilion added in 1925 by Stanley Adshead. The contemporary seaward pavilion burnt down in 1933 (a replacement was immediately built), and the structure had previously been wrecked by storms at Easter 1913.	432812	
74 Marine Parade	Worthing; 50.8092°N 0.3749°W	II	This 19th-century terraced house rises to four storeys, each of which has two windows in the bowed façade. At the top is attic space and a parapet in front of a mansard roof. A partly covered wooden balcony encloses the first floor.	432808	
75 and 76 Marine Parade	Worthing; 50.8091°N 0.3752°W	II	These are attached to and contemporary with number 74. Number 76, on a corner site, has the same bowed front, roofed wooden balcony and parapet as number 74; they form a pair flanking the recessed, flat-fronted number 75. Both buildings have two sash windows on each floor.	432809	
77-79 Marine Parade	Worthing; 50.8091°N 0.3755°W	II	This terrace of three four-storey houses is the same age as 74–76 Marine Parade, but their design is different. Number 77 has a two-window range to each floor, but numbers 78 and 79 have three windows each and are taller. The former wooden balcony at first-floor level has been removed.	432810	
83 Marine Parade and railings	Worthing; 50.8085°N 0.3792°W	II	This flat-roofed building, contemporary with those further along Marine Parade, stands at the corner of West Buildings. It rises to three storeys, the highest of which has a central blank window in the sea-facing frontage. In the centre of this face is a round-arched doorway. A two-window range with first-floor balcony faces east.	432811	
Bedford Cottage	Worthing; 50.8103°N 0.3690°W	II	This small flint rubble cottage dates from the early 19th century but has been remodelled. The slate roof has prominent eaves, attic space and one dormer window. Yellow brick is used for the quoins.	433342	
10 Montague Place	Worthing; 50.8097°N 0.3720°W	II	Started in 1802 when this street was developed, this narrow four-storey house has seen much remodelling and now has a shop in the ground floor. The single windows on each floor are slightly bowed, as is the cornice of the roof. The entrance is through an off-centre arched doorway.	432813	
11-14 Montague Place	Worthing; 50.8098°N 0.3721°W	II	Part of the same terrace as number 10, these were built at the same time and to the same height. They all have bowed façades with sash windows, but other details are different: extra windows above the doors, attics with or without dormers and different styles of balconies, for example. Number 12 is the only house in its original form: the others have had shopfronts inserted.	432814	
103 Montague Street (formerly Victoria Inn)	Worthing; 50.8100°N 0.3746°W	II	This is now a shop on the town's main shopping street, but it has its origins in the 17th century and was an inn for many years. The interior has some evidence of timber framing. A gable with a casement window rises on one side of the north (street-fronting) façade. The other windows are sashes.	432843	
22 Montague Street	Worthing; 50.8105°N 0.3712°W	II	John Rebecca built this imposing Classical-style house in 1826. Its four Ionic-style pilasters remain, although at ground-floor level they are hidden behind a shop unit. Each is topped with an ornate capital. A tiled roof rises above a prominent parapet.	432815	
Former Buckingham Arms	Worthing; 50.8102°N 0.3748°W	II	Another former inn on Montague Street—again converted into a shop—this was built in about 1800 but retains little from that time. The two-storey building has attic space with four casement windows above the sash-windowed first floor. The roof is an uneven M-shape.	432816	
43 North Street	Worthing; 50.8150°N 0.3701°W	II	This detached house dates from no later than 1800. Its mostly tiled mansard roof supports chimneys at each end. The façade has been extensively remodelled, but there are flint walls at the rear.	432844	
Beechwood Hall	Worthing; 50.8138°N 0.3800°W	II	Originally two cottages (the North and South Swiss Cottages) in the grounds of Park Crescent, this highly ornamented pebbledashed two-storey house took some inspiration from Brighton's Royal Pavilion. Amon Henry Wilds built it in 1829. It has been a hotel since 1933.	432847	
Former Christ Church School	Worthing; 50.8125°N 0.3734°W	II	Built by Charles Hide in 1861 as a girls' infant school, this knapped flint Gothic building cost £3,500. It has been in commercial use since 1944. Above the steeply pointed entrance porch is a short tower-like projection. The lancet-style casement windows have stone surrounds.	432856	
116 Portland Road	Worthing; 50.8131°N 0.3730°W	II	This cottage is attached to number 118 and was built in the early 19th century; an extension was added later that century. The façade is stuccoed, the roof has red tiles, and there are original sash windows.	432858	
118 Portland Road	Worthing; 50.8132°N 0.3730°W	II	The larger neighbour to number 116 has some later extensions. There are large sash windows and a single casement in the original part of the building, which dates from about 1800. A flint wall with some brickwork remains on the north side, but the rest of the building is covered with ashlar and stucco.	432859	
75 Portland Road	Worthing; 50.8118°N 0.3732°W	II	Contemporary with its terraced neighbours at numbers 77 and 79, this three-storey cottage has a modern shop unit in the ground floor but retains original sash windows. The roof has been retiled and has had a dormer window inserted.	432850	
77 and 79 Portland Road	Worthing; 50.8119°N 0.3732°W	II	These early-19th-century cottages have walls of blue-grey brick with heavy yellow-brick detailing around the windows. Number 77 has two on each floor, but number 79 has blocked windows on its left-hand side. A second doorway next to number 77's entrance leads to a passageway; both are round-headed.	432851	
Hare and Hounds	Worthing; 50.8120°N 0.3732°W	II	This inn dates from the mid-to-late 19th century: the name was in use as early as 1852. Brickwork surrounds the windows, runs below the cornice and forms quoins at each end, but otherwise the building is of cobbled flint which has been painted over. The two storeys above the façade have centrally placed single windows.	432852	
83 and 85 Portland Road	Worthing; 50.8121°N 0.3732°W	II	Although they are attached to the Hare and Hounds, these cottages predate it by several decades. They are faced in grey render and have mansard roofs. There are two sets of blocked windows, two bay windows and attic dormers.	432853	
87 Portland Road	Worthing; 50.8122°N 0.3732°W	II	This short three-storey cottage is of painted cobbled flint in the style of the Hare and Hounds, but is older than that building. The single windows on each floor are offset to the right. There is attic space, but it lacks a dormer window.	432854	
89 Portland Road	Worthing; 50.8123°N 0.3732°W	II	This faces south, making it perpendicular to the other buildings on the west side of Portland Road with which it forms an architectural group. It has two storeys topped by a hipped roof of slate; the walls are faced with stucco. There are three sash windows.	432855	
90, 92 and 94 Portland Road	Worthing; 50.8124°N 0.3728°W	II	These three houses all have boat porches (unique to Worthing) around their entrance doors, which are on the right hand side in all cases. The stucco-faced buildings date from the early 19th century. Each has a single sash window to each of the three storeys.	432857	
1 and 1A Prospect Place	Worthing; 50.8094°N 0.3747°W	II	This mixed-use building dating from the 1820s has flint walls with some brickwork, dormer windows in the attic space above the upper storey and three large sash windows. The left-hand entrance door is very tall and has an arched head with a fanlight below.	433312	
10, 12, 14, 16 and 18 Prospect Place	Worthing; 50.8097°N 0.3745°W	II	This early-19th-century four-cottage terrace has experienced some alteration, especially to its doors and sash windows. Numbers 14, 16 and 18 are built of cobbled flint and have brick quoins; numbers 10 and 12 have stuccoed walls.	432860	
Former Worthing railway station	Worthing; 50.8185°N 0.3743°W	II	Used between 1845, when the line arrived from Brighton, and 1859, this two-storey cobbled flint building was converted to residential use but was threatened with demolition in the 1970s. Local builders Frank Sandell & Sons Ltd restored it and converted it into their offices. The five-window range has red-brick surrounds, and there is a corniced slate roof.	432862	
Chapmans (formerly Central Hotel)	Worthing; 50.8181°N 0.3756°W	II	Frederick Wheeler's 1898 Queen Anne-style station hotel has had several names, but was originally the Central Hotel. It was substantially altered and extended, especially to the rear, throughout the 20th century. The red-brick building has partly timber-framed gable ends. At the corner, a tower rises to a three-storey height and bears a green tiled dome.	468833	
St Mary of the Angels Church	Worthing; 50.8133°N 0.3773°W	II	Henry Clutton built Worthing's first Roman Catholic church in 1864. The dark brick French Gothic-style building has rose and lancet windows with elaborate tracery. A chancel was not added until 1939.	432943	
Parish Rooms at St Mary of the Angels Church	Worthing; 50.8134°N 0.3775°W	II	Built at the same time as the adjacent church and convent and using the same materials, this two-storey brick building with small, widely spaced sash windows forms an architectural group with them.	432944	
52, 52A and 52B Richmond Road	Worthing; 50.8141°N 0.3752°W	II	Charles Hide's imposing Tudor Revival villa of about 1840 uses various building materials—rubble, roughcast, cement, plaster and some exterior timber-framing. The first floor is partly jettied. A tall chimney-stack rises from ground level next to the entrance porch. Number 52A is the original slate-roofed rear wing.	433289	
Gate piers to the south of 54 Richmond Road	Worthing; 50.8137°N 0.3755°W	II	Four piers flank the entrance drive to number 54 Richmond Road. They were built at the same time as the house. The square structures are coated with stucco and are pedimented.	432942	
54 Richmond Road	Worthing; 50.8141°N 0.3757°W	II	One of several mid-19th-century villas built in this part of Worthing, Westerfields (as it was formerly known) has been attributed to John Rebecca and may date from 1837. It has three storeys to the left of a central bowed projection topped by a dome; the section to the right has two storeys. The stuccoed building has Italianate overtones.	432940	
Garden wall to the east of 54 Richmond Road	Worthing; 50.8141°N 0.3756°W	II	This section of flint wall, forming part of the eastern boundary of 54 Richmond Road's grounds, may predate the house.	432941	
Heslington House	Worthing; 50.8140°N 0.3760°W	II	A stuccoed villa built around the same time as its neighbour at number 54 Richmond Road, this is less elaborate in its exterior detail. The main wing has five sash windows on each of the two storeys, a central entrance porch with a tiled roof, and a large pediment in front of the corniced parapet. A later extension added a two-window wing in matching style. The large garden has been encroached upon by newer buildings.	432863	
Lloyds Bank, South Street	Worthing; 50.8114°N 0.3704°W	II	The building dates from the 1870s, but Lloyds Bank did not move in until 1961. The stuccoed exterior curves around one side of a major road junction—an effect achieved by four flat-fronted sections attached to each other at a slight angle. Each of the three storeys has an eight-window range with sashes. There is also attic space with dormer windows.	432957	
K6 Telephone Kiosk, The Steyne	Worthing; 50.8102°N 0.3674°W	II	This is an example of the standard K6 style of telephone booth designed by Giles Gilbert Scott in 1935. It is glazed on all four sides, built of red-painted cast iron and topped with a shallow dome-style roof.	433339	
War Memorial, The Steyne	Worthing; 50.8102°N 0.3667°W	II	This monument commemorating casualties of the Second Boer War consists of a pink-tinged granite tapering obelisk on a base of grey stone. Names are inscribed in gold on a central grey plinth.	433055	
Chatsworth Hotel	Worthing; 50.8109°N 0.3676°W	II	The Steyne Hotel, built by George Parsons in 1807, was Worthing's first. It was fashionable throughout the 19th century, but was bought by the adjacent Chatsworth Hotel in 1956 and became part of it. The original Chatsworth was converted from two houses in 1933. In its present form, the hotel extends along the four-storey pale brick and stuccoed terrace on the west side of the Steyne.	433054	
Adult Education Centre	Worthing; 50.8141°N 0.3695°W	II	This Classical-style stuccoed house with Ionic pilasters and sash windows has been much altered and converted for educational use. Built in about 1830, it has been extended at the sides.	433059	
Storm House (Haverfield house, Union place) formerly Conservative Headquarters.	Worthing; 50.8142°N 0.3687°W	II	Used by Worthing's Conservatives since 1954, and by The Royal British Legion and a private school before that, this plain stuccoed house was built (as Dewlish Lodge) in about 1845. It was soon renamed Haverfield House. It has recently been renovated by a Worthing-based charity, Storm Ministries, for use as their home and a place for the homeless to come for food and shelter (in the near future!). The upper floor is currently being used for office space. The façade has a three-window range, one of which (on the upper storey, below the hipped roof) is blocked.	433058	
Vestry of St Andrew's Church	Worthing; 50.8152°N 0.3772°W	II	This hall is contemporary with St Andrew's Church, with which it shares a wall. It is built of flint and stone and is dominated by slightly arched Perpendicular-style windows with five lights at the east and west ends. There is a flèche on the roof.	433062	
Vicarage of St Andrew's Church	Worthing; 50.8151°N 0.3772°W	II	The building materials of St Andrew's vicarage are the same as those of the church, but it dates from 1924. The street-facing front has two unequal gables with slit windows below. The main windows have prominent transoms and mullions.	433063	
St Andrew's Church	Worthing; 50.8153°N 0.3776°W	C	Sir Arthur Blomfield's Early English cruciform church in flint and Bath stone was started in 1882 but stood unused for six years while theological differences were overcome: it became the centre of angry dispute over High Church Anglicanism. The tall building has a steep roof, a three-bay nave, chancel arch, taller chancel and apsidal ends.	433061	
10 Warwick Place	Worthing; 50.8127°N 0.3648°W	II	This cottage, part of the 1830s Warwick Place development, was built around the middle of that decade. Its walls are stuccoed and have one sash window to each floor. The entrance door sits below a stuccoed boat porch. There is one chimney on the slate roof.	433345	
13 and 14 Warwick Place	Worthing; 50.8118°N 0.3692°W	II	Both mid-terrace cottages date from the 1830s and have stuccoed walls, sash windows and boat porches above the right-oriented entrance doors. Number 14's windows are wider and slightly bowed. The roofs are of slate.	433068	
15-18 Warwick Place	Worthing; 50.8119°N 0.3691°W	II	Forming a group with their contemporary neighbours at numbers 13 and 14, these four cottages are similar in style but share a separate higher roofline. Each has a boat porch on the right-hand side and a single sash window to each floor.	433069	
5 and 6 Warwick Place	Worthing; 50.8119°N 0.3696°W	II	These houses are earlier than their higher-numbered neighbours to the north: they date from the 1820s. Boat porches and original sash windows survive, although number 5 has an extra bay window which was added later. Both have three storeys.	433065	
7 Warwick Place	Worthing; 50.8119°N 0.3695°W	II	Wider and with a three-window range, this stuccoed three-storey cottage adjoins the two-storey part of the terrace. The boat porch and middle windows (the uppermost of which is blocked) are offset to the right, giving an asymmetrical appearance.	433066	
8 Warwick Place	Worthing; 50.8115°N 0.3693°W	II	The first of the two-storey cottages in this terrace dates from the 1820s and has a deeply recessed door under an ornately corbelled flat-roofed porch, instead of the boat porches used elsewhere. The slate roof and single sash windows are similar to those of its neighbours.	433067	
1-15 Warwick Road	Worthing; 50.8113°N 0.3645°W	II	Warwick Buildings-the former name of this terrace-dates from 1806. An enclosed wooden balcony runs along the front at first-floor level, but three houses have lost theirs. The doorways have arched openings accommodating fanlights. Each house is stuccoed.	433148	
Vintners Parrot	Worthing; 50.8116°N 0.3693°W	II	Roberts & Son wine merchants were founded on this site in 1808; they traded until in 1977, when the premises were sold and converted into a public house (formerly Thieves Kitchen and now the Vintners Parrot). The present structure, built in the late 1830s, is a pale brick Greek Revival block on two levels: there are four storeys to the left (with a three-window range) and two to the right (with two sash windows). Both have large cornices.	433150	
Storehouse of Messrs Colin Moore (formerly Stanford's Cottage)	Worthing; 50.8114°N 0.3683°W	II	The late-18th-century Georgian Stanford's Cottage, now a restaurant, was neglected for most of the 20th century: after it was vacated in 1906 it had various uses, including a shop and a storeroom, and has been partly hidden behind an extension. It is of painted brick with a central flat-hooded porch and a mansard roof.	433151	
24 and 26 Warwick Street	Worthing; 50.8117°N 0.3682°W	II	This three-storey, early-19th-century pair of houses has a single shop unit in the ground floor but retains its three-window range and stuccoed façade.	433152	
28 Warwick Street	Worthing; 50.8117°N 0.3681°W	II	This is the same age as its neighbour but lies at right-angles to it. There is a single window below the gabled roof facing the street; the longer side has a three-window range, one of which is blocked.	433153	
30, 32 and 32A Warwick Street	Worthing; 50.8117°N 0.3680°W	II	Park House was built the early 19th century and is now three units, one of which is housed in a later extension. The ground floor has a modern shopfront which does not face the street. The walls are stuccoed.	433154	
34, 36 and 36A Warwick Street	Worthing; 50.8118°N 0.3677°W	II	This corner building, now three separate premises, faces The Steyne as well as Warwick Street. It is a pale brick four-storey structure with small iron balconies, late-19th-century granite pilasters and a gable-end chimney.	433155	
45 Warwick Street	Worthing; 50.8120°N 0.3679°W	II	Home of grocery and dairy business Leal's for nearly a century, and modified with elaborate Jacobean-style embellishments at the time the firm moved in, this was built as a three-storey house in the 1870s. External features include pilasters, bay windows, a moulded cornice and multicoloured panelling.	433340	
5 Warwick Street	Worthing; 50.8110°N 0.3645°W	II	This early-19th-century three-storey building is dominated by a two-storey curved window above its 20th-century shopfront. The exterior is stuccoed and terminates in a parapet and cornice.	433149	
1-4 Caledonian Place	Worthing; 50.8097°N 0.3761°W	II	John Cranston's mid-1810s terrace, possibly designed by John Rebecca, was preserved in 1981 after being threatened with demolition. The end house has prominent green quoins and an entrance porch flanked by tapering columns. The slate-roofed, stuccoed terrace has three storeys, each with sash windows.	433158	
29 West Buildings	Worthing; 50.8097°N 0.3764°W	II	This plain 19th-century stuccoed building may originally have been a pub, but it now houses a shop with a modern façade. It is topped with a slightly recessed parapet. Two sash windows flank a blind window space of the same size.	433157	
9, 11, 15 and 15A West Buildings	Worthing; 50.8092°N 0.3763°W	II	John Cranston built the houses in this terrace (originally called John Street) in about 1825. They stood at Worthing's western end for many years afterwards, until development reached beyond later in the century. Each house has a three-storey curved façade with an iron balcony, a door below a semicircular fanlight and a two-window range.	433156	
16, 18, 20, 22, 24 and 26 West Street	Worthing; 50.8097°N 0.3775°W	II	These five cottages, and an unlisted sixth at number 14, share a tiled mansard roof with a brick cornice. Each has a single sash window (some of which are modern replacements) on each of the two floors. The front wall is stuccoed but the rear uses cobbled flint.	433159	
Worthing War Memorial	Worthing	II		1447552	
