= St Symphorian's Church, Durrington =

Church in West Sussex, England

St Symphorian's Church
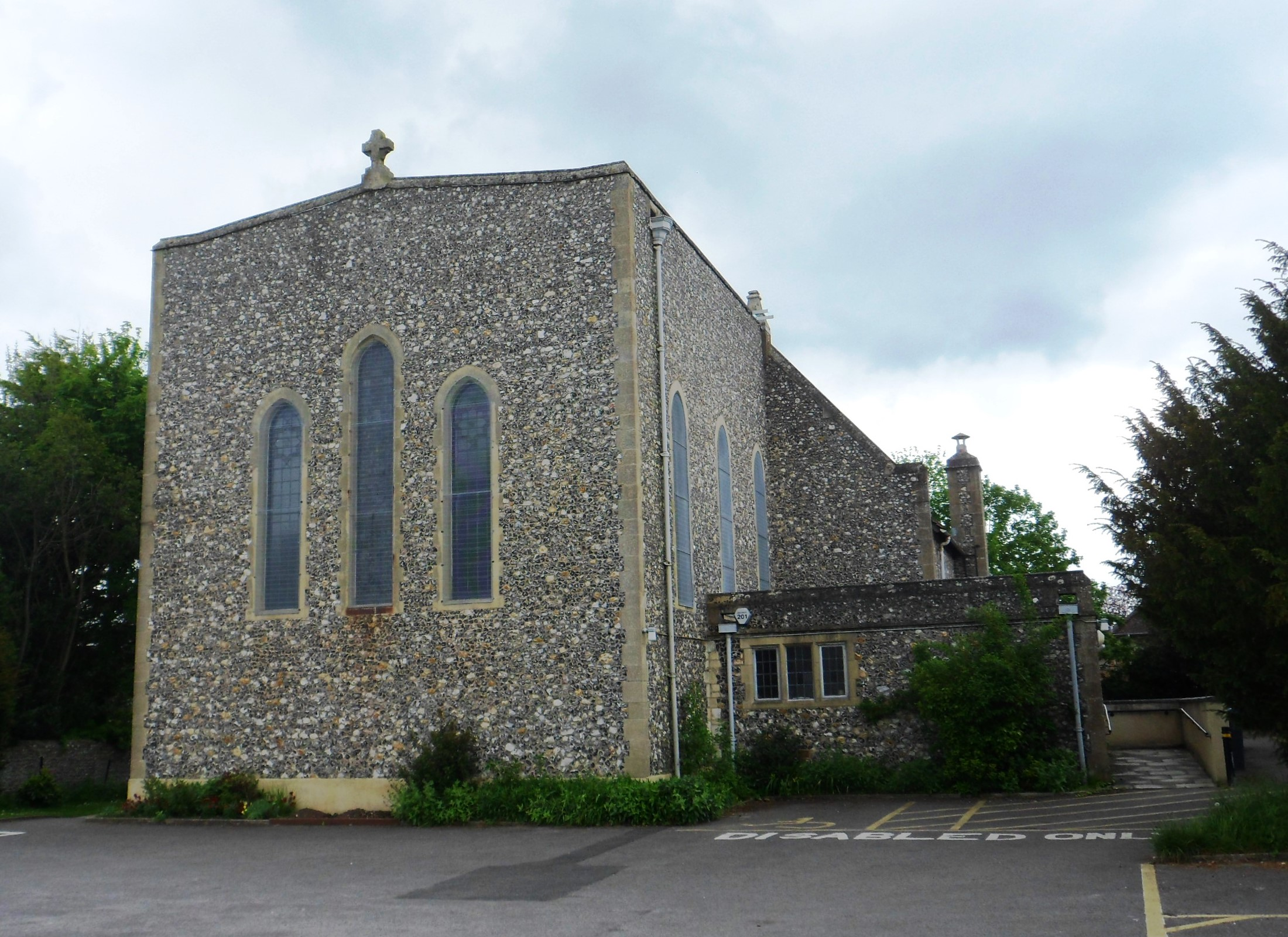
- The church from the east
- St Symphorian's Church
- 50.8364°N 0.4133°W
- Location: Durrington Hill, Durrington, Worthing, West Sussex BN13 3HU
- Country: England
- Denomination: Anglican
- Churchmanship: Modern Catholic
- Website: www.stsymphorians.co.uk

History
- Status: Parish church
- Founded: 10th/11th century (original church); 1890 (temporary replacement chapel); 1914 (present church)
- Dedication: Symphorian
- Dedicated: 13 October 1915
- Consecrated: 15 December 1916

Architecture
- Functional status: Active
- Heritage designation: Grade II
- Designated: 11 October 1949
- Architect(s): Lacy W. Ridge; W.H. Godfrey
- Style: Early English Gothic Revival
- Groundbreaking: 1914 (present church)
- Completed: 1941

Administration
- Province: Canterbury
- Diocese: Diocese of Chichester
- Archdeaconry: Chichester
- Deanery: Rural Deanery of Worthing
- Parish: Durrington

Clergy
- Priest: Fr Robert Norbury

St Symphorian's Church is an Anglican church in the Durrington area of the borough of Worthing, one of seven local government districts in the English county of West Sussex. The original 13th-century chapelry declined and fell into ruins in the 17th century, partly due to damage caused by the English Civil War. Anglican worship was re-established in a tin tabernacle in 1890 as the former village grew into a suburb of Worthing, and during World War I a permanent church was built. It was extended during World War II. English Heritage has listed the building at Grade II for its architectural and historical importance.

== History ==
Durrington was first recorded in 934 as a Saxon estate. In that year, King Athelstan granted some of the land to one of his thegns. By the time of the Domesday survey in 1086, Robert le Sauvage—Lord of the manor of nearby Broadwater—held the land. The civil and ecclesiastical parish was smaller than the Saxon estate: it extended for about 2 miles (3.2 km) from north to south and 0.7 miles (1.1 km) from east to west.

The Domesday survey recorded that Durrington had "a church, eight acres of meadow and a wood of ten hogs". The church had existed since Saxon times, no later than the 11th century, but little is known of it: the structure was probably built of plaster, wattle and daub and thatch, in common with other churches of the era. The new design, a simple two-cell building, had a 56 by 29 feet (17.1 m × 8.8 m) nave and a 23 by 19 feet (7.0 m × 5.8 m) chancel separated by a rood screen, above which was a crucifix. There was also a wall-mounted stone pulpit, a stone altar, a series of tall, pointed windows high in the walls, an unadorned stone font and a short wooden steeple—little more than an extended belfry—extending from the nave roof. The new church was still a chapelry of St Andrew's Church at nearby West Tarring: this meant that it was served and administered by clergy from that church, and most of the parish's tithes were paid to St Andrew's. It was not an independent parish church. The same applied to the nearby St Botolph's Church at Heene. Until agreement was reached in 1254, there was a long-running dispute between the rector of St Andrew's Church and Sele Priory over the division of the tithes. A small proportion of tithes were reserved for Sele Priory under arrangements made by Robert le Sauvage in the 12th century. When the priory was dissolved in 1459, the Bishop of Winchester William Waynflete acquired the patronage and made the tithes payable to Magdalen College, Oxford, which he had recently founded.

The church was wrecked during skirmishes linked to the English Civil War in the 1640s. In 1638, Reverend William Stanley became the rector of Tarring, which still had ecclesiastical responsibility for Durrington and Heene. His politics were strongly Royalist, but the villagers of Durrington were almost all Parliamentarian in outlook. He joined King Charles I's army when war broke out in 1641, angering his parishioners. The villagers' dislike of the rector was also prompted by his "unintelligible preaching", his failure to carry out parochial duties and his prosecution of some parishioners for non-payment of tithes. Their anger erupted in 1643 when, during a period of military action in Sussex, they partly demolished the church. He was removed from his role as rector in April 1645, but was restored 15 months later. Thereafter, he served the parishioners of Durrington infrequently, and reputedly threatened and spoke unpleasantly to them.

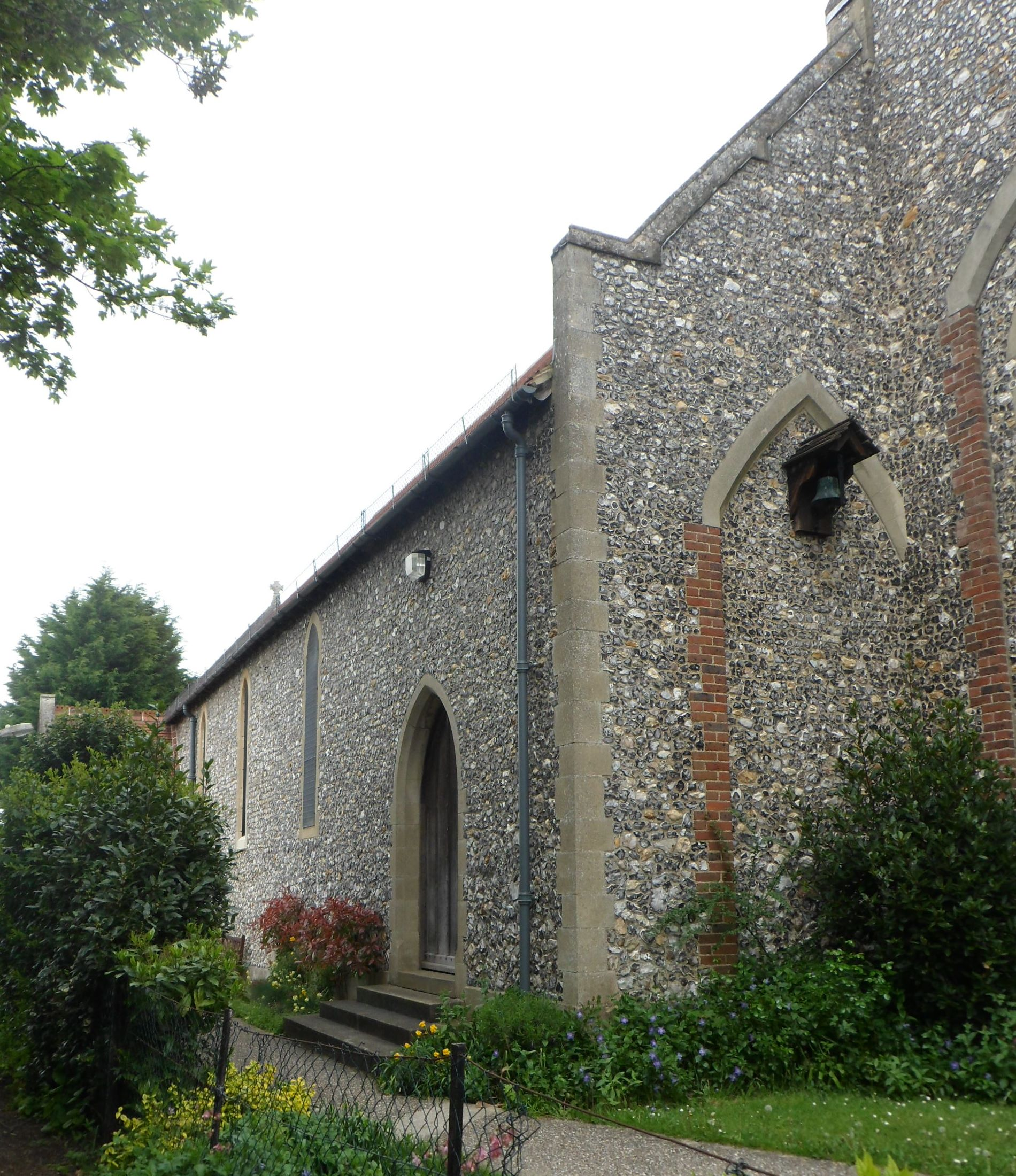
The church has a south aisle.

By 1677, the church was in such poor structural condition that the Dean of Chichester convened a consistory court with three parishioners and asked them why repairs had not been carried out. When they explained that it had been ruined during the Civil War, that Reverend Stanley had failed to serve them appropriately and that the parishioners could not afford its upkeep, the court accepted this. The parish was soon the subject of court action again, when the Dean found that the church bell had been sold without permission. After conflicting accounts were given, the churchwarden eventually admitted to selling it to raise funds for poor people in the parish. At the same time, he submitted an estimate for repairs to the church, stating again that the villagers could not afford them and asking for permission to abandon the building and worship at St Andrew's in West Tarring instead. This was agreed on 24 January 1680. The structure decayed further, and some of the masonry was used to build houses in the village. Nevertheless, the church was used occasionally until 1752, according to parish registers—mainly for baptisms, marriages and funerals, but a few services were held as well.

The area remained rural until the 19th century. Durrington village always had two centres of population: the southern one, next to the road to Littlehampton, had declined almost to nothing by 1875, but the part to the north near the church began to grow in the last quarter of the 19th century, stimulated by the success of neighbouring Worthing. The soil was of excellent quality, so land around the village was developed extensively for market gardening as well. In 1890, the new rector of St Andrew's Church paid for a small temporary mission chapel (a tin tabernacle) to be erected in the grounds of the ruined church. Services took place every Sunday, and parishioners from St Andrew's donated Eucharistic objects and a font.

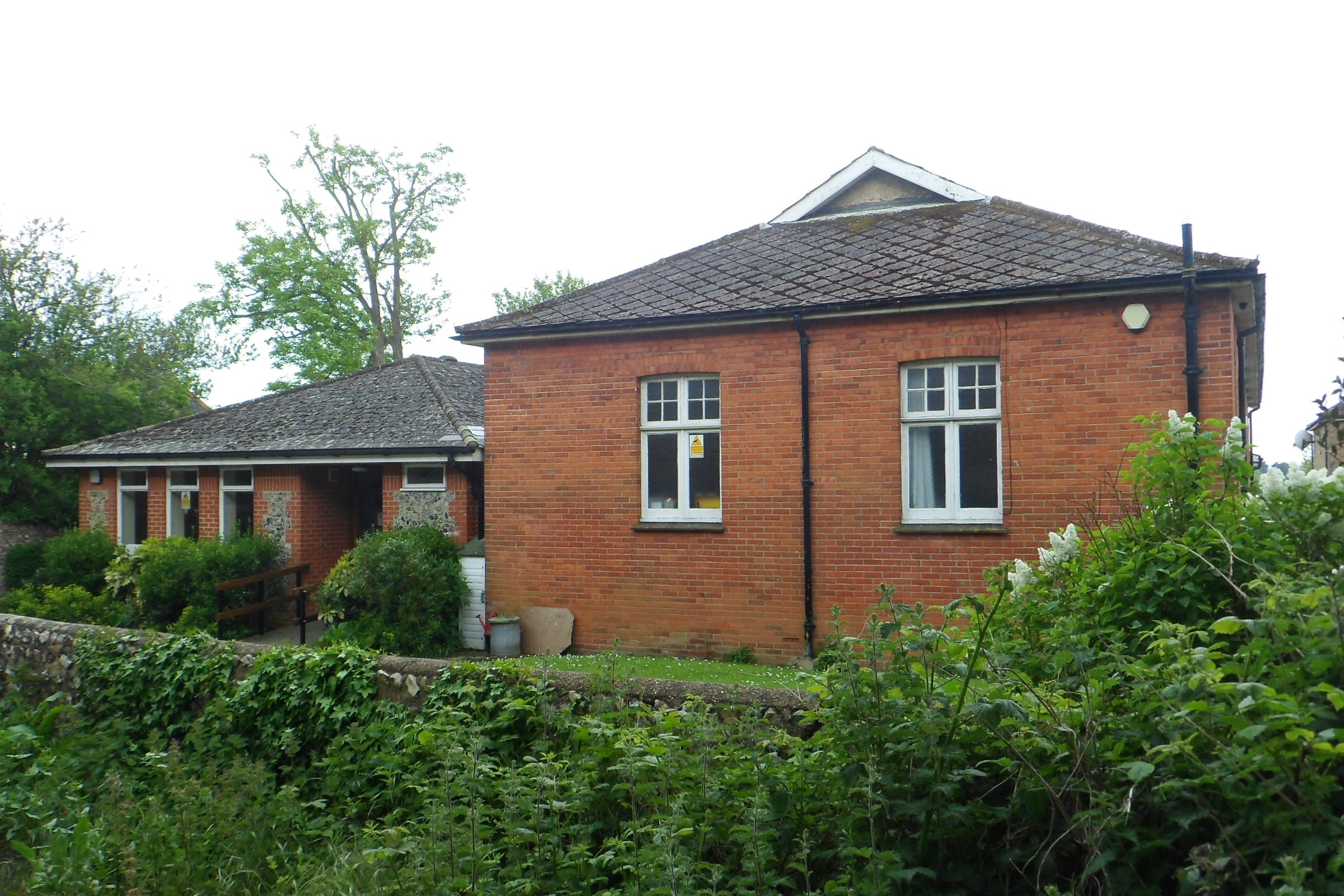
This church hall stands next to the church.

The next rector of St Andrew's planned to replace the tin tabernacle with a permanent church to commemorate Queen Victoria's Diamond Jubilee in 1897. He also sought to make the church independent from West Tarring by creating a separate parish for it. Fundraising was successful at first—£641 (£72,000 in 2025) was raised by 1898—but the rector left to take charge of another church in that year, and the impetus was lost. In 1910, when the temporary church needed urgent repairs, consideration was again given to building a proper replacement; and in 1911 the rector of St Botolph's Church in Heene—which had been successfully rebuilt from a ruined state and separated from West Tarring parish about 30 years previously—helped to drive the scheme forward. A committee was formed, and another £208 (£21,000 in 2025) of donations came in. The local architect R.S. Hyde, who had worked on St Botolph's Church, had submitted a design in 1896, but this was rejected in favour of plans by Lacy W. Ridge, who was at the time the Diocesan architect.

The parish of Durrington was taken put of plurality on 14 July 1914, and a new priest was appointed later in the year. Rebuilding started immediately: the remaining parts of the old walls (principally on the south and west sides) were incorporated into the new structure, and despite wartime disruption and shortages enough had been built to allow the church to be opened in 1915. It was dedicated to St Symphorian on 13 October 1915. No previous dedication of the church is known. A consecration ceremony took place on 15 December 1916. Durrington's rapid residential growth continued, especially after it became part of the Borough of Worthing in 1929, and the church was extended and thereby completed in 1941 with the construction of a chancel by W.H. Godfrey. The church was rededicated by the Bishop of Chichester George Bell on 3 September 1941. Lacy Ridge's work had cost £1,735 (£154,000 in 2025); the extension cost £4,509 (£197,000 in 2025).

Regular repairs and damp-proofing have been carried out since the church was completed: the decision to build around the remains of the 13th-century walls meant that damp was able to permeate and the new walls cracked. The roof also caused problems: in 1961 the timberwork had to be renewed after a woodworm infestation. Internal reorganisation and renewal was carried out throughout the 1960s and 1970s as well.

== Architecture ==
St Symphorian's Church is a flint structure with stone dressings, built in the Early English style. The roof is laid with tiles. The building has a wide nave leading into a taller chancel, a Lady chapel and a vestry. An entrance porch stands on the southwest side. The remaining 13th-century structural elements are in the north wall (visible on the inside around one of the windows) and its foundations, and in the south and west walls. A Saxon-era fragment from the original (pre-Domesday) chapel has also been identified in the north wall. Also, a piscina of medieval origin was rescued from the ruined chapel and placed on the east wall of the new church.

Inside, the nave roof, built by Lacy Ridge, is considered "remarkable". It is in two parts, the easternmost of which consists of a series of wide trusses. The chancel roof has beams supported on decorated corbels. Most of the windows in the church are lancets. The north wall has four, there are three on the south and east sides, and the west wall has two and a rectangular window with tracery work. Stained glass is set into several of the windows; one commemorates victims of the world wars.

Internal fittings and furniture include a white marble font taken from St Paul's Church in central Worthing; an 18th-century altar from a demolished church at Treyford, West Sussex; and an organ installed in 1954 (and rebuilt in 2006) to replace the original.

== St Peter's Church ==
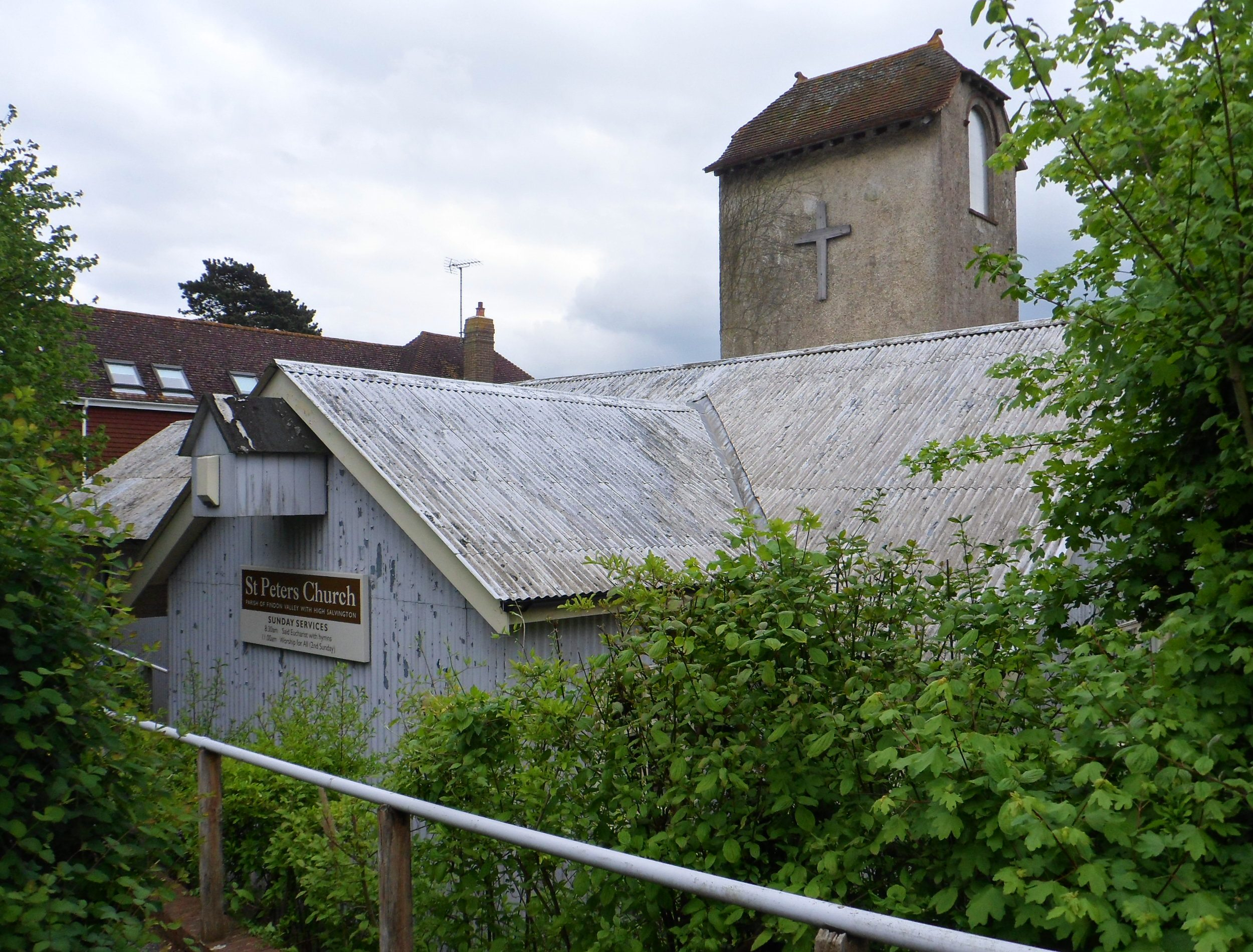
St Peter's Church serves the suburb of High Salvington. It was within St Symphorian's parish until 2010.

Residential development in the High Salvington area, north of Durrington and within its parish, encouraged the vicar of St Symphorian's Church to open a mission chapel there at his own expense. At first, services were held every two weeks (Evensong), augmented by a monthly Eucharistic service. Later this changed to weekly Matins and fortnightly Holy Communion. On 20 April 1951, after the vicar died, the church was sold to the parish for £600 (£16,000 in 2025). The church still had no dedication and was known simply as the Mission Church. On 3 July 1951, the Archdeacon of Chichester conducted a ceremony at which it was dedicated to Saint Peter.

St Peter's is an iron church (tin tabernacle)—now rare in Britain. It is the only surviving example in Worthing. Most of the internal fittings were donated by parishioners. In 2010 St Peter's Church and the area of High Salvington was transferred to the Parish of All Saints Church, Findon Valley.

== The church today ==
St Symphorian's Church was listed at Grade II by English Heritage on 11 October 1949; this defines it as a "nationally important" building of "special interest". In February 2001, it was one of 198 buildings with Grade II status (or the equivalent Grade C), and 213 listed buildings of all grades, in the Borough of Worthing. (These totals have since changed because of new listings and delistings.)

The parish, in its present form (ratified in 1974), covers the Durrington, West Durrington and High Salvington suburbs in the northwest of the borough of Worthing, and some surrounding rural areas. The eastern boundary is formed by Mill Lane, Half Moon Lane and Stone Lane; the main Littlehampton Road marks the southern boundary; and Titnore Lane and field boundaries form the other parts of the boundary.

There is a Eucharistic service every Sunday, daily morning and evening prayer sessions and a daily Eucharistic service.

== See also ==
- Listed buildings in Worthing
- List of places of worship in Worthing
