= List of places of worship in Worthing =

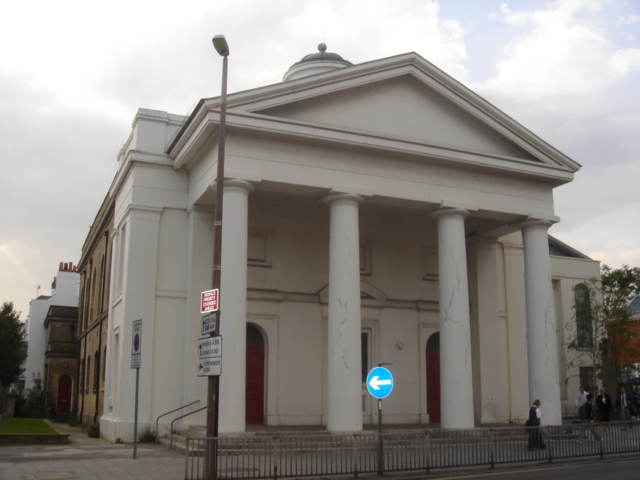
St Paul's Church was Worthing's first Anglican church. Built in 1812, it endured budget overruns, criticism of its distinctive Classical architecture and its pew rent policies, and structural problems; the last caused its closure in 1995.

The borough of Worthing, one of seven local government districts in the English county of West Sussex, has 43 extant, operating churches and other places of worship. Twenty-one other former places of worship are still in existence but are no longer in religious use. The district, on the south coast of England, is mostly urban: it consists of the seaside resort of Worthing, established in the 19th century, and its residential suburbs, ranging from ancient villages absorbed by the growing town to housing estates built after World War II.

Although not forming a majority, the largest proportion of the borough are Christians, and there is only one non-Christian place of worship, a mosque. The Church of England, the country's officially established church, is represented by more churches than any other denomination, but Worthing's first church was an Independent chapel. Protestant Nonconformism flourished in the early 19th century during the town's early development, while Roman Catholic worship (after the Catholic Emancipation) took root somewhat later.

English Heritage has awarded listed status to 12 of Worthing's extant churches and two former church buildings. A building is defined as "listed" when it is placed on a statutory register of buildings of "special architectural or historic interest" in accordance with the Planning (Listed Buildings and Conservation Areas) Act 1990. The Department for Culture, Media and Sport, a Government department, is responsible for this; English Heritage, a non-departmental public body, acts as an agency of the department to administer the process and advise the department on relevant issues. There are three grades of listing status. Grade I, the highest, is defined as being of "exceptional interest"; Grade II* is used for "particularly important buildings of more than special interest"; and Grade II, the lowest, is used for buildings of "special interest".

== Overview of Worthing and its places of worship ==
Worthing's location within West Sussex

The borough covers 8,030 acres (3,250 ha) of the English Channel coast and its hinterland in West Sussex, a county in southeast England. It is bordered to the west and north by the district of Arun, to the east by the district of Adur, and to the south by the English Channel.

The town of Worthing began as a development in the south of the parish of Broadwater, a manor of Saxon origin which at the time of the Domesday survey in 1086 was held by the Norman nobleman William de Braose, 1st Lord of Bramber. What began as a modest fishing village quickly grew into a popular residential area, helped by the concurrent development of fashionable Brighton further along the coast. Worthing absorbed Broadwater and other ancient centres such as Goring, Heene and West Tarring during the 19th century, and was incorporated as a borough in 1890.

The old villages had their own Anglican churches; Worthing itself was served by St Mary's Church in Broadwater until a chapel of ease, St Paul's, was built in 1812. It quickly became "the spiritual and social centre around which ... the town developed", despite financial difficulties and complaints that it failed to serve Worthing's poor. Several other Anglican churches were founded in the town centre during the 19th century, starting with Christ Church—which also started as a chapel of ease to St Mary's before it received its own parish. Declining congregations have resulted in overcapacity, and Christ Church was threatened with closure in 2006.

The first place of worship in Worthing, however, was an Independent chapel on the present Montague Street (formerly Cross Lane). Long since demolished and now the site of a shop, it was founded in 1804, and was rebuilt and re-established as a Congregational church in 1842 by Reverend L. Winchester, the founder of Congregationalism in the town. Nonconformism thrived in the early town. Various Independent and Evangelical congregations became established; Wesleyan Methodism was first recorded in 1811, and Primitive Methodism in 1865; Baptist meetings were held from 1878, and a Strict Baptist chapel existed from 1907; Brethren registered their first place of worship in 1892, and subsequently occupied various buildings; and many other denominations have been—and in some cases still are—represented. Roman Catholicism took until the middle of the 19th century to become established. The first permanent church, St Mary of the Angels, was opened in 1864; before that, Mass was celebrated in a local resident's private chapel and in the Sisters of Notre Dame de Sion's convent. St Mary of the Angels was parished from 1918, and the ministry grew substantially under the leadership of Canon James Purdon, its priest for 53 years. Other parishes were established in 1927 (Durrington; later moved to High Salvington), 1958 (East Worthing) and 1970 (Goring-by-Sea). The latter church, dedicated to the English Martyrs, is of little architectural merit but has one remarkable feature: a two-thirds scale replica of the Sistine Chapel ceiling, hand-painted by an untrained artist in six years.

== Mission halls ==
Worthing's Anglican churches established many mission halls—rudimentary chapels of ease administered by the founding church and serving newly developed residential areas—during the 19th and early 20th centuries. The town's haphazard, piecemeal, intermittently rapid residential development meant that such structures, which could be erected quickly, were needed to provide worship facilities until a more permanent arrangement could be made. All fell out of use or were replaced by a permanent church, but some of the buildings still stand.

Founding church	Mission hall	In use	Extant?	Status	Refs
Christ Church	Anglesea Street Mission	1880–1930s	Yes	Now used as a Scout hut	
Christ Church	Crescent Road Mission	1900s–1920s	Yes	Now part of a shop	
St Andrew's Church	Victoria Road Mission	c. 1900	No	Demolished	
St Botolph's Church	St John's Mission Room	1900	No	Replaced by St John the Divine's Church	
St George's Church	Emmanuel Mission	1911–1976	No	Replaced by permanent church, which was in turn demolished without replacement in 2008	
St George's Church	Ham Arch Mission	1885–1914	Yes	Now used as a workshop	
St George's Church	Newland Road Mission	1883–1936	Yes	Became a hall, then a school; now a photographic studio	
St Mary's Church	Broadwater Mission Hall	1903–c. 1993	No	Replaced by Queen Street Church Centre	
St Paul's Church	Church of the Good Shepherd	1906–1963	No	Demolished in 1973	

== Religious affiliation ==
According to the 2021 United Kingdom census, 111,336 people lived in the borough of Worthing. Of these, 43.92% identified themselves as Christian, 1.72% were Muslim, 0.66% were Hindu, 0.63% were Buddhist, 0.25% were Jewish, 0.11% were Sikh, 0.7% followed a religion other than these, 45.71% claimed no religious affiliation and 6.3% did not state their religion. The proportion of Christians was slightly lower than the 46.32% in England as a whole; Buddhism and other religions were also practised more widely in Worthing than nationally. Islam, Hinduism, Judaism and Sikhism had significantly fewer followers than average: in 2021, 6.73% of people in England were Muslim, 1.81% were Hindu, 0.92% were Sikh and 0.48% were Jewish. The proportion of people with no religious affiliation was higher than the national figure of 36.67%.

== Administration ==
All Anglican churches in the borough of Worthing are part of the Diocese of Chichester, whose cathedral is at Chichester in West Sussex. The Rural Deanery of Worthing—one of five deaneries in the Archdeaconry of Chichester, which is in turn one of three archdeaconries in the diocese—covers the borough in its entirety and includes some churches in neighbouring districts.

The Roman Catholic Diocese of Arundel and Brighton, whose cathedral is at Arundel, administers the four Roman Catholic churches in Worthing. Worthing Deanery, one of 13 deaneries in the diocese, includes the parishes of Goring (Church of the English Martyrs), East Worthing (St Charles Borromeo Church, and a church in Lancing in the neighbouring district of Adur) and Worthing (St Mary of the Angels Church in central Worthing and St Michael's Church in High Salvington), as well as other parishes outside the borough.

== Current places of worship ==
Current places of worship
Name	Image	Location	Denomination/ Affiliation	Grade	Notes	Refs
St Mary's Church (More images)	Rear view of a stone church with a castellated tower at the far end. The nearest side has very dark stone, two heavy buttresses and a three-light lancet window with trefoils. Trees surround the church on all sides, and there are several gravestones in front.	Broadwater; 50.8278°N 0.3733°W	Anglican	I	Broadwater's parish church has Saxon origins, but the present structure is late Norman. Nairn and Pevsner noted that the cruciform building, of flint with stone dressings, has impressive arches. The chancel was extensively remodelled in the 19th century.	
St Mary's Church (More images)	The tower, spire and part of the body of a dull grey church building. The stepped tower has one round window and one pointed-arched louvre, and is topped with a spire and weather-vane. Two recessed two-light lancet windows with quatrefoils are on the near side, which is partly obscured by a tree.	Goring-by-Sea; 50.8130°N 0.4246°W	Anglican	II*	Decimus Burton rebuilt this late Norman church in the Gothic style in 1837. Hans Feibusch's mural representing Christ in Majesty, designed in 1954, is above the chancel arch. The exterior is rendered.	
St Andrew's Church (More images)	Three-quarter view of a stone church with a buttressed tower in the foreground. This has small battlements and a spire. The nave roof, below which are four small, evenly spaced windows, is visible, but its aisle and an attached porch are obscured by a bush. There are gravestones and a table tomb in the foreground.	West Tarring; 50.8247°N 0.3958°W	Anglican	II*	West Tarring's partly 13th-century parish church, in the Early English style, has Italian mosaic designs by William Butterfield in 1885, when a major restoration took place. Its longstanding ecclesiastical status as a peculier of Canterbury Cathedral may have influenced its design.	
Christ Church (More images)	A long, flint-built church with a tall squared-off tower in the foreground, seen from close proximity.	Worthing; 50.8132°N 0.3737°W	Anglican	II*	Worthing's second Anglican church, built in 1840–1843 as a chapel of ease to Broadwater and parished in 1855, was reprieved from closure in 2006. The flint building also uses artificial stone—an early example of this. The chancel was altered in 1894, when a hammerbeam roof—likened to Bryant and May matchsticks by Harry Stuart Goodhart-Rendel—was added.	
St Symphorian's Church (More images)	Front view of a flint church with a tall square façade topped with a small stone cross and with two round-headed windows flanking a taller, narrower one. There is a paved parking area in front.	Durrington; 50.8364°N 0.4133°W	Anglican	II	The ancient parish church was wrecked during the English Civil War, and remained disused until Lacy W. Ridge built a new structure incorporating its remains. It opened in 1916 and was extended (with a chancel) in 1941.	
St George's Church (More images)	Three-quarter view of a long, low, brown brick and stone church with a high, red-tiled roof. An extension with two separate rooflines protrudes from the left side; it is topped by a small stone spire. There are three large windows on the same side.	East Worthing; 50.8142°N 0.3573°W	Anglican	II	George Truefitt's Bargate stone, Decorated Gothic-style church was consecrated in 1868 and extended in 1875 and 1884. The chancel and adjacent aisle have large apses, and there is a bell-tower with a spirelet. The interior was refitted in 1990–91.	
St Botolph's Church (More images)	Side view of a long flint-built church with several parts, each with a different roofline. A spire is visible behind the body of the church. All windows are framed by brickwork.	Heene; 50.8136°N 0.3867°W	Anglican	II	The ancient chapel at Heene was ruined by the 18th century and partly dismantled in 1766. A fragment remains near the present church flint and stone church, built in the Early English style in 1873 by Edmund Scott and enlarged in 1905.	
St John the Divine Church (More images)	Three-quarter view of a long flint church with an extremely wide, stumpy tower on the left. This is topped with a dumpy grey spire. The brown church roof is heavily discoloured. A tree in full leaf obscures the near corner.	West Worthing; 50.8147°N 0.4004°W	Anglican	II	In 1937, N.F. Cachemaille-Day built a brick and flint church to replace a mission chapel linked to St Botolph's. This building of 1900 was incorporated into the new structure, which was extended in 1965 when the short, broad tower and spire were added.	
St Andrew the Apostle's Church (More images)	A low-roofed, wide, cobbled flint church with several sections, facing a road behind a wall of the same material. On the right, partly obscured, is an apse with plain stone-dressed lancets; next to it is the body of the church, with tall round-headed windows. In the foreground is a spirelet and a low extension with a five-light window.	Worthing; 50.8153°N 0.3774°W	Anglican	II	Worthing's first "High Church" Anglican church was so controversial that it stood unused for six years while liturgical differences were thrashed out. Arthur Blomfield's Early English church, eventually consecrated in 1888, uses flint and stonework extensively.	
Queen Street Church Centre (More images)	A modern building in two shades of red brick, behind a low black fence. White-framed three-paned windows line the side wall and flank the entrance—a double door sheltered below a protruding section supported on brick columns. This has a plaque reading "QUEEN STREET CHURCH CENTRE" and a pentagonal window.	Broadwater; 50.8240°N 0.3760°W	Anglican	–	This combined church and community centre was built in 1993–1994 on the site of the former Broadwater Mission Hall, administered from St Mary's Church. The present church is part of St Mary's parish.	
St Stephen's Church	A long, low building of brick with a tiled roof, with extensions on the near side (next to a car park) and at the front. Behind the flat-roofed entrance porch is a semicircular window and a white crucifix. The nearer of the extensions on the left has a small chimney-stack.	East Worthing; 50.8231°N 0.3604°W	Anglican	–	Between 1929 and 1959, this was a mission chapel to St Mary's Church in Broadwater; but it was consecrated in 1959 and became a separate church in its own right. It remains within the parish of St Mary's.	
All Saints Church (More images)	Nearly side-on view of a long brick building with a dark brown tiled sloping roof, set behind a grass verge in the foreground. An entrance porch with a round-arched doorway projects forward. Above this is a small bell.	Findon Valley; 50.8504°N 0.3959°W	Anglican	–	A church hall, erected in 1936, was used for services in this interwar housing estate until Leonard Keir Hett's brick church of 1956 was consecrated on 22 February of that year. The congregation chose the dedication. The church was parished in 1989, and St Peter's Church at High Salvington was added to the parish in 2010.	
St Laurence's Church (More images)	A long, low brick building in two non-aligned parts. Nearer the camera, in three-quarter view, is a hall with white soffits and window-frames; the windows are immediately below the roofline. Behind it, in profile and mostly hidden, is a longer building of brown and red brick and with a steep, high roof.	Goring-by-Sea; 50.8090°N 0.4074°W	Anglican	–	Part of the parish of Goring-by-Sea, this church was founded in 1936. An attached hall was added in 1962. The interior has a 15th-century altarpiece retrieved from St Mary's Church, Slaugham.	
St Peter's Church (More images)	Very close view of a low iron church with a corrugated iron roof and a stone tower. This has a low brown cap-style roof and a projecting crucifix.	High Salvington; 50.8485°N 0.4081°W	Anglican	–	The vicar of St Symphorian's Church paid for a tin tabernacle to be erected in High Salvington in 1928. It was part of St Symphorian's parish between 1951 and 2010—since when it has been linked to All Saints Church at Findon Valley—and is Worthing's only iron church.	
St Richard's Church (More images)	Three-quarter view of a simple brick church behind a low, curved wall. A flat-roofed entrance porch sits below a large, concrete-dressed, pentagonal, seven-light window. On the roof just above this window is an extremely thin spire on top of a greenish metal ball, topped with a bird-shaped device.	Maybridge; 50.8210°N 0.4183°W	Anglican	–	This postwar housing estate north of Goring-by-Sea received a permanent church in 1966, when Romilly Craze's brick building opened. A church hall designed by John Leopold Denman had accommodated services since 1954. A parish was created in 1980.	
St Matthew's Church (More images)	Three-quarter view of a pale flint and dark red brick church on a corner site. The tiled roof sweeps down from the nave over the aisle, from which a side chapel and an entrance porch extend. Tall lancet windows and brick buttresses are visible to the right. A small bell-tower in the shape of a spire straddles the roof.	Worthing; 50.8179°N 0.3830°W	Anglican	–	R.S. Hyde's Early English-style church has an apse and a narrow flèche, and uses locally quarried flint. It was built in 1899 and extended with vestries and aisles in 1911.	
Broadwater Baptist Church (More images)	Front view of a shallow-roofed brick building with a flat-roofed entrance porch with "Broadwater Baptist Church" in blue lettering. Between this and the main roofline, there is a white crucifix, a regular pattern of single protruding bricks and a series of extremely narrow glazed ribs.	Broadwater; 50.8270°N 0.3648°W	Baptist	–	R.W. Brough's 1968 brick structure is the successor to a church hall used since 1937 by Broadwater's Baptist community, which had first met in 1881 in a former stable. Another building, registered as Baptist School Chapel, on a site on nearby Penfold Road was also used between 1904 and 1937.	
East Worthing Baptist Church (More images)	Three-quarter view of a small building in brown and red brick with unobtrusive brick buttresses. The façade has a double entrance door flanked by paired 2x4 windows, a white crucifix and four 2x6 windows. The side wall has paired 2x4 windows with one extra window closest to the near corner. The roof has brown tiles.	East Worthing; 50.8156°N 0.3525°W	Baptist	–	In 1933, an Evangelical community founded a church in East Worthing; it was opened by Worthing's mayor the following year. The Baptist Church acquired the building, a brick structure designed by T.R. Hyde, in 1946. As East Worthing Evangelical Free Church it was registered for worship in December 1934; it was re-registered for Baptists in January 1947.	
Findon Valley Free Church (More images)	Three-quarter view of a pale brick building with prominent white soffits. The entrance area in the left foreground is flat-roofed and has a wide brown door flanked by posters. Above this, a tall window reaches to the slightly sloping roofline; it is split into nine unequal panes. There are six windows of decreasing height on the side elevation.	Findon Valley; 50.8475°N 0.3966°W	Baptist	–	The present octagonal-shaped building was designed by R.W. Brough in 1958 and registered in October of that year, but this church has its origins in a church founded by Worthing Baptist Church in Findon in 1906, before the Findon Valley estate existed. It moved to a wooden building there in 1939.	
West Worthing Baptist Church (More images)	A brick building of two distinct parts, joined halfway up the far building's roof. Both parts front a road and are partly obscured by cars. The far section has a tall arched window, steep roof and flat-roofed rounded entrance porch. The near section has two four-paned windows (the higher of which sits below a semicircular brick detail), a shallower roof and skylights.	West Tarring; 50.8199°N 0.3926°W	Baptist	–	The present building is in three linked parts: Resta Moore's original "school chapel" of 1900, which superseded a hall used by the Baptist community since 1890; Norman Myers's 1938 extension; and an adjacent community and social centre completed in 1988. The church was registered in July 1938, replacing the original building.	
Worthing Baptist Church (More images)	Front view of a wide three-part flint church with red brick dressings. The main (left) section is flanked by stone spires and has a large four-light lancet window with quatrefoils and a sexfoil, and two single-light lancets. In the middle is a narrow, low entrance section. To the right is a plain-walled section with three lancets and an arched window.	Worthing; 50.8159°N 0.3752°W	Baptist	–	Worthing's first permanent Baptist place of worship opened on this site in 1881. Resta Moore built an extension of brick and flint four years later, and two more enlargements followed as the church's popularity grew. Its members helped to establish several Baptist churches within and outside Worthing. The church was registered for the solemnisation of marriages in April 1886.	
Worthing Tabernacle (More images)	Front view of a pale stone building dominated by a large rose window sitting on six narrow windows of varying height. The main body, with the rose window and two spirelets, is flanked by identical recessed sections with round-arched entrances and paired rectangular windows.	Worthing; 50.8148°N 0.3712°W	Evangelical	II	James Lund's pale stone and dark brick building blends the Gothic and Romanesque Revival styles and has a distinctive rose window. It was built in 1908 to accommodate the Evangelical congregation who had previously worshipped at the Montague Street Tabernacle Chapel (built in 1839), and was registered in July of that year.	
Maybridge Community Church (More images)	Three-quarter view of a vernacular-style brick building in two parts, behind a black fence and flanked by a grass area and a car park. The near part has two storeys with three windows above the entrance door and irregularly placed windows on the side wall. The far section has a long, steep roof and one storey.	Maybridge; 50.8188°N 0.4186°W	Evangelical	–	Founded in 1954 on the Maybridge housing estate, this Evangelical church is associated with the Worthing Tabernacle. The original structure, part of a former hospital, was rebuilt here; it has since been extended. As Maybridge Evangelical Free Church it was registered for worship in February 1955 and for marriages in February 1969.	
West Worthing Evangelical Church (More images)	A cottage-style building with a modern extension to the left. The main body is of brick and white-painted pebbledashing; there is some timber-framing below the roofline. There are two round windows and two white plaques with the words "GOD IS LIGHT" in ornate writing. These flank a wide arched window.	West Worthing; 50.8162°N 0.3985°W	Evangelical	–	James Lund, designer of the Worthing Tabernacle, adopted a different design—the Queen Anne style—for this church of 1912, built to serve an Evangelical community who had worshipped at a private house since 1900.	
River of Life Church	A plain building in very dark brick. In the foreground is a flat-roofed entrance area with two wooden doors and a small window (partly obscured). Behind this, a squat tower, with a central window, rises in several stages.	Worthing; 50.8216°N 0.3735°W	Evangelical	–	This Art Deco building was used by Christian Scientists between 1939 and 1987; it replaced a 1921 structure on the same site. After that congregation moved to West Worthing, the church was acquired by a congregation planted out of the New Life Church at Durrington. Under the name Oasis Centre, it was registered for worship and for marriages in May 1993, and it has also had the name Broadwater Christian Fellowship.	
Clifton Community Church (More images)	Three-quarter view of a steep-roofed brick building with large areas of stone dressing, especially on the entrance porch. The façade has two tall and two shorter pointed-arched windows and a round window, all with green tracery. The side wall has large rectangular windows.	Worthing; 50.8164°N 0.3782°W	Evangelical	–	This Gothic-style stone and brick church has been used by several religious groups, including Baptists and Brethren, since it opened in 1905, and has undergone many changes of name. Its present status is Evangelical.	
St Mary of the Angels Church (More images)	Three-quarter view of an ornate brick building with pale stone dressings and recessed lancet and round windows. A rose window dominates the left-hand side. Perpendicular to its right, there is an arched entrance porch; beyond that is an octagonal tower with louvre-style openings below a conical spire.	Worthing; 50.8132°N 0.3773°W	Roman Catholic	II	Henry Clutton's brick and Portland stone French Gothic-style church—Worthing's oldest public place of Roman Catholic worship—was opened in 1864 and completed in 1939 when Frederick Walters added a chancel.	
Church of the English Martyrs (More images)	A low, grey stone-faced building behind a car park, with a security fence to the right. The front section (with a double entrance door) is wide and flat-roofed; behind this a red-tiled pointd roof rises to cover the main body of the church. All soffits are a weathered red colour. An 11-light window with some white panelling and a crucifix above dominates the façade.	Goring-by-Sea; 50.8158°N 0.4277°W	Roman Catholic	–	The concrete church opened in 1968 to replace Jupp's Barn, the former barn of Jupp's Farm, which dated from 1771: this had been converted into a church in 1934 and registered in 1952. It is now the church hall. In the present "utilitarian concrete" church, parishioner Gary Bevans painted a scale replica of the Sistine Chapel ceiling on the ceiling between 1988 and 1993.	
St Michael's Church (More images)	Three-quarter view of a wide, blocky, pale brick building set behind a large grassy area. There are four sections of different sizes and heights, each with a flat roof. A wide entrance is in the leftmost projection; on the side wall next to it is a tall crucifix. White drainpipes are prominent on the exterior.	High Salvington; 50.8419°N 0.4049°W	Roman Catholic	–	This church moved to its present location in 1966 from Durrington, where the parish was formed in 1927 and a chapel was erected in 1938. The modernist design "departs from any conventionality" according to English Heritage. It was registered for worship and for marriages in October 1966.	
Offington Park Methodist Church (More images)	A wide, long brick building consisting of an entrance porch with a dark-tiled roof and white facing, flat-roofed extensions flanking this, a taller main body with five tall three-pane windows, and a square corner tower with a green flat roof and thin spire.	Broadwater; 50.8290°N 0.3808°W	Methodist	–	The Wesleyan Methodist community acquired this site in 1928; the first church was opened in 1932 and was registered in October that yar, but it was replaced in 1958 with a new 400-capacity brick structure by architect Graeme Highet. The new building was registered in March 1959. Additions were made in the grounds in the 1970s.	
Goring Methodist Church (More images)	Side view of a long, barn-like brick building with an off-centre extension on the near side, above which is a star-shaped metal spire on top of a metal crown-like device. Small rectangular windows are placed at regular intervals. A cobbled wall, bench and grass verge are in the foreground.	Goring-by-Sea; 50.8135°N 0.4301°W	Methodist	–	Methodist worship in Goring-by-Sea started in a local hall in 1945, and a permanent church was built six years later by John Leopold Denman. The long, low brick building has a small bronze spire. It was registered for worship in March 1951 and for marriages in April 1952.	
Goring United Reformed Church (More images)	A shallow-roofed building with an extension at the left rear. The façade has small, regularly spaced concrete protrusions, but is mostly brick. In the centre of this section is a tall 4x5 window extending to the roofline. A wide, flat-roofed entrance area sits in front of this. A series of angled ground-to-roof windows run down both sides.	Goring-by-Sea; 50.8162°N 0.4102°W	United Reformed Church	–	World War II delayed the construction of this church for 11 years until 1949; a school was used for worship instead. The building, which was registered in April 1949, became the church hall in 1961 when a new church, in brick and concrete and with exterior walls forming a series of V-shapes, opened.	
Emmanuel United Reformed Church (More images)	A small brown brick structure unrelieved by dressings or other ornamentation, and partly obscured by shadow, trees and a noticeboard. In the centre is a relatively tall, narrow tower with two arched openings near the top.	Heene; 50.8122°N 0.3860°W	United Reformed Church	–	Founded in 1926 as St Columba's Presbyterian Church, the original church (registered in 1932) became the church hall in 1937 when it was replaced by an Art Deco structure with a tower and variegated brickwork to the design of Frederic Lawrence. St Columba's and Shelley Road United Reformed Churches united in 2005 when the building in Shelley Road was closed.	
Worthing Christadelphian Church (More images)	A small, low hall in two colours of brick, with brown-framed windows and a matching double door flanked by blue posters. Above this is a blue panel with "THE WORTHING CHRISTADELPHINS" and a round window.	Worthing; 50.8167°N 0.3783°W	Christadelphians	–	This community worships in a church used between 1961 and 1969 by Theosophists, who had a presence in Worthing from 1924. The structure was altered in 1989. It was registered for marriages by Christadelphians in September 1971.	
St Demiana and Pope Kyrillos VI Coptic Orthodox Church (More images)	A pale stone church on a corner site, with a dominant square tower with spirelets. To the left of this is the entrance, below a four-light lancet window and three sexfoils. To the right is the main body of the church, with two side chapels and lancet windows.	Worthing; 50.8118°N 0.3664°W	Coptic Orthodox	–	Architect John Wills was commissioned to build a replacement for the Bedford Row Methodist Chapel; his Early English style building, in rag-stone and featuring a corner tower, was completed in 1899 and opened in 1900. The church was reprieved from closure in 2003, at which time it was called Steyne Gardens Methodist Church, but it was announced in July 2015 that it would close at the end of August that year (by which time it had been renamed Cornerstone Methodist Church). It was bought by the Coptic Orthodox Church in Britain and Ireland in 2017 and opened the following year.	
Christian Brethren Hall (More images)	A two-storey building with a dark brick façade dominated by a central gabled stuccoed section. This has recess for the wooden entrance door and an arched window. Both storeys have six small windows with blue frames.	West Worthing; 50.8178°N 0.3951°W	Exclusive Brethren	–	This small hall, built and registered in 1934 but given its present appearance by a 1950s remodelling, is the only extant Brethren place of worship in Worthing; three others are no longer used. It is part of the Exclusive Brethren movement which separated from what is now the Plymouth Brethren Christian Church in 1970.	
Kingdom Hall (More images)		West Worthing; 50.8175°N 0.3953°W	Jehovah's Witnesses	–	This opened in 2015 on the site of the former Second Church of Christ, Scientist in Grand Avenue near West Worthing railway station. The purpose-built Kingdom Hall replaced a converted house on nearby South Street which had been the fifth Jehovah's Witnesses place of worship in Worthing since the denomination was established locally in 1922. The new building was registered for marriages in July 2015.	
Church of Jesus Christ of Latter-day Saints, Worthing Chapel	A pale brown brick building with an off-centre roof whose left side slopes down to half the height of its highest point. The left wall, below this, has evenly spaced square windows. The red entrance door is partly obscured by a tall, brown and silver mast-like structure. Trees obscure other parts of the building.	Goring-by-Sea; 50.8182°N 0.4330°W	Latter-day Saint	–	The congregation, whose first meetings were held in 1964, numbered more than 300 by the 1980s, so a permanent church was built. The brick building opened in 1984 and was registered for worship and for marriages in August of that year.	
Elim Church Worthing	A converted early 20th-century house with bay windows and some black-and-white panelling. A low, flat-roofed extension on the near side has an entrance door above three concrete steps. A wooden fence obscures the lower half of the ground floor.	Worthing; 50.8208°N 0.3725°W	Pentecostal	–	Since the Elim Tabernacle in Grosvenor Road closed in 1982, the Pentecostal community has used several venues, including this converted house on Broadwater Road.	
Friends Meeting House (More images)	A converted house behind another house, whose side wall partly obscures the meeting house. A car is parked in front of the ground floor, which has three large windows with brickwork between them. The upper storey is painted white and bears the words "FRIENDS MEETING HOUSE".	West Worthing; 50.8144°N 0.3962°W	Quaker	–	Quakers first met in Worthing in the 1920s and were peripatetic until 1945, when a private house was registered. In 1958 they opened their own meeting house behind Mill Road, bought the previous year for £7,000, and registered it in January 1958. The building was originally a garage and boathouse. The premises have been shared with Spiritualists, Unitarians and others at various times.	
Salvation Army Citadel (More images)	A tall building with deep red brickwork and yellowish stone dressings. There are two identical entrances: wooden doors in recessed stone doorways with prominent yellow keystones. A window to their left is in a similar recess. Two pediments flank a stone frieze with the words "THE SALVATION ARMY". The upper floor has two rectangular windows and a central arched window with another keystone.	Worthing; 50.8104°N 0.3766°W	Salvation Army	–	The Army has a controversial history in Worthing: their arrival in 1883 caused riots, led by a mob called the Skeleton Army. Peaceful relations had been established by the time a permanent citadel replaced temporary barracks accommodation in 1912. The building was registered in 1919.	
Worthing Spiritualist Church (More images)	A tiny building with a steep brown-tiled roof. Four side windows resemble flattened pentagons and are separated by straight sloping buttresses. An identical window sits immediately above a narrow wooden structure above the entrance door.	Worthing; 50.8128°N 0.3738°W	Spiritualist	–	This Art Nouveau-influenced building, designed by a local architect, was opened for worship by Sir Arthur Conan Doyle in 1926, although it was built earlier. Its original name, under which it was registered in April 1926, was Spiritualist Mission Church.	
Masjid Assalam (More images)	A brown-brick, flat-roofed, warehouse-style building. The lower half of its façade has been painted cream and decorated with arch-shaped window and door surrounds attached to the walls. On the first floor there are three two-pane windows and one single window. The side wall is mostly blank, with some small windows.	Worthing; 50.8193°N 0.3700°W	Sunni Islam	–	Worthing's mosque doubles as a cultural and social centre for the local Muslim population. An early-morning arson attack in 2005 caused substantial damage, but the building has been repaired. The mosque, which was registered in March 1995, had more than 1,000 worshippers in 2003.	

== Former places of worship ==
Former places of worship
Name	Image	Location	Denomination/ Affiliation	Grade	Notes	Refs
Holy Trinity Church (More images)	A dark red church dominated by a tower on the left. This has stone spirelets at each corner and a central slate-coloured spire, and is partly obscured by trees. There are five lancet windows in a slight recess in the wall to the right.	Worthing; 50.8113°N 0.3786°W	Anglican	II	Late 19th-century housing development in the Gratwicke area west of the town centre resulted in the building of this church in 1882–1883. It was parished almost immediately. Henry Coe and S. Robinson's Early English design, in dark red brick, lacked the present tower; this was added in 1888. The church has been disused and empty since 2014.	
St Paul's Church (More images)	A Classical-style, stuccoed building whose façade is dominated by four tapering columns supporting a pediment. The side wall is yellow brick. Partly hidden behind the columns are two red round-headed doors. Above the pediment is a partly hidden cupola. A modern extension is partly visible to the right.	Worthing; 50.8137°N 0.3714°W	Anglican	II	An 1809 Act of Parliament allowed St Paul's to be built as a chapel of ease to St Mary's Church in Broadwater; it remained in force until 1893, when a parish was formed. It thrived as Worthing's reputation as a fashionable seaside resort grew, and the sale of pews to visitors brought in much money. John Rebecca's stuccoed brick building with Doric columns and cupola became structurally unsound and was closed in 1995.	
Anglesea Street Mission	Three-quarter view of a tall, two-storey, plain-walled, white-painted building with a pointed roof. The front has one blank window and a half-blank, half-glazed window flanking a narrow door, above which is an orange sign. There are also six circular protrusions. The side wall has three windows and a thin metal flue.	Worthing; 50.8169°N 0.3789°W	Anglican	–	Christ Church's first mission hall was opened in the 1880s, originally under the name Clifton Road Mission Hall. Under its present name, Verrall Hall, it is a Scout headquarters.	
Crescent Road Mission (More images)	Side view of a two-part, plain-walled building in shadow. The nearer section is flat-roofed, painted cream and has two blank windows with a wide pillar between them. Rubbish bins and scaffolding are to the left. The far section is white, has a pointed roof whose end resembles a pediment, and has two identical red-framed windows.	Worthing; 50.8102°N 0.3761°W	Anglican	–	Originally a non-denominational mission chapel, this was taken over by Christ Church and used as a mission hall. It is now part of an adjacent shop.	
Newland Road Mission (More images)	A dark red brick hall on a corner site, with adjoining houses in an identical style. The hall, partly obscured by a traffic light, has a pointed-arched entrance with a wooden door below a rectangular window frame with three lancets. To the right of the door, there are three plain windows between brick buttresses. Above the entrance is a steep roof perpendicular to the main roof.	Worthing; 50.8184°N 0.3686°W	Anglican	–	Built in 1883 by St George's Church to serve new housing near the railway, this red-brick chapel, designed by George Hewer, was used until 1936. Under the new guise of Forester's Hall, it has been a school and a photographic studio.	
Ham Arch Mission	An extremely small workshop adjoining a house and standing behind a wooden gate with white gateposts. It has green double doors with an open door to their right. Above this is a white-painted wall which is heavily draped with ivy, although a circular louvre is clearly visible through this. The roof is steep and pointed.	East Worthing; 50.8194°N 0.3538°W	Anglican	–	Named after a nearby railway bridge, and ironically known as "The Cathedral" locally, this tiny hut—now a workshop—was served from St George's Church for 29 years from 1885.	
Bedford Row Methodist Chapel (More images)	Three-quarter view of a wide, long stuccoed building, with the side wall more prominent. This is mostly a blank wall, but there are three windows towards the rear. The façade has three tall windows tapering from bottom to top; the central window has a small pediment and is shorter than the others to accommodate an entrance door. Above the roofline is a large pediment with louvred circular opening.	Worthing; 50.8114°N 0.3690°W	Methodist	II	Worthing's first Wesleyan Methodist chapel, the Providence Chapel of 1822, was replaced by this pedimented, stuccoed, Neoclassical building, with tall, tapering windows, in 1840. It passed into secular use in 1900 when the church in Steyne Gardens (now Cornerstone Methodist Church) replaced it, and is now the function room of the Vintners Parrot pub.	
Lyndhurst Road Methodist Church (More images)	A low, pointed-roofed building of dark red brick. The tiled roof has some discolouration. Two identical rooms protrude from each side of the façade, flanking two blue entrance doors; both rooms have boarded-up windows. A wide, six-light window with ornate tracery sits above the doors. There is a small turret on the roof. Shrubs are growing up the side of the building.	East Worthing; 50.8169°N 0.3556°W	Methodist	–	An iron chapel for Primitive Methodists opened in Chapel Road in 1880, moved to Lyndhurst Road in 1893 and was superseded by H.K. Armitage's Perpendicular Gothic church in 1929. The Methodist Church declared it redundant in 2005, and permission was granted to establish a children's centre in it.	
Methodist Providence Chapel (More images)	Close-up front view of a cobbled flint building with brick dressings and a white-painted area around the entrance door, which is reached up a ramp. The lower storey has two sash windows; these are linked to the upper storey's two semicircular-headed windows by areas of white panelling. The building is topped by a flint pediment with a semicircular louvre.	Worthing; 50.8109°N 0.3691°W	Methodist	–	This chapel was built in 1822 in a Neoclassical style using flint cobblestones on the exterior. After the new chapel in nearby Bedford Row was built in 1840, it was unused until 1852, when an independent Christian group took it on. It was subsequently registered by the Old Baptist Union between 1896 and 1906. The building now houses a youth club.	
Tarring Road Methodist Church (More images)	Front view of a tiny, plain chapel of irregular flintwork and red brick dressings. A dark stone plaque below a slit window near the roofline reads "WESLEYAN CHAPEL". An entrance porch is flanked by two wide, low-set windows with pointed arches.	Worthing; 50.8179°N 0.3795°W	Methodist	–	This Wesleyan chapel, completed in 1884, cost £735 (£79,000 as of 2025). The brick and flint building was designed by R. Hollands. Latterly known as Cornerstone Hall, its registration for marriages and worship was cancelled in August 2015, and it is now a Montessori nursery school.	
Montague Street Tabernacle Chapel	A wide, flat-roofed shop with a pediment. The lower storey has a black shopfront with plate glass windows; the upper storey has three wide rectangular windows. All exposed areas of wall are painted white.	Worthing; 50.8104°N 0.3707°W	Independent	–	This 1839 building had many uses (hall, theatre, temporary church) until 1888, when it became the non-denominational Worthing Free Church. The Worthing Tabernacle was founded in 1895, and the building was re-registered under that name the following year. It moved to its new premises in 1908, after which it was renamed St James's Hall and used as an entertainment venue. It is now a shop.	
New Street Chapel	A stuccoed two-storey building with a double shopfront. On the upper storey there are four unevenly spaced rectangular windows. A large pediment with a central circular recess sits above this.	Worthing; 50.8101°N 0.3755°W	Independent	–	This was built in the Classical style in 1861 for Independent Evangelicals to the design of Charles Hide. It declined after its founder, John Adams, died, and closed in 1906. The building, including the prominent pediment, survives behind a shop façade.	
Bedford Row Gospel Hall (More images)	A single-storey, cream-painted, grey-roofed building attached on the right side to a two-storey house. There is an entrance porch with a white door, semicircular transom light and the lettering "GOSPEL HALL". On each side are two tall semicircular-arched windows. A lean-to extension to the left has a similar but much narrower window. All windows and doors are boarded up.	Worthing; 50.8103°N 0.3688°W	Open Brethren	–	This stuccoed building of around 1850 was in religious use by 1908, when it was registered by the Old Baptist Union. They moved out in 1928 and Open Brethren took it on. From 1977 it was described as an Evangelical church. It has fallen out of use and is unoccupied as of 2025.	
Brethren Gospel Hall	A white stuccoed hall, partly in shadow and linked at its left corner to the wall of a larger building, which partly obscures it. An entrance porch has a grey double-door and a semicircular transom light, two lamps and a plaque reading "Gospel Hall". The porch obscures two semicircular-arched windows, above which is a pediment with a round window.	West Tarring; 50.8253°N 0.3931°W	Open Brethren	–	This tiny chapel, now in residential use, is set back from Tarring's ancient high street. It is in a simple Classical style with a pediment and oeil de boeuf. Services were held from 1860 until 1992, although the premises were not formally registered until May 1923 (with the name Tarring High Street Chapel).	
Elim Tabernacle (More images)	Three-quarter view of a single-storey white-painted building with a bright red tiled roof. The nearest wall is blank, and partly hidden behind a flat-roofed extension and a flint wall; the side wall has a sign and two green-framed windows; beyond that is a slightly protruding entrance area with a curved upper section.	Worthing; 50.8135°N 0.3737°W	Elim Pentecostal	–	George Jeffreys, founder of the Elim Pentecostal Church in the United Kingdom, established this church in 1931. The small building, opposite Christ Church, was registered for worship in May 1932 and was used until 1982; a nursery school now occupies it.	
St James's Evangelical Free Church (More images)	Front view of a squat, red-brick building with a steep pointed roof and prominent stone dressings. There are four identical spirelets: two ending about halfway up the building and two level with the top of the roof. A pointed-arched window, split by mullions into ten panes, dominates the façade. Below it are two entrance doors and the word "ten" in purple lower-case letters.	Worthing; 50.8124°N 0.3674°W	Evangelical	–	T.H. Winney's Perpendicular-style building was used as an Evangelical church from 1926 until 1988, when it became a restaurant and bar. Its original name, under which it was registered between 1926 and 1949, was St James's Hall in reference to the building in Montague Street where the congregation previously met, although when its registration was finally cancelled in February 1989 it was called Worthing Evangelical Free Church.	
Kingdom Hall	A converted house whose downstairs windows and entrance door are covered with white-painted panels. The three upper-storey windows are glazed and have brown frames. An entrance porch is carried on spindly columns.	West Tarring; 50.8211°N 0.3922°W	Jehovah's Witnesses	–	This converted house was the fifth Jehovah's Witnesses place of worship in Worthing. The denomination, which was first established in the town in 1922, registered it in 1980. It was used by three Worthing-based Congregations of Jehovah's Witnesses: Broadwater, Durrington and Tarring. In 2013, a planning application was submitted to construct a purpose-built Kingdom Hall on the site of the disused Second Church of Christ, Scientist on nearby Grand Avenue. This was approved, building work was completed in 2015, and the old building's marriage registration was cancelled in July 2015.	
Gospel Hall (More images)	Three-quarter view of a small brick building with a brown tiled roof. There are six windows in the side elevation; at the front is a central entrance porch formed by a projecting section of tiled roof supported on two thin brick columns. A wooden fence partly hides the right-hand side of the building.	Durrington; 50.8327°N 0.4127°W	Plymouth Brethren Christian Church	–	Planning permission for this meeting hall on Birkdale Road was granted in 1990. It had a capacity for about 60 worshippers and was part of the Plymouth Brethren Christian Church. In June 2011 the charity Scope stated that they had "recently" bought it and converted it into a social and activity centre. Now, with the name Ashdown Club, it is now used for similar purposes by the charity Guild Care.	
St Charles Borromeo Church (More images)	Front view of a smooth, bright yellow artificial stone cruciform church behind a low brick wall and shrubbery. Three "arms" of the cross are visible, and a squat tower with a shallow roof rises above them. Five sets of tripled round-arched windows with thin tracery are visible; those on the nearest face sit above the arched entrance door and below a gold statue.	East Worthing; 50.8208°N 0.3546°W	Roman Catholic	–	A dolphin sculpture above the door of this Neo-Romanesque, cruciform, artificial Cotswold stone church alludes to the earlier use of the Dolphin Inn for services. Henry Bingham Towner's building opened in 1962 and was registered in April of that year. It closed at the start of the COVID-19 pandemic, and in June 2021 the Diocese of Arundel and Brighton decided to sell the church and its site for redevelopment and combine the remaining churches in Worthing and Lancing into one parish.	
Ebenezer Strict Baptist Chapel (More images)	Front view of a small, grey- and red-brick chapel with a steep red-tiled roof and a lower extension to the right. An entrance porch, with bushes to its left, has an arched black door which is half open. To the right are two identical windows with slightly curved upper panes and red-brick patterning above. Three buttresses protrude slightly from the façade.	Worthing; 50.8129°N 0.3729°W	Strict Baptist	–	In 2005, planning permission was granted for the conversion of this Strict Baptist chapel into a house. The congregation formed in 1887 worshipped elsewhere until 1907, when the chapel was built. It was registered for worship six years later.	
Shelley Road United Reformed Church (More images)	A wide terracotta-coloured brick building in two parts: to the left, a two-storey structure with three lancet windows above the arched entrance porch, spirelets and recessed parts with paired and single lancets, all topped with a triangular roof with vertical recessed sections; and to its right, a rounded single-storey section with single lancets separated by buttresses.	Worthing; 50.8112°N 0.3746°W	United Reformed Church	–	This brick and terracotta Early English-style building served the Congregational (later United Reformed Church) community from 1903 until 2005, when the congregation moved to the renamed Emmanuel Church—formerly St Columba's. Its registrations for worship and marriages, granted in November 1903, were cancelled in January 2006.	

== See also ==
- Listed buildings in Worthing
- List of demolished places of worship in West Sussex
- Media related to Religious buildings in Worthing at Wikimedia Commons

== Notes ==
=== Bibliography ===
- Bridgewater, Peter (2007). An Eccentric Tour of Sussex. Alfriston: Snake River Press. ISBN 978-1-906022-03-7.
- Davies, Roger (1990). Tarring: a Walk Through its History. Tarring: Roger W. Davies. ISBN 0-9516309-0-3.
- Elleray, D. Robert (1977). Worthing: a Pictorial History. Chichester: Phillimore & Co. ISBN 0-85033-263-X.
- Elleray, D. Robert (1985). Worthing: Aspects of Change. Chichester: Phillimore & Co. ISBN 0-85033-551-5.
- Elleray, D. Robert (1998). A Millennium Encyclopaedia of Worthing History. Worthing: Optimus Books. ISBN 0-9533132-0-4.
- Elleray, D. Robert (1999). St Paul's Church, Worthing: a History and Description. Worthing: Optimus Books. ISBN 0-9533132-1-2.
- Elleray, D. Robert (2004). Sussex Places of Worship. Worthing: Optimus Books. ISBN 0-9533132-7-1.
- Evans, Nat (1977). The Church and Parish of Durrington. Worthing: Gadd's.
- Hare, Chris (1991). Historic Worthing: The Untold Story. Adlestrop: The Windrush Press. ISBN 0-900075-91-0.
- Kerridge, Ronald; Standing, Michael (2000). Worthing: From Saxon Settlement to Seaside Town. Worthing: Optimus Books. ISBN 0-9533132-4-7.
- Pé, Diana (2006). Mid Sussex Church Walks. PP (Pé Publishing). ISBN 0-9543690-2-5.
- Vigar, John E. (1986). Exploring Sussex Churches. Rainham: Meresborough Books. ISBN 0-948193-09-3.
- Williamson, Elizabeth; Hudson, Tim; Musson, Jeremy; Nairn, Ian (2019). Sussex: West. The Buildings of England. New Haven and London: Yale University Press. ISBN 978-0-300-22521-1.
- No. 11: Worthing. West Sussex Local History Mini-Guide to Sources. Chichester: West Sussex County Council. 2000. ISBN 0-86260-465-6.
