= James Jepson Binns =

British organ builder (c.1855–1928)

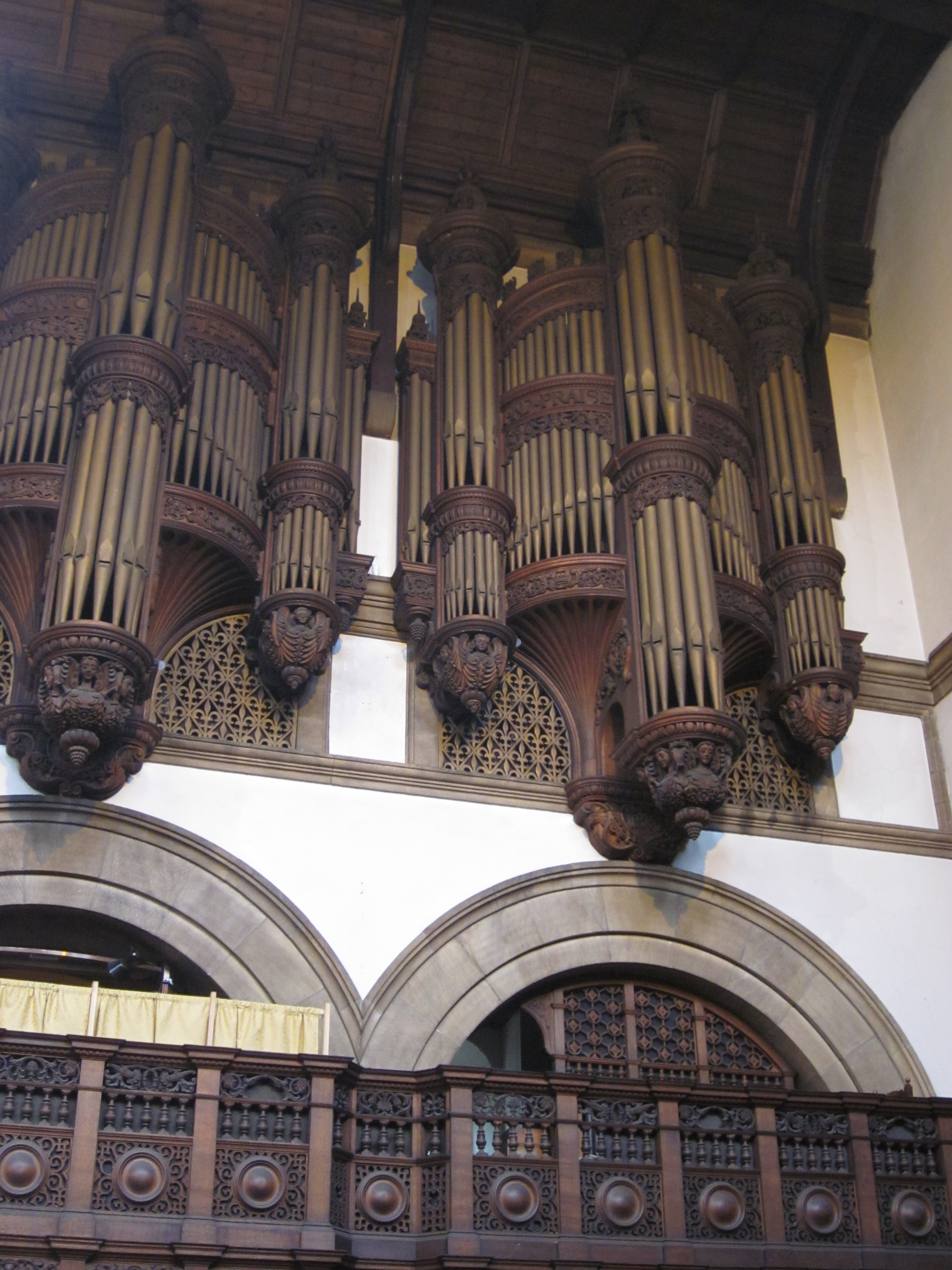
An organ by Binns in St Aidan's Church, Leeds, 1896

James Jepson Binns (c. 1855–11 March 1928) was a pipe organ builder based in Leeds, West Yorkshire, England.

== Organs ==
Pipe organs at the following locations were either built or rebuilt by James Jepson Binns or his JJ Binns company. A number of these buildings have been demolished and the organs broken up or destroyed. Many original Binns organs in this list have been subsequently rebuilt by other organ builders.

- Albert Hall, Nottingham – built by Binns in 1909, replacing a Brindley & Foster destroyed by fire.
- All Saints' Church, Stamford – the 1890 Hill organ was rebuilt by Binns in 1916.
- Baillie Street Methodist Church. Rochdale – built 1892. Building demolished, but organ acquired by Christ Church, Worthing in 1967.
- Castle Street Methodist Church, Cambridge has one of the last organs built before Binns's death.
- Central Methodist Church, Hucknall - c.1930 - Binns pipe organ built by James Jephson Binns and one of the last organs to be built by this renowned organ builder. Originally installed in Trinity Methodist Church then reinstalled when the church building was redesigned in 1989.
- Christ Church, Patricroft, City of Salford – built 1896.
- Christ Church, Great Ayton – build date uncertain, possibly around 1899.
- Christ Church, Worthing, acquired from Baillie Street Methodist Church, Rochdale in 1967 and rebuilt by Percy Daniel & Co. in 1970.
- Christian Science Society, Wimbledon, installed 1945, originally built for Sixth Church of Christ, Scientist, London
- Church of St Thomas the Martyr, Newcastle upon Tyne – work on the 1902 Vincent and Co. organ by Binns, Fitton and Haley in 1931.
- Eldon Wesleyan Methodist Church, Woodhouse Lane, Leeds (demolished). Organ relocated to Lidgett Park Methodist Church, Leeds
- Church of St Thomas, Stanningley, Pudsey, purchased 1906 by Dr James Varley-Roberts, Restored 1946, (Binns, Fitton and Haley). Leeds, West Riding (Yorkshire, West) Pudsey – Stanningley (SE2234), St. Thomas (Anglican Parish Church)
- Farnsfield parish church of St. Michael – build date unknown.
- Fulneck Moravian Church – 1930 work on 1748.Schnetzler organ
- G.E. Franklin, Derby – 1903. Moved to Castle Gate Congregational Centre in 1909.
- Galston Parish Church – 1913. – 3-manual pipe organ by J.J.Binns installed in 1913. It has an electro-pneumatic action patented by the organ maker. Centenary celebrations for the organ commenced with a Songs of Praise in Galston Parish Church on Sunday, 10 February 2013, featuring the congregation, organist and choirmaster Graeme Finnie and the Church Choir – along with international mezzo-soprano Linda Finnie. The service was conducted by Rev. Alastair Symington, locum tenens during the church's vacancy. Representatives of the Scottish Historic Organ Trust visited the church on 27 April 2013 to examine, photograph and play the organ. The British Institute of Organ Studies, in June 2013, awarded the Galston Organ a Grade 2* Historic Organ Certificate, the second highest grade of certificate awarded. A Celebrity Organ Recital was held on Saturday, 19 October at 7pm, featuring international organist Ian Hare.
- George Street Methodist Church, Little Driffield – 1906. Moved to Acomb Methodist Church, Front Street, York in 1964. This organ is known locally to be one of the finest examples of the work of this well renowned organ builder. It is home to many tonal delights, and has stood the test of time. During 2009 a major restoration of the pedals was undertaken, and in 2010, the organ was awarded an Historic Organ Certificate.
- Gilcomston South Church – 1902.
- Providence Congregational Church, at Whitle, New Mills – 1914.
- Jesmond Parish Church, Tyneside (also known as Clayton Memorial Church) – rebuilt in 1913 with four manuals, but contains pipework from an earlier T. C. Lewis organ.
- Jesus College Chapel, Oxford, 1899.
- Kingsway Hall, Holborn – 1912.
- Lothersdale Methodist Church, Op. 191, 1896, II/P/15. Church closed in 2010; instrument is currently undergoing an extensive rebuild in Germany.
- Queens' College, Cambridge.
- Rochdale Town Hall pipe organ, built by Binns in 1913, rebuilt by J.W. Walker & Sons Ltd in 1979
- Springburn Public Halls, Glasgow – 1905, building closed 1985 and demolished 2012.
- St Aidan's Church, Leeds – 1896.
- St. Bartholomew's Church, Barrow.
- St. Catherine's Church, Ventnor.
- St. Dunstan's Church, Benoni, South Africa. The Ben Dijkman Organ was originally built in the 1870s by Binns in Leeds and installed in the NG Kerk in Queenstown. In 1925 it was brought to Benoni for the Dutch Reformed Church in Benoni. They sold it to St. Dunstan's in 1948 and it had to be totally rebuilt and enlarged in 1961 when the church was extended. Approximately one-third of the present pipework and most of the air-chests are original, however, the case is new. Christian Ganser was the Organ Builder.
- St. Edward the Confessor, Barnsley
- St. George's Church, Hartlepool. Three-manual Binns organ built in 1904 and last renovated in 2015.
- St James' Church, Norlands, 1895. Originally installed in the organ chamber above the Lady Chapel, the instrument was moved to its current position in the West Gallery in 1921.
- St. John's Church, Deptford, London – 1901.
- St. John's Church, Haifa, Israel – 1914.
- St. Laurence's Church, Frodsham (also recorded as St. Lawrence's) – 1882-3 and rebuilt by J.J. Binns in 1923.
- St. Laurence's Church, Norwell, Nottinghamshire – 1908.
- St. Mary's Church, Astbury- 1912 for King's Hall, Stoke, but presented to St. Mary's by Stoke City Council in 1962 and rebuilt and installed by Reeves & Merner.
- St Nicholas Buccleuch Parish Church, Dalkeith. This organ was originally built for the West Parish Church, Dalkeith, but was moved to its current location in the early 1990s upon the union of the two congregations.
- St. Paul's Church, Boughton.
- St. Peter's Church, Harrogate – work on 1879 Edmund Schulze organ.
- St. Stephen's Comelybank Church, Stockbridge, Edinburgh – 1902.
- St. Wilfid's, Calverley, West Yorkshire – 1894.
- Stoke Minster – 1899, moved from private residence by unknown organ builder in 1927.
- Wesley Chapel, Harrogate – 1912.
- Former Wesleyan Chapel, Rodley, Leeds, had a Binns organ, recorded there in 1886 and 1888, and photographed between 1902 and 1914. The chapel was demolished in 1973.
