= Worthing Tabernacle =

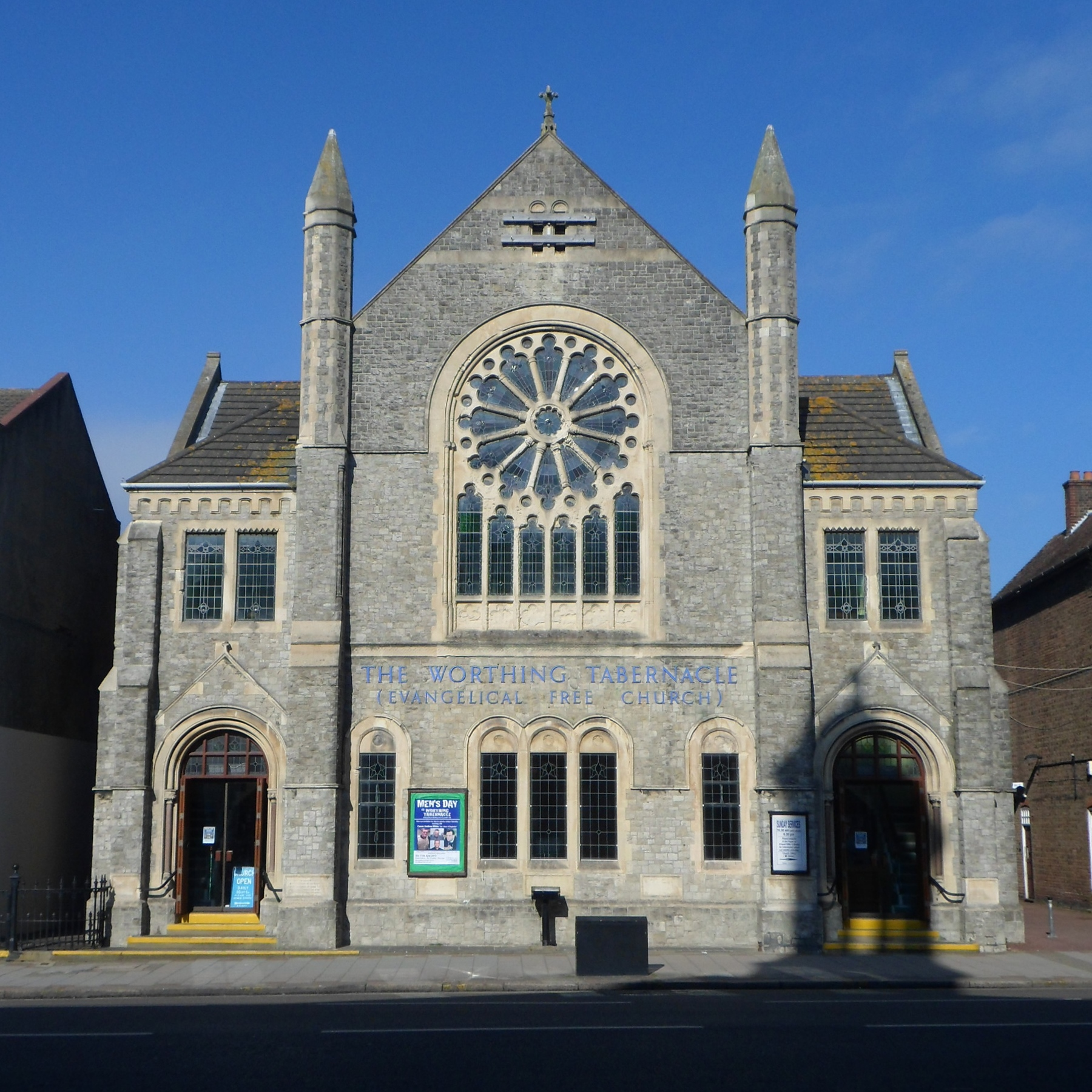
- The church from the west
- Worthing Tabernacle
- 50.8148°N 0.3712°W
- OS grid reference: TQ 14856 02960
- Location: 64 Chapel Road, Worthing, West Sussex BN11 1BN
- Country: England
- Denomination: Evangelical
- Website: www.worthingtab.org.uk

History
- Status: Chapel
- Founded: 1895 (in Montague Street)
- Founder: C. Douglas Crouch
- Events: 1895: Founded in former Independent chapel in Montague Street; 1908: Moved to Chapel Road

Architecture
- Functional status: Active
- Heritage designation: Grade II-listed
- Designated: 2 December 1988
- Architect: James Lund
- Style: Gothic/Romanesque Revival
- Completed: 1908

Worthing Tabernacle is an independent Evangelical Christian church in the town and borough of Worthing, one of seven local government districts in the English county of West Sussex. The present building, with its distinctive pale stone exterior and large rose window, dates from 1908, but the church was founded in 1895 in a chapel built much earlier in the 19th century during a period when the new seaside resort's population was growing rapidly. In its present form, the church is affiliated with the Fellowship of Independent Evangelical Churches. English Heritage has listed the building at Grade II for its architectural and historical importance.

== History ==
Many places of worship were founded in Worthing after its incorporation as a town in 1803: the following decades were a period of rapid growth as a prestigious seaside resort. One such chapel was built in 1839—probably by Charles Hide, a locally important architect and builder—on Montague Street (the old road to Heene), for independent (non-denominational) Christian worship. The chapel was known as the Tabernacle. It later became associated with Calvinism and Congregationalist worship, and was also used briefly in 1854 as an Anglican church (during which time it was temporarily dedicated to St John the Baptist). By 1893, when local architect Resta Moore had designed a new Classical-style façade, the building had been renamed Montague Hall (and later St James's Hall) and had been used for many purposes: it held concerts, theatre productions and lectures as well as the religious services of various Christian denominations.

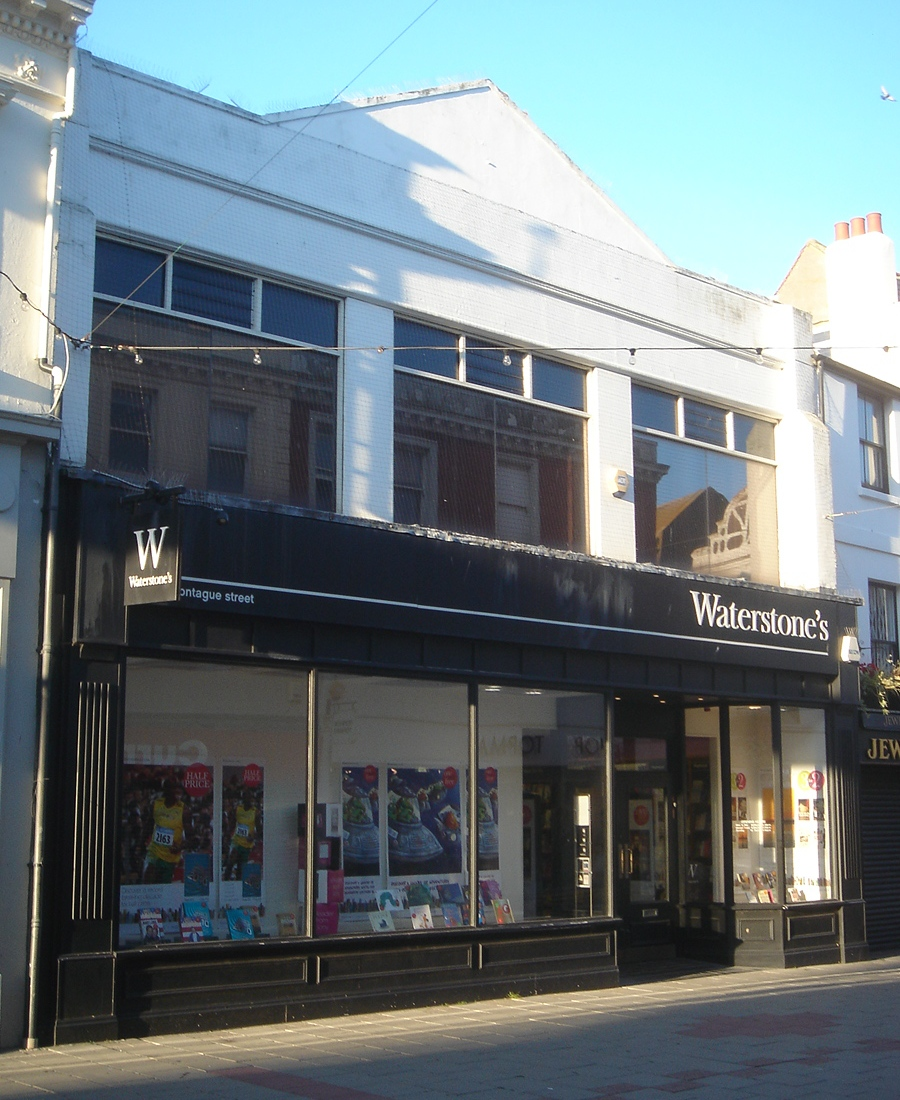
Worthing Tabernacle was founded in Montague Hall in 1895.

C. Douglas Crouch, originally from Bromley in Kent, was a pastor at Worthing Baptist Church. Crouch left the Baptist Church in 1895 and founded a new independent church—the Worthing Tabernacle—in Montague Hall. The Worthing Tabernacle was founded in Montague Hall in 1879 and moved to a new building two years later. This was the building's final religious use: in 1908, it was bought by two musician brothers who turned it into a shop and concert hall. In that year, architect James Lund was commissioned to design a new chapel for the congregation. A site on Chapel Road, near St Paul's Church, was chosen. The new building was registered for worship in 1908 in accordance with the Places of Worship Registration Act 1855, and has been used since then. Its number on the Worship Register is 43179. The chapel was registered for the solemnisation of marriages from 6 August 1908, and the Montague Street chapel's registration was simultaneously cancelled.

Worthing Tabernacle was listed at Grade II by English Heritage on 2 December 1988. As of February 2001, it was one of 198 Grade II-listed buildings, and 213 listed buildings of all grades, in the Borough of Worthing. (These totals have since changed because of new listings and delistings.)

Sunday services, meetings and other social events take place in the chapel, and groups meet for worship in private houses in the Worthing area. The Tabernacle is also associated with the Maybridge Christian Fellowship, an Evangelical church founded in 1954 in Worthing's Maybridge estate.

== Architecture ==
Worthing Tabernacle has a distinctive exterior and an imposing, elaborate interior laid out like an auditorium. James Lund combined the Gothic Revival and Romanesque Revival styles in his design, and used pale stone rubble with Bath Stone quoins and dressings on the street frontage. The side and rear walls were executed in brick, and the building has a slate roof. The façade is dominated by a large, twelve-lobed rose window which sits above a six-lancet range at first-floor level. Below this, and a thin stone course which separates the two floors, is a set of three narrow arched windows with a single window on each side. The façade is flanked by tapering buttresses which terminate in a pair of pinnacles alongside the gable end. On each side of the buttresses are identical, partly recessed wings, shorter than the main façade, with round-arched entrance doors set below small gables and paired rectangular windows. The north and south sides, of dark brick with red-brick details, also have rounded lancet windows and gables.

Inside, the "remarkable roof structure" is supported by ornate iron pillars which pierce the wooden galleries on each side and hold up the main beams. These are topped by intricately designed capitals. A partly granite chancel arch divides the interior into two bays. In the front bay, an elaborate double-deck pulpit, carved wooden galleries and pews survive from when the church was built. To the rear of the chapel, a modern organ and case have replaced the original equipment, which was apparently retrieved from Walmer Castle in Kent.

== Pastors ==
The Worthing Tabernacle Church was first pastored by C. Douglas Crouch (1896 to 1919). Crouch was followed by Pastor G.J. Attwood (1919 to 1939). Pastor Eric Land succeeded Attwood to lead the church for 28 years (1940 to 1968). In 1970 the church appointed J. A. 'Tony' Sargent from Enfield to Pastor the Church (1970 to 1998), he did so until he was called to Glasgow International Christian College in 1998. From 1999 to 2011 Mark Weeden Pastored the church and in 2013 Rich Owen became the current minister to date.

== See also ==
- List of places of worship in Worthing
- Listed buildings in Worthing
