= Thieves Kitchen =

Thieves' Kitchen
- Vintners Parrot
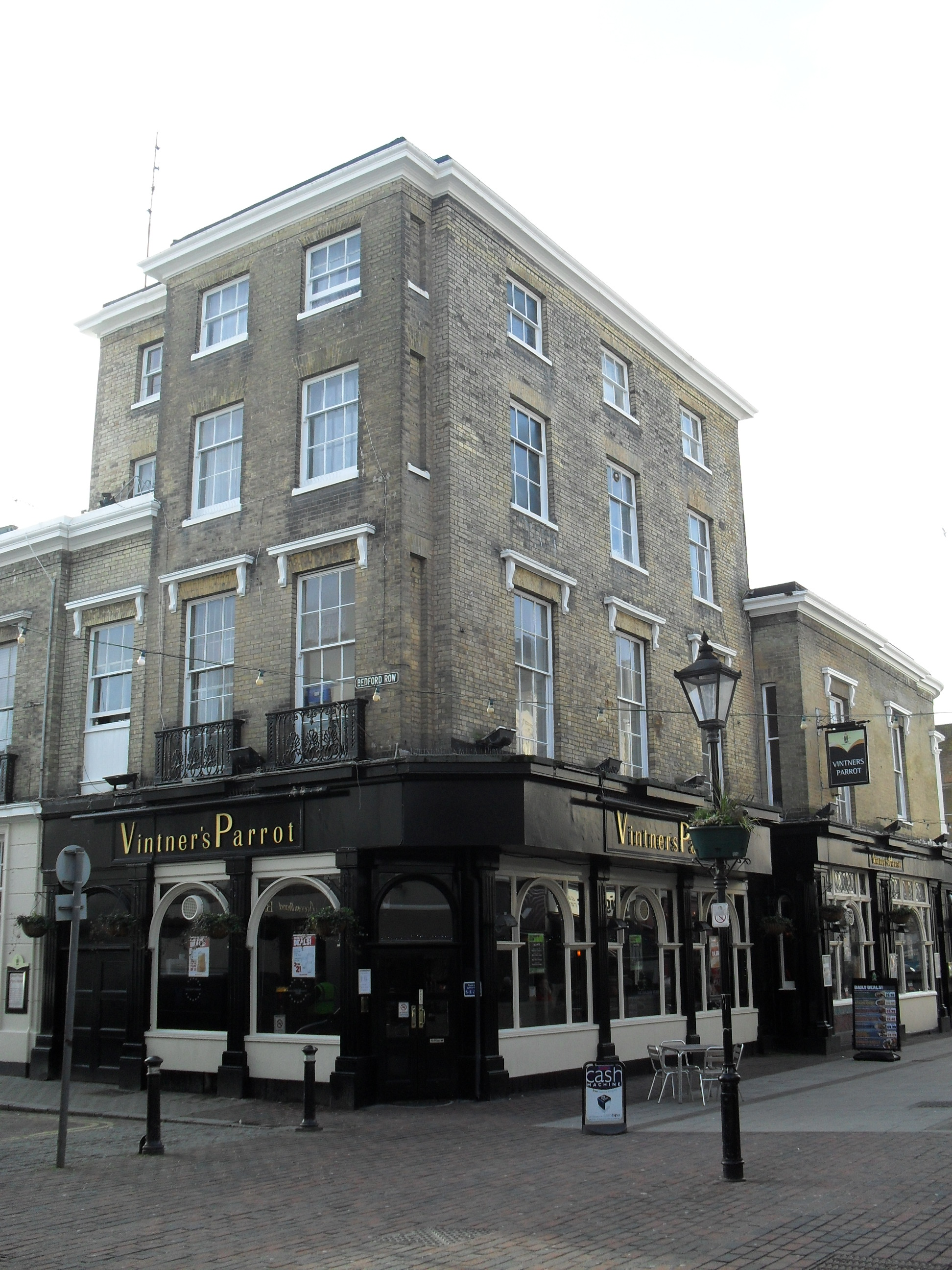
- The building from the northeast in 2010, when known as the Vintner's Parrot

- Location within West Sussex
- 50°48′42″N 0°22′09″W
- Location: 10–12 Warwick Street, Worthing, West Sussex BN11 3DL, England

History
- Built: 1830s
- Built for: Roberts & Son wine merchants

Site notes
- Architectural style: Greek Revival

Listed Building – Grade II
- Official name: Nos 10, 12, and Thieves Kitchen Public House, Warwick Street
- Designated: 21 May 1976
- Reference no.: 1250692

Bedford Hall
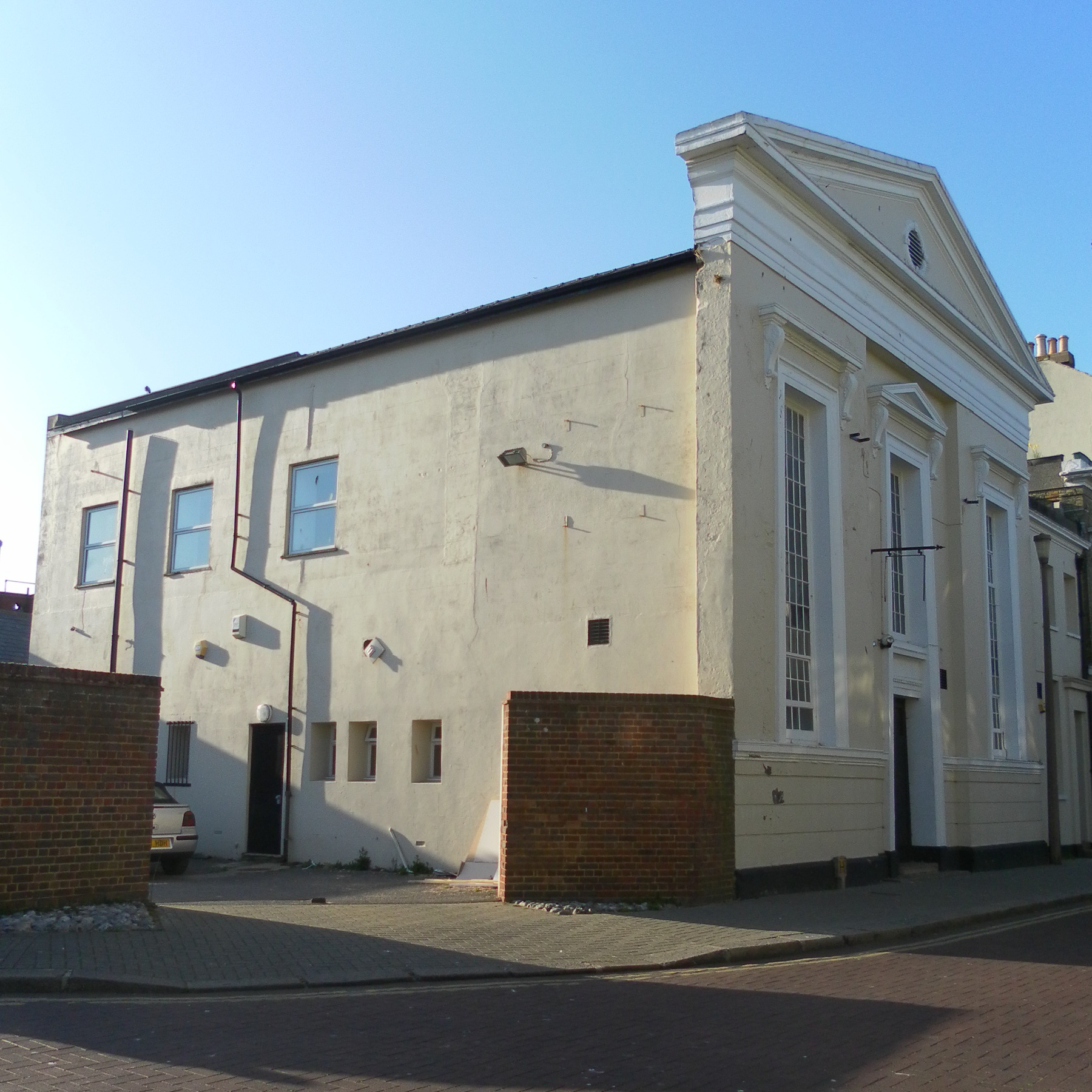
- The hall from the southeast
- Interactive map of Bedford Hall
- 50.8114°N 0.3691°W
- Location: Bedford Row, Worthing, West Sussex BN11 3DR, England

History
- Built: 1839–1840
- Built for: Wesleyan Methodists

Site notes
- Architect: Charles Hide
- Architectural style: Neoclassical/Egyptian

Listed Building – Grade II
- Official name: Bedford Hall
- Designated: 21 May 1976
- Reference no.: 1025806

The Thieves' Kitchen (formerly Vintner's Parrot and before that Thieves Kitchen) is a pub in the centre of the town and borough of Worthing, West Sussex. Established as a public house in the late 20th century, it occupies two early 19th-century listed buildings in the oldest part of the town: a Greek Revival-style former wine merchants premises, and a Neoclassical chapel built for Wesleyan Methodists in 1839. Most of the pub's main facilities are housed in the former wine merchant's building on Warwick Street. The adjoining chapel, commonly referred to as Bedford Hall and facing Bedford Row, is now used as a function room. Both buildings have been designated separately as Grade II Listed Buildings.

== Roberts and Son Wine Merchants, 10–12 Warwick Street ==
=== History ===
The Roberts family entered the wine trade five years after Worthing was granted the status of a town in 1803—a development which encouraged rapid residential and commercial growth. In 1808, they established their business in a newly built yellow-brick building on the south side of Warwick Street, part of Worthing's old village street and one of the first roads to develop in the town's early years. The premises may have been built by John Rebecca, architect of many of Worthing's early buildings.

The business thrived, and a beer and wine shop (similar to a present-day public house or wine bar) were added. This was called the Vintners Arms, but it was usually known as the Thieves Kitchen locally—a humorous reference to its popularity with local tradesmen. In the 1830s, the premises were rebuilt in the Greek Revival style, again using the pale brickwork often seen on old buildings in Worthing: the town had many brickworks in the 19th century, and the local clay yielded creamy-yellow bricks.

The Roberts family opened another wine bar and restaurant in the town in 1950, and ran it for 36 years. They owned and ran the Vintners Arms as a pub and wine bar until 1977, when they sold it to St George's Taverns Ltd, a pub chain. For a while it was renamed the Vintners Parrot but has now reverted to its popular name. Now owned by the Greene King Pub Company.

The building was designated a Grade II Listed building on 21 May 1976.

=== Architecture ===
The building presents its main façade to Warwick Street, but it also wraps around the street corner to form the top of Bedford Row, one of Worthing's oldest speculative residential developments: a terrace of bow-fronted houses built in 1803 opposite a formal lawn (since built upon). The Warwick Street elevation has five bays in two discrete parts: the eastern section (on the corner of Bedford Row) rises to four storeys and spans three bays, while the two western bays (on the corner of Marine Place) have two storeys and stand slightly forward and separate. Between the modern frontages on the ground floor and the yellowish brick walls, there is a cornice.

The windows, most of which are sashes, have various embellishments. Three sash windows on the first floor of the Bedford Row façade have iron balconies with anthemion ornamentation. Most are multi-pane windows with muntins (glazing bars), and those on the first floor have flat hood moulds. There is a larger window on the west corner, topped with a pediment.

== Bedford Hall ==
=== History ===
Bedford Hall has a complex history with multiple uses. In 1820, the Brighton Circuit of Wesleyan Methodists extended its reach to Worthing: meetings were held in a private house. Two years later, a chapel was built on Marine Place. The flint building, named Providence Chapel, was used for the next 17 years; but in 1839 Charles Hide was commissioned to design a new place of worship nearby. The Hide family (some members took the surname Hyde) was at the centre of Worthing's architectural, building and surveying industry for 150 years from 1803, when Edward and John Hide went into partnership. Edward's son Charles designed Montague Hall and Worthing's original town hall as well as the chapel.

Hide's building, in the Neoclassical style, was finished in 1840, and the congregation moved in. Additions were made in 1847 (when a first-floor gallery was built) and 1861, when a school was built on adjacent land. The congregation moved again in June 1900 when a new church (now called the Cornerstone Methodist Church) was built in Steyne Gardens. After its closure, the name Bedford Hall was adopted and it became a meeting room and auction house. When the National Provincial Bank refurbished its premises in 1967, it moved into Bedford Hall temporarily. It was later occupied by the expanded Vintners Parrot pub, which turned it into a function room.

Bedford Hall was also listed at Grade II by English Heritage on 21 May 1976.

=== Architecture ===
Hide's building is a stuccoed Neoclassical edifice with distinctive Egyptian-style tapering windows. The façade is dominated by the three windows, all wider at the bottom than the top; the left and right windows are longer and have flat architrave-style hood moulds above them, while the centre window (topped with a small pediment) terminates above the door, although the framed surround is carried down to ground level around it. The door therefore tapers from bottom to top as well. Above the windows is a cornice topped by a shallow pediment with a round window.

== See also ==
- List of places of worship in Worthing
- Listed buildings in Worthing
