= Christ Church, Worthing =

Christ Church
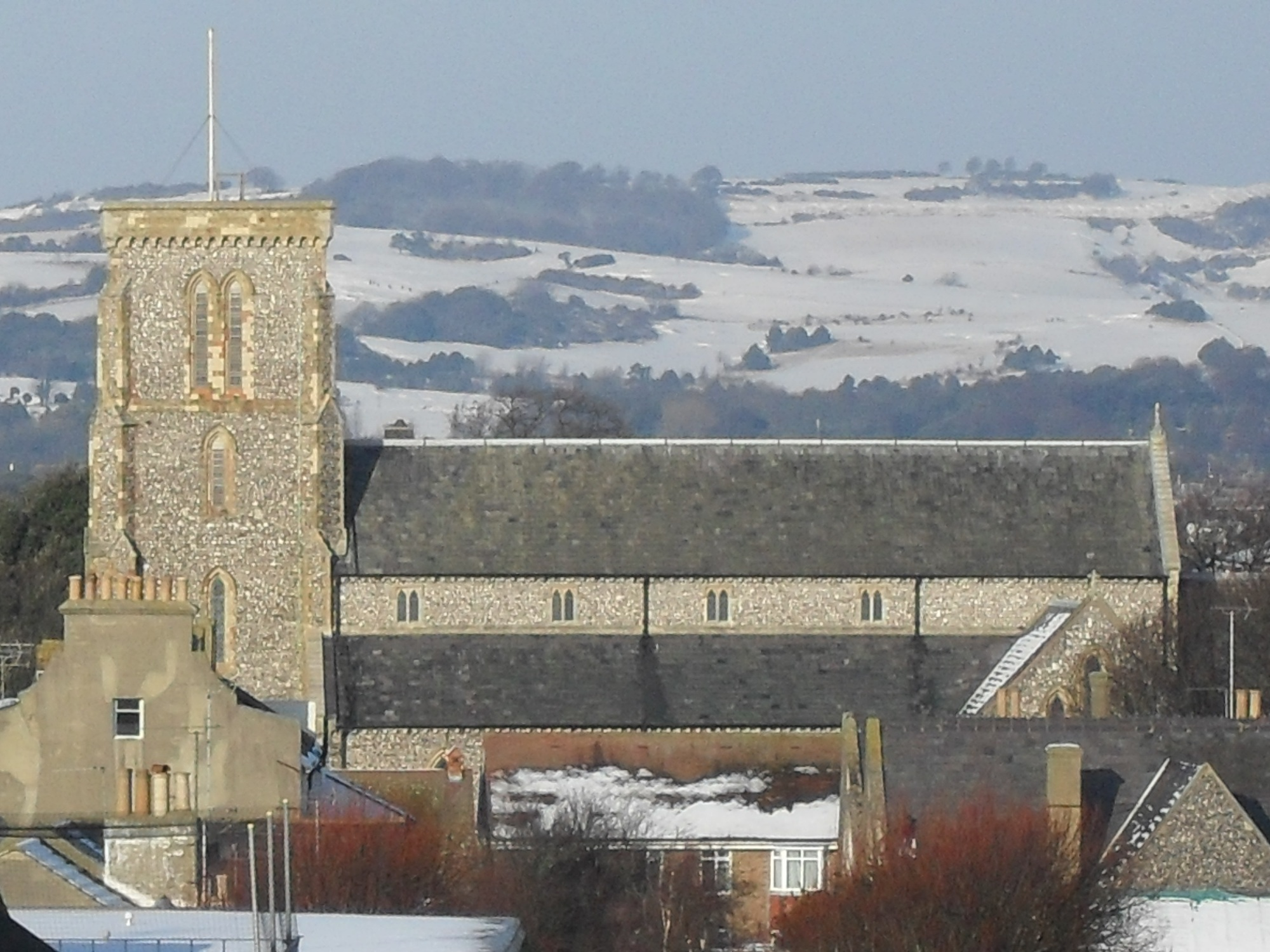
- The church seen from the south
- Christ Church
- 50.81258°N 0.37359°W
- Location: Grafton Road, Worthing, West Sussex
- Country: United Kingdom
- Denomination: Anglican
- Website: www.ChristChurchWorthing.org.uk/

History
- Founded: 1840
- Dedicated: 1843

Architecture
- Architect: John Elliott
- Style: Gothic Revival
- Years built: 1812

Administration
- Diocese: Diocese of Chichester
- Parish: Worthing, Holy Trinity with Christ Church

Christ Church and its burial grounds in Worthing, England, were consecrated in 1843 by the Bishop of Chichester, Ashurst Turner Gilbert, to meet the need for church accommodation for the poor. Built by subscription between 1840 and 1843, the Church was initially regarded as a chapel of ease to St Mary's Church in Broadwater. The chapel of ease was upgraded to the status of church with its own parish in 1855.

Christ Church is the second oldest Church of England church still standing in Worthing town centre, after St Paul's Church which stands 100 metres to the east at the opposite end of Ambrose Place. Standing at 85 feet (26 metres) tall Christ Church is one of Worthing's most dominant flint buildings.

The church was built mainly to provide church accommodation for the poor in Worthing, since the existing chapel of ease, now St Paul's Church, was funded as a proprietary chapel and so excluded the poor.

== Christ Church Schools ==
The Christ Church, National girls' and infants' schools were housed, in 1860, in a Gothic revival flint building to the south of Christ Church.

== Burial ground ==
Architect, engineer and archaeologist John Turtle Wood who lived at Marine Parade in Worthing is buried in Christ Church in the town centre. He is possibly most famous for discovering the ancient Ionian city of Ephesus.

== Miscellanea ==
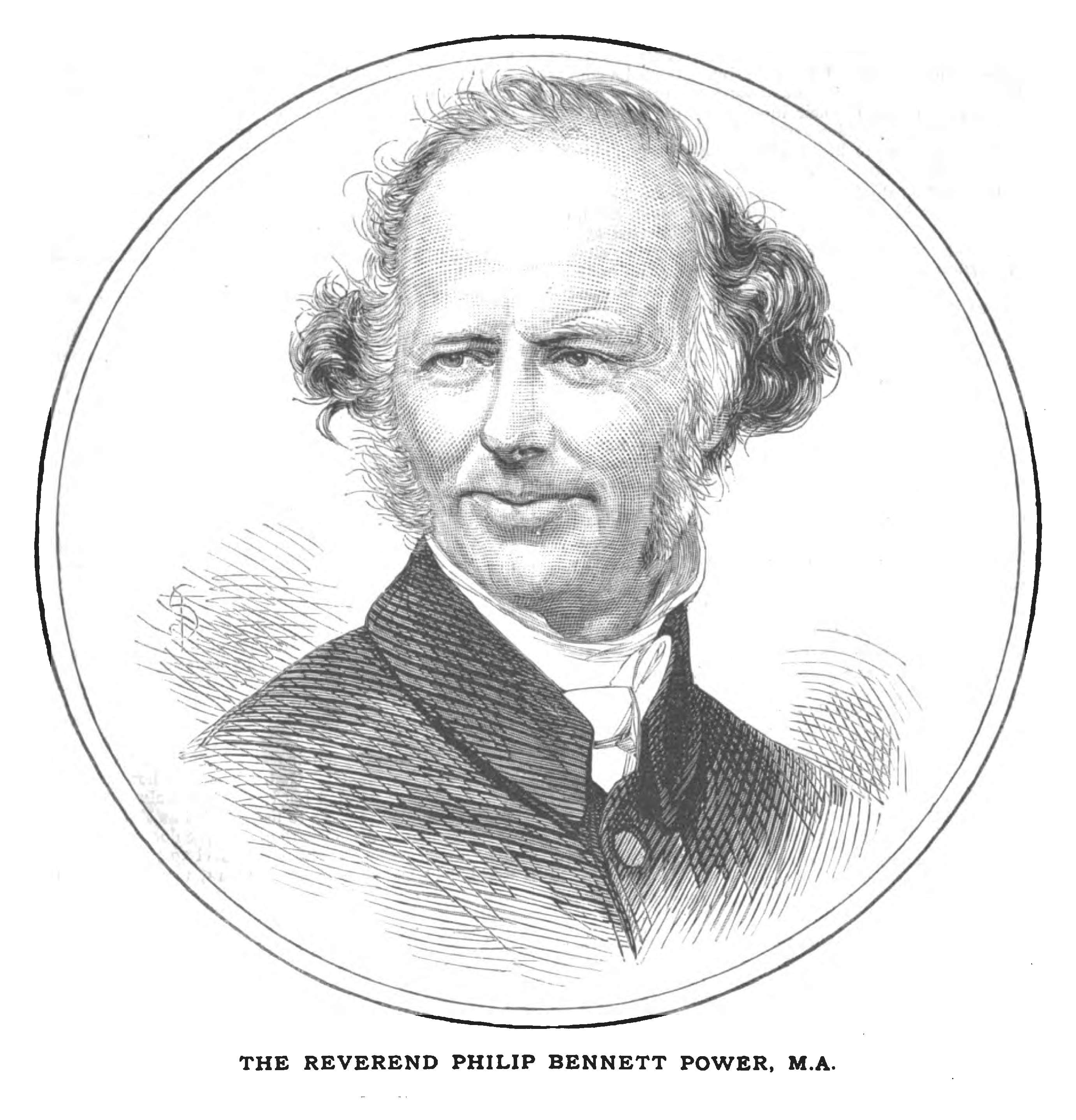
Philip Bennett Power, incumbent 1855–1865

In 1859 the incumbent founded the Workmen's Reading Room or Institute in nearby Montague Street.

The same incumbent edited the Worthing Messenger and Workmen's Friend

== Current status ==
Christ Church Worthing, formerly known as the "Parish Church of Worthing", was without an incumbent after the church was incorporated into the united benefice of Christ the King, combining the churches of Christ Church, Holy Trinity, St. Matthew and St. Paul, in 1989. Under threat of closure, in 2008 the "team ministry" was disbanded and Christ Church Worthing became part of the benefice of |Worthing Holy Trinity with Christ Church in the rural deanery of Worthing and the Archdeaconry of Chichester, including Christ Church Worthing, Holy Trinity Church and St. Pauls. The church has been given an

opportunity over the next five years in the new set-up to see if the congregation can form a fresh engagement with the town of Worthing and make good the aims that they have set themselves

— Paul Holden, Evening Argus

.

Since February 2013, Rev'd Matthew Luff has been appointed as Priest in Charge (as there is a Deanery Review currently) of the Parish of Christ Church and Holy Trinity, Worthing.

After the 2014 Palm Sunday service at Holy Trinity, all services have been held at Christ Church, Grafton Road, Worthing.

== Music ==
Under the Organist and Choir Master, Ralph Waters, Christ Church has long preserved a strong choral tradition. The organ, which was originally built by J.J.Binns of Leeds in 1892 for Baillie Street Methodist Church in Rochdale, was obtained in 1967 through Percy Daniel & Co. Ltd., who had heard of the instrument being for sale due to impending demolition of the church, and was eventually rebuilt by them, with some additions and a new console, and installed in 1970. It is sited in the south transept gallery with a detached console on the north side of the chancel

== See also ==
- List of places of worship in Worthing
