= John Turtle Wood =

English architect, engineer and archaeologist (1821–1890)

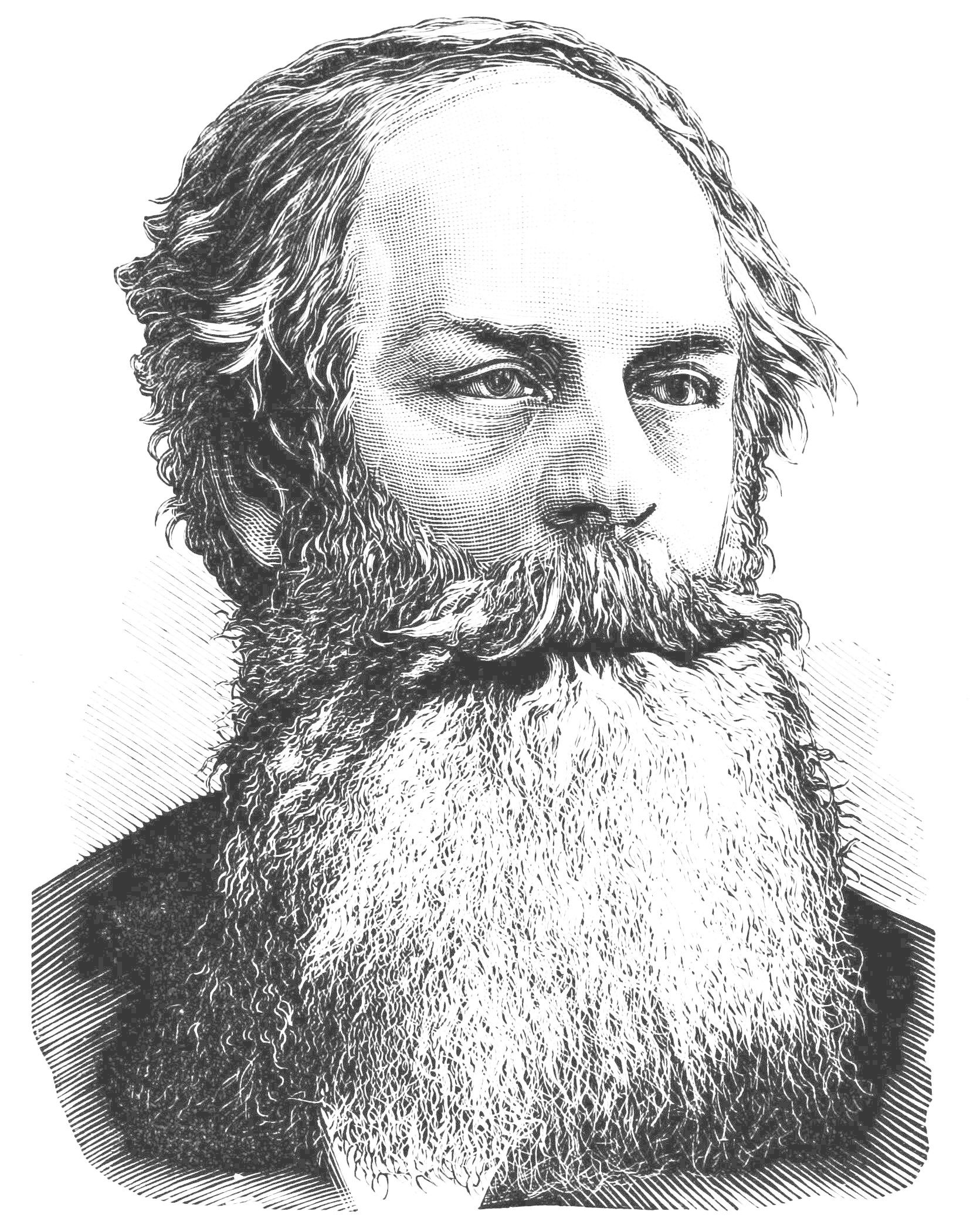
John Turtle Wood in 1875

John Turtle Wood (13 February 1821 – 25 March 1890) was an English architect, engineer and archaeologist.

== Biography ==
Wood was born at Hackney, London the son of John Wood of Shropshire and his wife Elizabeth Wood, née Turtle. He was educated at Rossall School, Fleetwood, and later studied architecture, under private tutors, at Cambridge and Venice. He practiced architecture in London from 1853 to 1858. In 1853, he married his cousin, Henrietta Elizabeth Wood.

In 1858, Wood received a commission to design railway stations for the Smyrna and Aidin Railway in Turkey. Here he became interested in the remains of the temple of Artemis (Artemision) at Ephesus, which had completely disappeared from view about 500 years previously. The Temple was important on account of its mention in the New Testament, when Paul of Tarsus was shouted down by the mob, chanting "Great is Diana of the Ephesians". (Acts 19:34)

In 1863, he relinquished his commission and began the search. The British Museum granted him a permit and a small allowance for expenses in return for the property rights in any antiquities he might discover in Ephesus.

In February 1866, while excavating in the theatre of Ephesus, Wood found a Greek inscription, which mentioned various gold and silver statuettes, which, on regular occasions, were carried from the temple, through the Magnesian gate, to the theatre. He reasoned that at the Magnesian gate, there would be found a paved road leading to the temple. In 1867, he found the road and, following its track, discovered the wall of the temple. He proceeded to excavate the site and, on 31 December 1869, discovered the temple buried beneath 20 feet of sand.

The temple was no more than wreckage, but Wood managed to recover a quantity of shattered sculptures and architectural items to be sent to the British Museum. In 1874, his health was as devastated as the debris of the temple site. He had endured fever, bandits, earthquakes, and injuries and endured summer heat and cold winters. He returned to London and spent his remaining years giving occasional lectures to the Royal Institution and publishing Discoveries at Ephesus. In his spare time he painted in oils and occasionally exhibited at the Royal Academy.

Wood was lionised as the discoverer of Ephesus. In 1874, he was elected a Fellow of the Royal Institute of British Architects, and in 1875 as a Fellow of the Society of Antiquaries. The British government awarded him a pension of £200 per annum in recognition of his discoveries.

Wood died on 25 March 1890 aged 69, at his home at 66 Marine Parade, Worthing, Sussex, and was buried at Christ Church, Worthing in Worthing.

== Sources ==
- Wood, J T (1890), Modern discoveries on the site of ancient Ephesus, By-paths of Bible knowledge, Religious Tract Society, OCLC 3009738
- Wood, J T (1877), Discoveries at Ephesus : Including the site and remains of the great temple of Diana, Longmans, Green, OCLC 5626502
