= Ian Hare =

GB international rugby league footballer

Personal information
- Full name: Ian Hare

Playing information
- Position: Wing
Club
Years	Team	Pld	T	G	FG	P
1965–69	Widnes	67	37	0	0	111
Representative
Years	Team	Pld	T	G	FG	P
1967	Great Britain	1	0	0	0	0

Ian Hare is a former professional rugby league footballer who played in the 1960s. He played at representative level for Great Britain, and at club level for Widnes, as a wing.

== Playing career ==
=== Club career ===
Hare started as a rugby union player, and represented Dorset and Wiltshire. He switched to rugby league in April 1965, signing for Widnes.

=== International honours ===
Ian Hare won a cap for Great Britain while at Widnes in 1967 against France.

== Post-playing career ==
Hare served as a councillor in the Farnworth area for 15 years.
