= St Botolph's Church, Heene =

St Botolph's Church
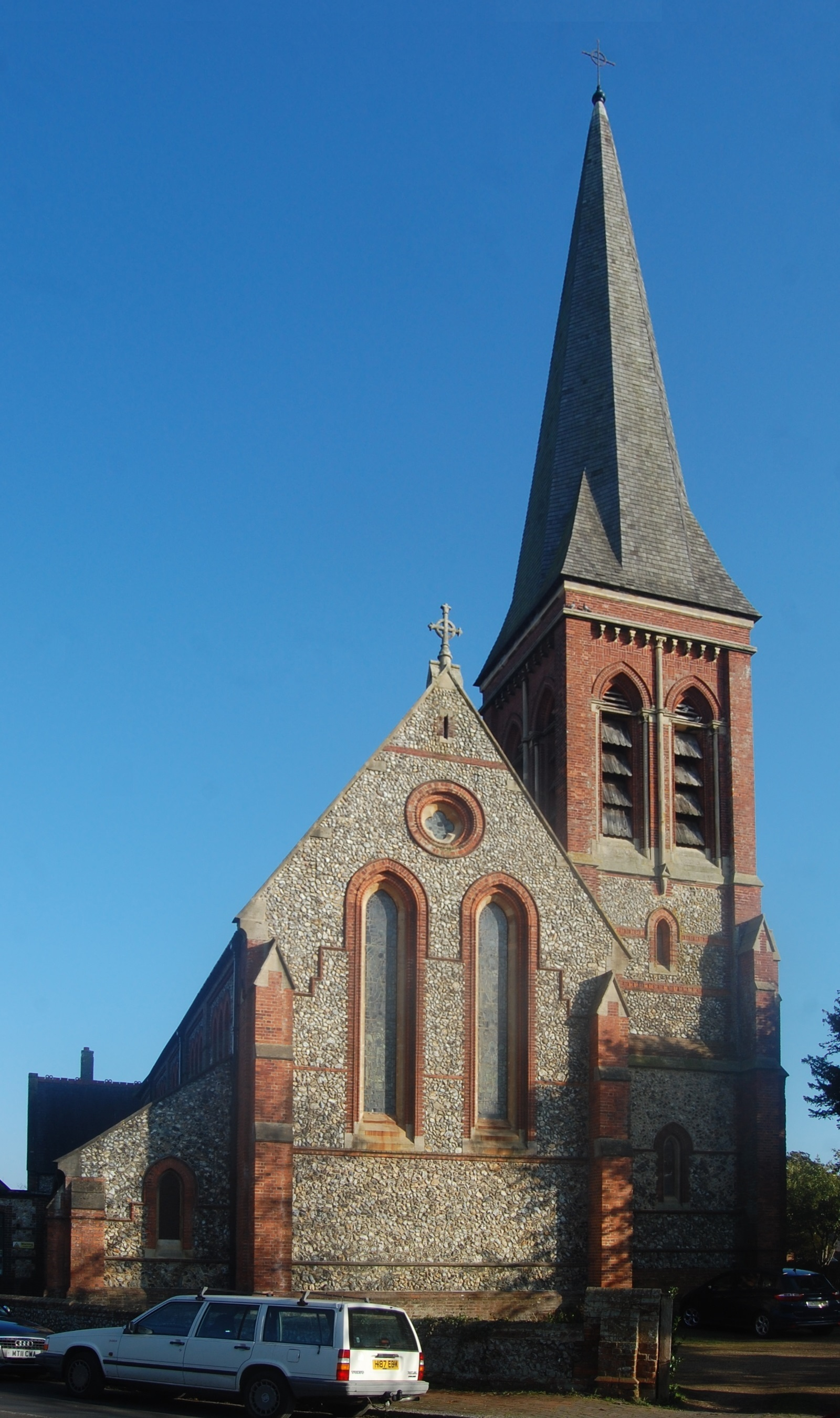
- The church in 2023
- St Botolph's Church
- 50.8136°N 0.3867°W
- Location: Lansdowne Road, Heene, Worthing, West Sussex BN11 4SG
- Country: England
- Denomination: Anglican
- Website: stbotolphsheene2015.com

History
- Status: Parish church
- Founded: 11th century (original church); 1873 (new church)
- Dedication: Saint Botolph
- Dedicated: By 1534

Architecture
- Functional status: Active
- Heritage designation: Grade II
- Designated: 21 May 1976
- Architect: Edmund Scott
- Architectural type: Early English
- Groundbreaking: 1873
- Completed: 1879
- Demolished: 1770s (original church)

Administration
- Province: Canterbury
- Diocese: Chichester
- Archdeaconry: Chichester
- Deanery: Worthing
- Parish: Heene

Clergy
- Rector: Priest-in-Charge, Revd. Peter Kane

St Botolph's Church is an Anglican church in the Heene area of the borough of Worthing in the county of West Sussex, England. It had 11th-century origins as a chapelry within the parish of West Tarring, but declined and fell into disuse by the 18th century. Neighbouring Worthing's rapid development as a seaside resort in the 19th century encouraged residential growth around the ancient village of Heene, and a new church with the same dedication was built to serve both Heene and the high-class planned estate of West Worthing. Edmund Scott's Early English Gothic-style church (listed at Grade C) stands next to the fragmentary ruins of the old church, which are listed separately at Grade II.

== History ==
Heene developed in Saxon times as a coastal hamlet 1 mile (1.6 km) west of Worthing. At the time of the Domesday survey in 1086, it had two estates held by William de Braose, 1st Lord of Bramber—a Norman nobleman who owned much land in the area and founded several churches.

A church is known to have existed at Heene in the 11th century, but its location is unknown. The coast was subject to frequent erosion, and it may have been destroyed by the sea. A new structure was built in the 13th century. It was a chapelry of nearby West Tarring rather than a parish church in its own right, and was sometimes described as the "second church" or chapel at West Tarring (the main church was St Andrew's, which was also founded in the 11th century). By the Middle Ages, all tithes accrued in Heene were paid to West Tarring, and all ecclesiastical administrative functions were carried out by St Andrew's Church. Also, the advowson of St Botolph's Church was held by the Archbishop of Canterbury, reflecting the status of St Andrew's as a peculier of Canterbury.

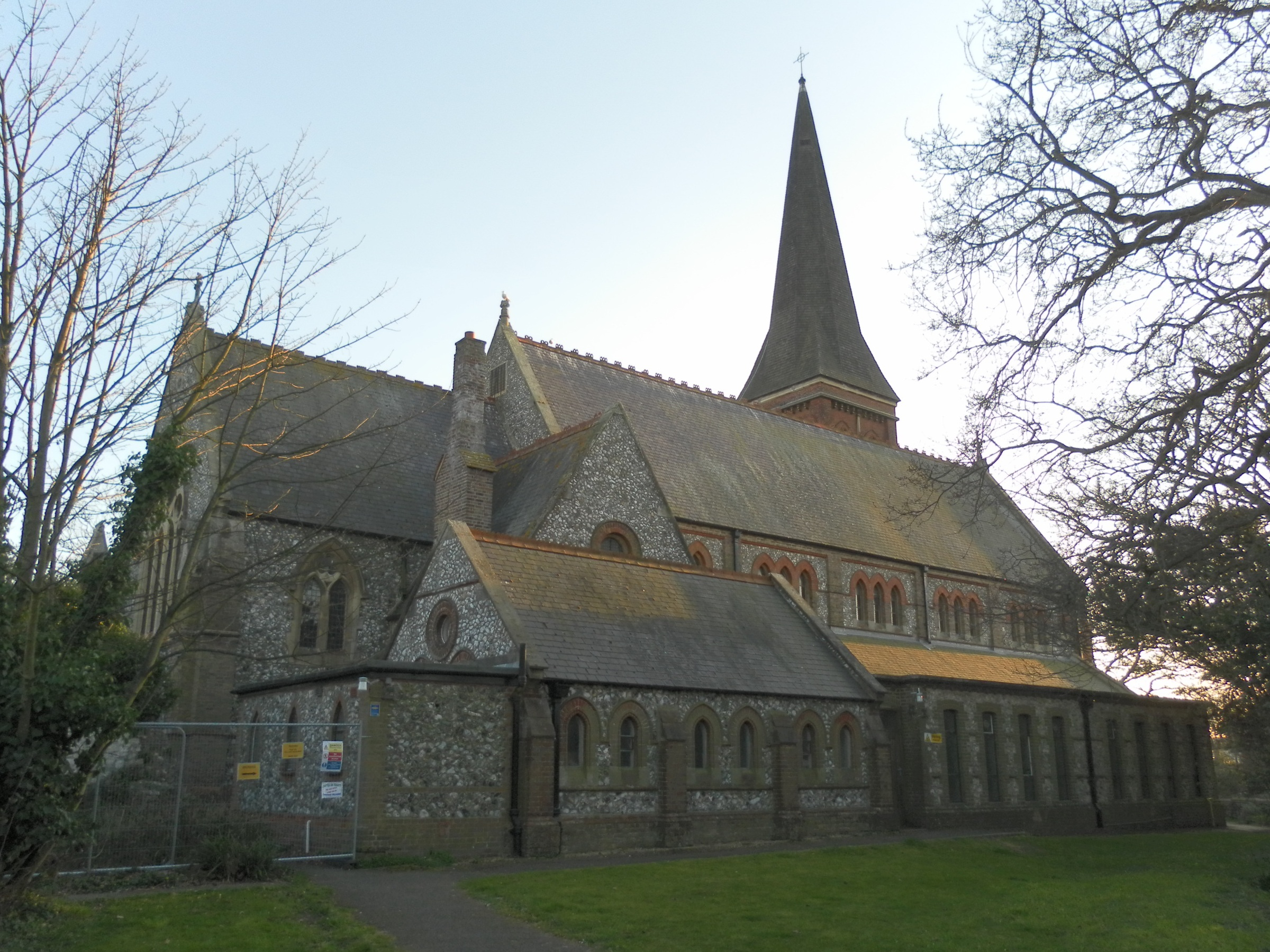
The church seen from Manor Road

The fortunes of St Botolph's Church first declined in the 17th century. The population had never been large—14 inhabitants were recorded in 1086, and 32 in 1524—and the Black Death killed many villagers in the 14th century. In the early 17th century, the lords of the two manors at Heene enforced the enclosure of the area's common land and evicted many of the remaining residents. With few worshippers using it, the remaining parishioners called for its closure and demolition in 1622, in favour of attending St Andrew's. Between 1660 and 1680, St Botolph's fell into disrepair, and 1680 permission was granted for residents to worship at St Andrew's instead. The 13th-century structure, which had a chancel, nave and steeple, was entirely ruined by 1766—by which time no services had been held for about 80 years—and permission was given for most of the masonry to be removed from the site and used for the upkeep of St Andrew's Church. The chancel disappeared by 1770, and in 1778 only a fragment of the nave wall still stood. A font from the 14th century remained as well.

Heene was reinvigorated by the rapid growth of neighbouring Worthing in the early 19th century, helped by the granting of town status in 1803. By 1839, a small planned resort-style development ("Little Heene") had been made, and houses extended along the road towards Worthing by 1850. In 1863, a real estate development company, the Heene Estate Land Company, acquired most of the 426 acres (172 ha) of the parish (which had become a separate civil parish in the 16th century, although the ecclesiastical parish was still part of West Tarring). Within two years, town commissioners had been appointed and a speculative housing estate and seaside resort was being built. Development was very rapid, and the "new town" of West Worthing was soon nearly complete. It required a church, though, so in 1873 the company donated land next to the ruined St Botolph's Church to allow a new building to be erected.

Edmund E. Scott was commissioned to design the new church. The Brighton-based architect was best known for St Bartholomew's Church in his home town, and also designed St Cosmas and St Damian Church, Keymer and an extension to the Church of the Annunciation in Brighton. He built a nave with aisles on the north and south sides, a chancel, a single transept and a tower and spire at the west end (added in 1879), As West Worthing developed into a fashionable, high-class residential area, more room was required; between 1903 and 1905, R.S. Hyde extended the south aisle and transept. In 1982, the north aisle was also extended and given a new entrance.

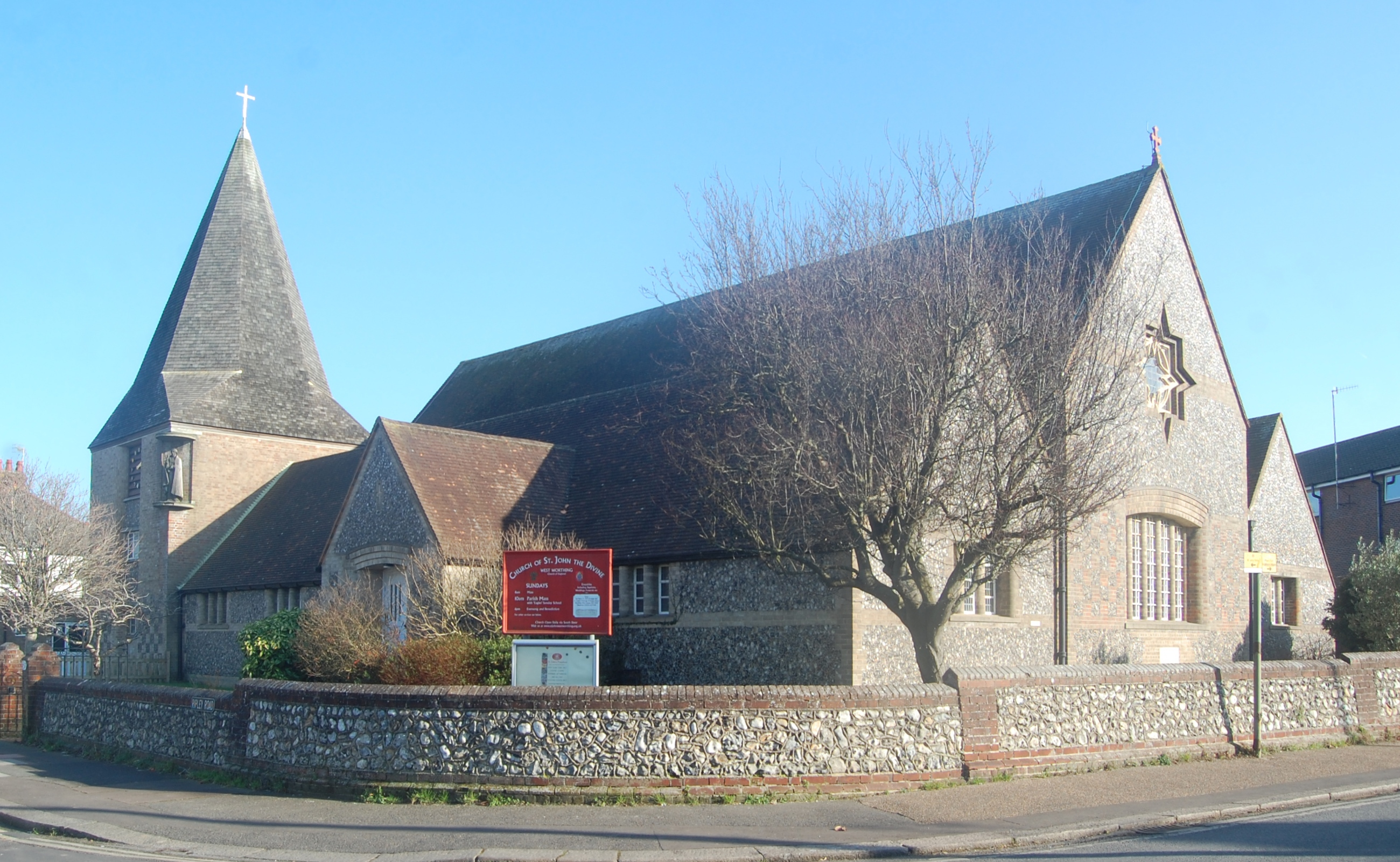
St John the Divine Church was originally a mission chapel of St Botolph's.

A parish was formed for the church in 1875, and the building was completed in 1879 with the construction of the tower and the hanging of eight bells cast by the firm of John Warner and Sons. In the same year, a temporary church hall was built nearby; it was replaced by a brick structure in 1898. The "High church" form of Anglo-Catholic worship, which had caused considerable controversy at St Andrew's Church in central Worthing upon its introduction there in the 1880s, also became established at St Botolph's, this time without any apparent dispute. It is of interest that at the Consecration of this Church the senior church-warden, H.H. Harwood, commented specifically on the type of worship expected in the new building: 'There is no question that it is to be a "high" church . . . my own views are by no means extreme - indeed, I prefer the middle aisle to either the steeple or the crypt . . . I am not disposed to object to a choral, and certainly not a daily service. I think that those persons who desire to obtain grace from the Throne of Grace daily, and to withdraw for a brief period from the . . . world, have a perfect right to be considered . . ' As a result of these aspirations St Botolph's began to provide a type of service somewhat different from that found in other churches in the Worthing area.

In 1900, the church extended its reach by establishing a mission hall in the newly developed Ripley Road area of West Worthing. This chapel was completed in 1901 and was dedicated to St John (of Patmos). St Botolph's administered it until 1937, when it was rebuilt and reincorporated as a separate church in its own right, under the name of St John the Divine (an alternative honorific for John of Patmos). It was given a parish in 1955 out of territory taken from St Botolph's and St Andrew's parishes, and the building was extended in 1965.

The advowson was still held by the Archbishop of Canterbury until 1930, despite the church's independence from St Andrew's at West Tarring. In that year, it passed to the Diocese of Chichester. The rectory next to the church was rebuilt between 1958 and 1959 by the firm of Denman and Sons.

== Architecture ==
As originally built by Scott, St Botolph's Church had an aisled nave, chancel, south transept and tower with a broach spire. The Early English-style building was executed in flint and red brick with dressings of stone. The work carried out by R.S. Hyde between 1903 and 1905 added no new structural elements; the transept and south aisle were merely extended in the same style. The roofs, including the separate roofline of the large south aisle, are tiled with slates. The interior is of red and pale brown brick with some contrasting brown and grey stonework. Its fittings include an altar designed by William H.R. Blacking in 1935. There is stained glass by various designers dating from the 1880s to the 1970s.

== The church today ==
St Botolph's Church was listed at Grade C by on 21 May 1976. Grade C was the lowest rank on an old grading system used for Anglican churches, before English Heritage extended the standard Grade I, II* and II scheme to all types of building. A small number of churches remain on the old scheme, on which Grade C is equivalent to Grade II.

The meagre remains of the ruined 13th-century church are still visible in the grounds east of the present church. English Heritage, which listed the ruins at Grade II on the same date as the church itself was listed, noted that they were "somewhat scanty" and "much weathered".

The parish of St Botolph's covers an area at the southern part of Worthing borough with only about 7,000 people living within the boundary, which is defined by the railway line to the north, Shakespeare and Wordsworth Roads in the east, the English Channel coast in the south and Grand Avenue in the west.

== See also ==
- List of places of worship in Worthing
- Listed buildings in Worthing

== Bibliography ==
- Antram, Nicholas; Morrice, Richard (2008). Brighton and Hove. Pevsner Architectural Guides. London: Yale University Press. ISBN 978-0-300-12661-7.
- Elleray, D. Robert (1977a). Worthing: a Pictorial History. Chichester: Phillimore & Co. ISBN 0-85033-263-X.
- Elleray, D. Robert (1985). Worthing: Aspects of Change. Chichester: Phillimore & Co. ISBN 0-85033-551-5.
- Elleray, D. Robert (1998). A Millennium Encyclopaedia of Worthing History. Worthing: Optimus Books. ISBN 0-9533132-0-4.
- Elleray, D. Robert (2004). Sussex Places of Worship. Worthing: Optimus Books. ISBN 0-9533132-7-1.
- Hare, Chris (1991). Historic Worthing: The Untold Story. Adlestrop: The Windrush Press. ISBN 0-900075-91-0.
- Nairn, Ian; Pevsner, Nikolaus (1965). The Buildings of England: Sussex. Harmondsworth: Penguin Books. ISBN 0-14-071028-0.
- Vincent, Alex (2005). The Lost Churches and Chapels of Sussex. Seaford: S.B. Publications. ISBN 1-85770-303-0.
- Elleray, D. Robert (1977b). St Andrew's Church Worthing, A History and Description. Worthing: Gadds Printing Works Ltd.
