= John Rebecca =

John Biagio Rebecca (1772–1847) was an architect of many buildings in Sussex and London.

Rebecca was born in Saffron Walden, Essex, the illegitimate son of Italian-born decorative painter Biagio Rebecca (1735–1808). Rebecca had property in London's Leicester Square from 1825 to 1827, but many of his buildings were built in the seaside town of Worthing in Sussex and he is credited as being the town's principal Georgian architect.

In Worthing, Rebecca designed St. Paul's Chapel of Ease (now St. Paul's Church), Beach House and 19-20 Marine Parade, which housed Stafford's Marine Library in the 19th century. 19 Marine Parade was known as Rebecca House as it was believed that the architect himself stayed in the building. Rebecca was also the architect of Worthing's Royal Baths (now demolished) and several other buildings around the town. The Royal Sea House in Worthing, later the Royal Hotel, with Ionic columns and pilasters was rebuilt to Rebecca's designs in 1829 (and destroyed by fire in 1901).

Rebecca designed Castle Goring at Goring-by-Sea for Sir Bysshe Shelley, 1st Baronet. Howard Colvin called the house "an extraordinary fantasy, suavely neo-classical on one side and romantically castellated on the other". Around 1813–16 Rebecca designed the facade of Knebworth House, Hertfordshire, for Mrs Bulwer-Lytton. Also in the 1820s he restored Penshurst Place, Kent, in Tudor Gothic style, and it was probably to Rebecca's designs that Sir John Shelley Sidney rebuilt the Sidney Chapel.

Around 1820, Buckingham House (originally 'Buckinghams' or 'Buckingham Place') in Shoreham-by-Sea in West Sussex was rebuilt to John Rebecca's designs. Its grounds are now Buckingham Park, but the house itself lies in ruins.

The Old Rectory at the village of Crowell, Oxfordshire was designed by Rebecca and built in 1822.

== Sources and further reading ==
- Colvin, H.M. (1997) [1954]. A Biographical Dictionary of British Architects, 1600-1840. New Haven: Yale University Press. ISBN 0-300-07207-4.
- Colvin, Howard (2008). A Biographical Dictionary of British Architects, 1600-1840. Yale University Press. ISBN 978-0-300-12508-5.
- Elleray, D. Robert (1998). Millennium Encyclopaedia of Worthing History. Worthing: Optimus Books. ISBN 0-9533132-0-4.
- Baggs, A.P.; Currie, C.R.J.; Elrington, C.R.; Keeling, S.M.; Rowland, A.M. (1980). "Worthing". In Hudson, T.P. (ed.). A History of the County of Sussex. Victoria County History. Vol. 6 Part 1: Bramber Rape (Southern Part). pp. 105–108.
- Baggs, A.P.; Currie, C.R.J.; Elrington, C.R.; Keeling, S.M.; Rowland, A.M. (1980). "Old and New Shoreham". In Hudson, T.P. (ed.). A History of the County of Sussex. Victoria County History. Vol. 6 Part 1: Bramber Rape (Southern Part). pp. 149–154.
- Lobel, Mary D, ed. (1964). A History of the County of Oxford: Volume 8: Lewknor and Pyrton Hundreds. Victoria County History. pp. 80–91.
- Nairn, Ian; Pevsner, Nikolaus (1965). Sussex. The Buildings of England. Harmondsworth: Penguin Books. pp. 37, 38, 287, 386, 388. ISBN 0-14-071028-0.
- Sheppard, F.H.W, ed. (1966). St Anne Soho. Survey of London. Vol. 33, 34. pp. 507–514.
- Sherwood, Jennifer; Pevsner, Nikolaus (1974). Oxfordshire. The Buildings of England. Harmondsworth: Penguin Books. p. 561. ISBN 0-14-071045-0.
