= St Paul's Church, Worthing =

The Venue (formerly St Paul's Church)
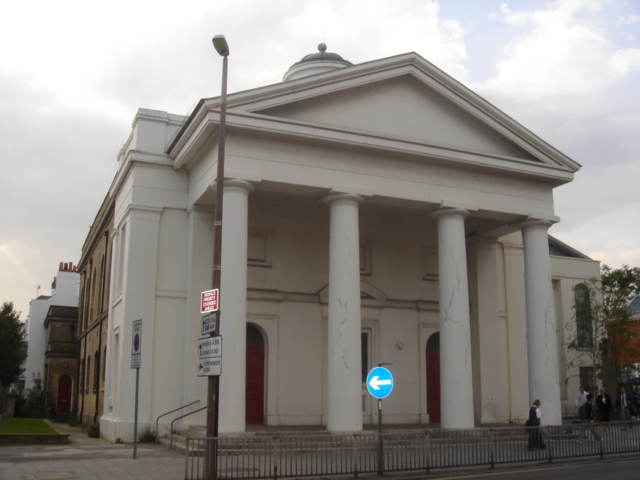
- The Venue (formerly St Paul's Church)
- 50.8137°N 0.3713°W
- Location: Chapel Road, Worthing, West Sussex, BN11 1HA
- Country: United Kingdom
- Denomination: Anglican
- Website: https://the-venue.uk/

History
- Founded: 1812
- Dedicated: 18 September 1812

Architecture
- Architect: John Rebecca
- Style: Greek Revival
- Years built: 1812
- Closed: 1996

Administration
- Diocese: Diocese of Chichester
- Parish: Worthing, Holy Trinity with Christ Church

The Venue (formerly St Paul's Church) in Worthing, England hosts live music events. It was opened in 1812 as the Worthing Chapel of Ease. It was built so that the residents and visitors to the newly created town of Worthing would not need to travel to the parish church of St Mary in Broadwater. As a growing resort, it was felt that for the town to prosper, residents and visitors would demand a local church or chapel.

The Chapel of Ease gave its name to Worthing town centre's principal north–south route, Chapel Road. The Reverend William Davison was appointed the chapel's first chaplain. The Reverend Davison went on to set up schools for boys, girls and infants in the town with money raised from the congregation. The girls' school he established was the original Davison High School.

The building of the chapel was funded by the sale and leasing of pews, making the chapel a proprietary chapel. This policy effectively excluded the poor from the church, which was criticised until 1893 when funds allowed for the building to be extended and the chapel was upgraded to parish church status and dedicated to St Paul.

Designed by John Rebecca and built by Ambrose Cartwright, who also built nearby Ambrose Place, the building has a Doric portico with four columns facing Chapel Road, with a bell cupola behind it. The building's yellow bricks are made from the blue clay taken from Worthing Common (also known as the Saltgrass), the green space which in the 19th century existed south of the current beach and is now underwater. The building is partly stuccoed.

The interior of the church was finished by a Worthing man, Edward Hide. Queen Charlotte presented the church with the royal coat of arms in thanks to the people of Worthing for showing such generosity and kindness to her daughters Princesses Amelia and Charlotte when they stayed in the town. The organ was given to the church by Edward Ogle, nicknamed "King Ogle" by Worthing residents on account of his autocratic behaviour. Originally the chancel was at the east end of the building, however when the church was extended in the 1890s, the chancel had to be moved to the west of the building, which is unusual in Anglican churches.

== Current status ==
The building was closed in 1996 due to an unsafe roof. Grade II* listed, the church is still recognised as an important asset to the town of Worthing. It has been turned into a cafe and community venue for weddings, concerts etc. and adjacent assisted accommodation.

It re-opened in 2012 under the Leadership of the "3 Pillars" management group, Fleur Penny, Charlie Norden and Steve Hamblin, as a cafe and art centre, it is the current jewel of Worthing.
