= Timeline of Worthing =

The following is a timeline of the history of the borough of Worthing, West Sussex, England.

== 13th century ==
- 1218 - By 1218 the manor of Ordinges had become known as Wurddingg.
- c.1245 - St Richard of Chichester, Sussex's patron saint, lives in Tarring at the house of Simon, parish priest of Tarring
- 1291 - Worthing's medieval chapel is mentioned for the first time

== 14th century ==
- 1300 - Worthing harbour first recorded
- 1324 - Worthing harbour is recorded as being a member of Shoreham Port

== 15th century ==
- 1410 - Worthing's medieval chapel is recorded as being used for mass

== 16th century ==
- 1539 - Worthing becomes the property of Anthony Browne, 1st Viscount Montagu
- 1575 - Worthing chapel is recorded as being in private ownership
- 1584 - John Selden, jurist, legal antiquary and oriental scholar was born in Salvington

== 17th century ==
- 1643 - St Symphorian's Church, Durrington is partly destroyed by Parliamentarian parishioners
- 1644 - The Spanish warship the Santiago (St James), is beached at Heene.
- 1682 - William Penn, founder of Pennsylvania sails across the Atlantic for the first time. His ship, the Welcome lands at Worthing to pick up at least 16 people from Sussex as it sails from the Kent port of Deal to New Castle, Delaware
- 1684 - William Penn lands in Worthing on his way from the Province of Pennsylvania to his home in Warminghurst

== 18th century ==
- 1750 - High Salvington Windmill is built
- 1759 - John Luther builds a large lodging house at the south end of High Street
- 1773 - There is said to be a 'great fishery' at Worthing
- 1789 - George Greville, 4th Earl of Warwick buys Luther's house, renaming it Warwick House
- 1797 - Castle Goring is built
- 1798 - Princess Amelia visits Worthing

== 19th century ==
- 1801 - Population: 2,151
- 1802
  - A new toll road is constructed from Worthing to West Grinstead. Teville Gate tollgate is built where the new road crosses the Teville Stream
  - Thomas Trotter opens a barn theatre in High Street
- 1803
  - Worthing is given town status and Timothy Shelley chairs the first meeting of the Worthing Town Commissioners at the Nelson Inn on South Street
  - Worthing's population approximately 2,500
- 1805 - Jane Austen visits Worthing
- 1807
  - Princess Charlotte visits Worthing
  - New Theatre (later Theatre Royal) opens on Ann Street
- 1810 - Charles and William Phillips publish Percy Bysshe Shelley's first published volume of poetry, Original Poetry by Victor and Cazire
- 1811 - Charles and William Phillips publish Percy Bysshe Shelley's The Necessity of Atheism
- 1812 - St Paul's chapel of ease opens
- 1814
  - Thomas Young makes "a number of original and insightful innovations" in deciphering Egyptian hieroglyphs on the Rosetta Stone
  - Queen Caroline visits Worthing on her way to Brunswick
- 1815 - Two infants' schools open
- 1817 - Jane Austen begins work on Sanditon, the unfinished novel based significantly on her time in Worthing
- 1820 - Beach House is built
- 1823
  - The Teville Gate tollgate is removed following protests
  - A large oyster bed is discovered 3–4 miles south-south-west of Worthing and is fished by Worthing and Brighton fishermen
- 1829 - Princess Augusta visits Worthing
- 1830 - Protesters in Broadwater demand a tithe reduction and a crowd of 200 people gather in Worthing town centre in Swing protests
- 1832 - Excise officers open fire on Worthing's last smuggling gang, shooting William Cowerson dead
- 1833 - Park Crescent is completed to designs by Amon Henry Wilds
- 1834 - Christ Church is opened
- 1835 - Worthing's first Town Hall opens
- 1838 - The Worthing Institution or Mechanics Institution is founded on Marine Parade to provide cheap information about literature, science and art
- 1845 - Railway is extended from Shoreham to Worthing
- 1849 - First recorded Worthing Regatta
- 1850 - 11 local fishermen drown as they set out to save the crew of the Lalla Rookh
- 1855 - Worthing Cricket Club is formed
- 1856 - Worthing Intelligencer newspaper first published
- 1861
  - Queen Marie Amelie of France stays in Worthing when in exile from France
  - The Sussex Coast Mercury (later the Worthing Mercury) newspaper is first published
- 1862
  - Worthing Pier opens
  - C.A. Elliott uses glass from the Great Exhibition of 1851 for glass-houses to grow grapes for sale
- 1863 - Worthing Express newspaper, a local version of the Sussex Express is first published
- 1864 - St Mary of the Angels, Worthing opens as Worthing's first post-reformation Catholic church
- 1867 - Augustus Lane-Fox excavates part of Cissbury Ring
- 1881 - Worthing Hospital is opened as Worthing Infirmary
- 1884 - Skeleton Army riots
- 1886
  - The church of St Andrew the Apostle with the 'Worthing madonna' opens to some controversy
  - Worthing F.C. is formed
- 1890
  - Worthing receives a royal charter and becomes a borough
  - Alfred Cortis is elected as Worthing's first mayor
  - The Worthing School of Art and Science is founded
- 1892 - A permanent soup kitchen and distribution centre for coal, soup and bread is established in Grafton Road
- 1893 - An outbreak of typhoid fever causes 200 fatalities
- 1894 - Oscar Wilde stays at Worthing and writes The Importance of Being Earnest
- 1896 - The first moving picture show in Worthing is shown at Worthing Pier
- 1898 - William Kennedy Dickson makes a film of a water polo game involving Worthing Swimming Club, one of the earliest films of a sports team
- 1899 - Worthing is described as "a town of hot houses" with so many hot houses established for market gardening

== 20th century ==
- 1902 - The borough of Worthing is extended to include parts of Broadwater and West Tarring
- 1908
  - Worthing Museum and Art Gallery opens
  - King Edward VII stays at Beach House for the first time
  - Worthing's first fire station is built on High Street
- 1909 - Sir Frederick Stern purchases a site on Highdown Hill that becomes Highdown Gardens
- 1910 - Ellen Chapman is elected to Worthing Council, one of the first female councillors in the UK
- 1911 - Carl Adolf Seebold opens the Dome Cinema as the Kursaal
- 1914 - The Connaught Theatre opens, initially as the Picturedrome cinema
- 1920 - Worthing Herald newspaper first published
- 1924 - The first Worthing Tramocars service runs along the town's seafront
- 1926 - The Worthing Symphony Orchestra is founded
- 1929
  - The borough of Worthing is extended to include Goring-by-Sea and Durrington
  - Vaughan Cornish and the Campaign for the Protection of Rural England submit a memorandum to the Prime Minister urging the case for national parks including on the South Downs between the rivers Arun and Adur
- 1930 - Charles Bentinck Budd is elected to the town council
- 1931 - Population: 45,905
- 1933
  - The borough of Worthing is extended to include the west of Sompting and the south of Findon
  - Worthing Rural District is created as the local authority for places surrounding Worthing
  - Worthing Corporation begins the purchase of 1000 acres of open downland as part of the Worthing Downland Estate
  - Worthing's New Town Hall opens
- 1934 - The Battle of South Street takes place between Fascists and anti-fascists
- 1936
  - Emperor Haile Selassie and his family spend six weeks in Worthing following Italy's invasion of Abyssinia
  - Brighton, Hove and Worthing Municipal Airport (now Brighton City Airport) is officially opened
- 1939 - Population: 55,584
- 1942 - Canadian soldiers based in Worthing take part in the Dieppe Raid
- 1944 - The British Army's 4th Armoured Brigade set up headquarters in the Eardley Hotel
- 1945 - Sir Otho Prior-Palmer becomes Worthing's first Member of Parliament
- 1948 - Post-war housing planned by Charles Cowles-Voysey is built using Prisoner of War labour
- 1951 - Population: 67,305
- 1960 - Beecham factory (now GSK plc) opens in Broadwater
- 1961 - Population: 77,155
- 1964
  - Sir Terence Higgins becomes the second person to represent Worthing as its Member of Parliament
  - Harold Pinter writes The Homecoming at his home in Ambrose Place
- 1966
  - Worthing's Old Town Hall is demolished
  - Sussex Downs Area of Outstanding Natural Beauty is designated
- 1969
  - Worthing hosts the opening stage of cycling's Milk Race (now the Tour of Britain)
  - Hill Barn Golf Club hosts the Penfold Tournament, part of the European Tour, for the first time
- 1970 - Phun City music festival is held in fields outside of Worthing
- 1971 - Population: 88,467
- 1972 - Worthing hosts its first World Bowls Championship
- 1974
  - Worthing Council is reformatted as Worthing Borough Council
  - Worthing College formed as Worthing Sixth Form College
- 1976 - Worthing Borough Council is led by the Conservative Party for the first time
- 1981
  - Population: 90,686
  - The West Worthing Tennis Club (relocated from West Worthing to Titnore Lane) hosts the 1981 ATP Challenger Series tennis tournament
- 1987 - Gary Bevans begins work creating a replica of the ceiling of the Sistine Chapel in Rome at English Martyrs' Catholic Church, Goring-by-Sea
- 1988 - Alan Martin and Jamie Hewlett create the character Tank Girl while at college in Worthing
- 1990 - Sterns Nightclub opens
- 1991 - Population: 98,066
- 1992 - Turning Tides homeless charity formed (initially as Worthing Churches Homeless Projects)
- 1993 - Worthing Bears win the British Basketball League
- 1994
  - Worthing Borough Council is led by the Liberal Democrats for the first time
  - Premises on Ivy Arch Road are purchased and developed into Worthing's first mosque, the Masjid Assalam
- 1997 - Two new constituencies are created - East Worthing and Shoreham (won by Tim Loughton) and Worthing West (won by Sir Peter Bottomley)
- 1999
  - Control of Worthing Borough Council returns to the Conservative Party
  - Worthing Thunder Basketball Club is formed, initially as the Worthing Rebels

== 21st century ==
- 2001 - Population: 97,540
- 2002 - Control of Worthing Borough Council returns to the Liberal Democrats
- 2004 - Control of Worthing Borough Council returns to the Conservative Party
- 2008 - First Worthing International Birdman event is held
- 2010
  - The South Downs National Park is formed, to include parts of Worthing
  - The Sussex International Piano Competition is founded in Worthing
- 2011 - Population: 104,640
- 2013
  - Kingmere Marine Conservation Zone is created off of the coast of Worthing
  - Splashpoint Leisure Centre opens
- 2014 - Worthing becomes a founding partner of the Greater Brighton City Region
- 2018
  - The first Worthing Pride event takes place
  - Rampion Wind Farm becomes operational off the coast of Worthing
- 2019
  - Bayside Vista becomes Worthing's tallest building at 52 metres (172 ft)
  - Worthing Borough Council declares a climate emergency, which aims to see the council carbon-neutral by 2030.
- 2022 - Worthing Borough Council is led by the Labour Party for the first time

== See also ==
- History of Worthing
- Timeline of Sussex history

Other towns in the historic county of Sussex:

- Timeline of Brighton
- Timeline of Horsham

== Bibliography ==
- Hare, Chris (1991). Historic Worthing: The Untold Story. Cassell Reference. ISBN 9780900075919.

.
