= Tarring =

Tarring may refer to:

- West Tarring, a neighbourhood in Worthing, West Sussex, England
  - Tarring (electoral division), a West Sussex County Council constituency
- Tarring (rope)
- Tarring and feathering
- John Tarring (1806–1875), English ecclesiastical architect
- Tarring Neville, East Sussex, England
