= Durrington & Salvington (electoral division) =

Electoral district in england

Coordinates: 50.83489°N 0.40804°W

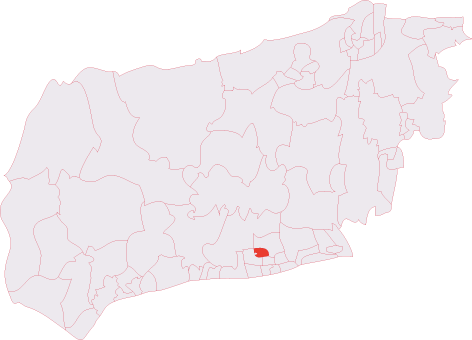
Durrington & Salvington
Shown within West Sussex
| District: | Worthing |
| UK Parliament Constituency: | Worthing West |
| Ceremonial county: | West Sussex |
| Electorate (2009): | 9614 |
County Councillor
Noel Atkins (Conservative)

Durrington & Salvington is an electoral division of West Sussex in England, and returns one member to sit on West Sussex County Council.

== Extent ==
The division covers the neighbourhoods of Durrington and Salvington, which form part of the town of Worthing.

It falls entirely within the un-parished area of Worthing Borough and comprises the following borough wards: Durrington Ward and the southern part of Salvington Ward.

== Election results ==
=== 2013 Election ===
Results of the election held on 2 May 2013:

Durrington & Salvington
| Party | Candidate | Votes | % | ±% |
|---|---|---|---|---|
| UKIP | Trixie Hall | 946 | 38.4 | +15.2 |
| Conservative | Nicola Waight | 906 | 36.8 | −2.7 |
| Liberal Democrats | Michael Donin | 351 | 14.3 | −23.0 |
| Labour | Jillian Guest | 258 | 10.5 | N/A |
| Majority | | 40 | 1.6 | |
| Turnout | | 2,461 | 25.3 | −9.1 |
| UKIP gain from Conservative | | Swing | | |

=== 2009 Election ===
Results of the election held on 4 June 2009:

Durrington & Salvington
| Party | Candidate | Votes | % | ±% |
|---|---|---|---|---|
| Conservative | Nicola Waight | 1,308 | 39.5 | |
| Liberal Democrats | Michael Donin | 1,235 | 37.3 | |
| UKIP | John Wallace | 768 | 23.2 | |
| Majority | | 73 | 2.2 | |
| Turnout | | 3,311 | 34.4 | |
| Conservative win (new seat) | | | | |
