= St Andrew's Church, West Tarring =

St Andrew's Church
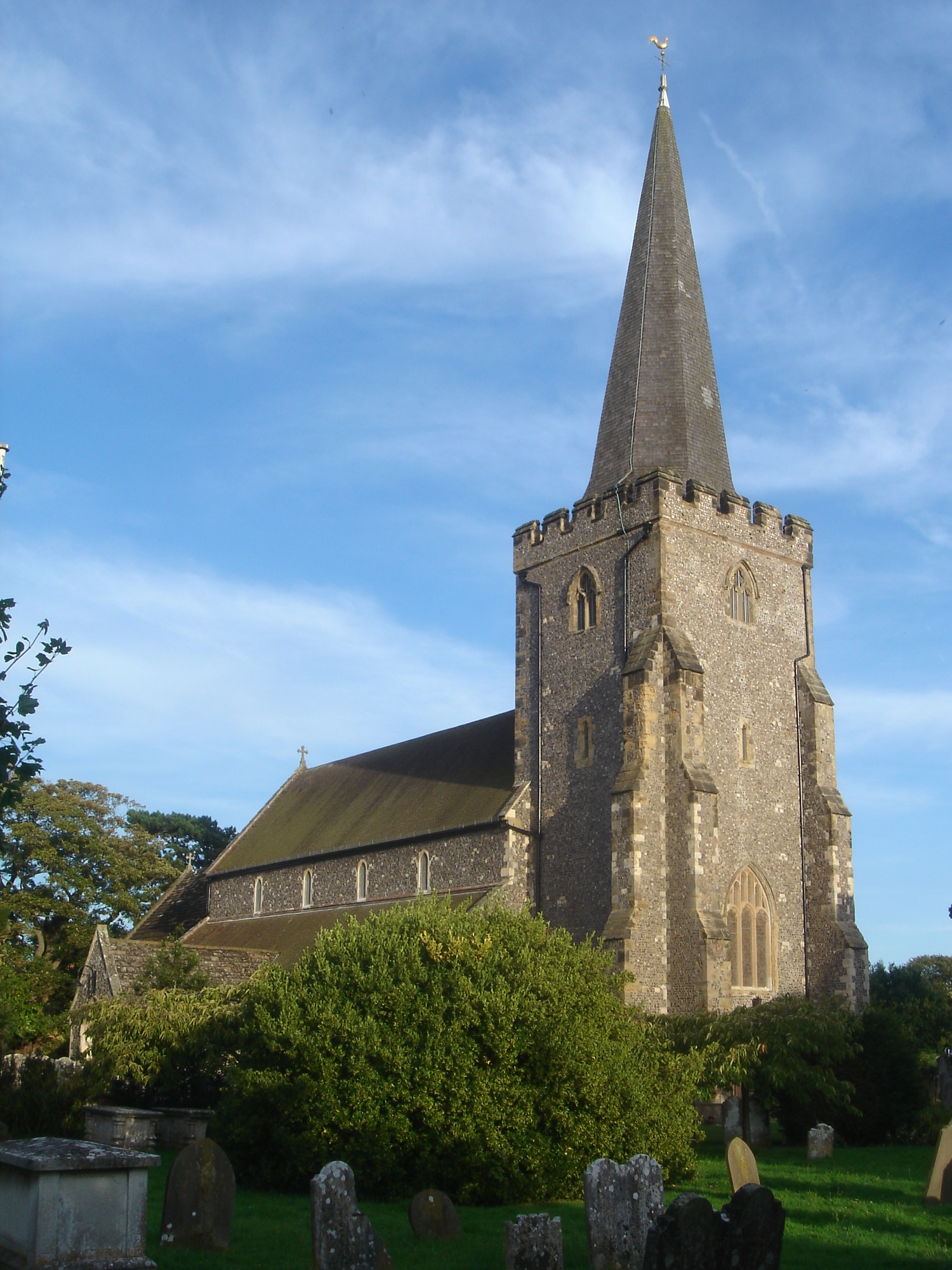
- The church from the northwest
- St Andrew's Church
- 50.8247°N 0.3958°W
- Location: Church Road, West Tarring, Worthing, West Sussex BN13 1HQ
- Country: England
- Denomination: Church of England
- Website: Saint Andrew's Parish Church, West Tarring

History
- Status: Parish church
- Founded: 11th century
- Founder: Archbishop of Canterbury
- Dedication: Saint Andrew
- Dedicated: By 1372

Architecture
- Functional status: Active
- Heritage designation: Grade II*
- Designated: 11 October 1949
- Style: Perpendicular Gothic

Administration
- Province: Canterbury
- Diocese: Chichester
- Archdeaconry: Chichester
- Deanery: Rural Deanery of Worthing
- Parish: West Tarring, St Andrew

Clergy
- Rector: Rev. Fr Steven Emerson

St Andrew's Church is the Church of England parish church of Tarring, West Sussex, England. Founded in the 11th century in a then rural parish which had earlier been granted to the Archbishop of Canterbury, the church remained a peculier of Canterbury for many centuries thereafter. It served nearby parishes when their churches fell into disrepair, John Selden was baptised here, and the church became a base for smuggling. The present building is mostly 13th-century, and its tall spire is a landmark in the area. The church is a Grade II* Listed Building.

== History ==
The parish of West Tarring is now part of the Borough of Worthing, but has ancient origins as a South Downs strip parish of about 1,200 acres (486 ha). It ran for about 3 miles (5 km) from its northern extremity at Bost Hill, on the track to Findon (now the A24 road), to the English Channel coast in the south, and was much narrower apart from a thin strip of land extending westwards. Many coastal parishes in Sussex were this shape: many different soils and varieties of land would be included within the boundaries, from chalky downland in the north to marshy grassland near the coast. Two settlements developed, of which West Tarring was the larger and more central. (The name "Tarring" was, and still is, also used, but the "West" prefix was often used to prevent confusion with Tarring Neville near Lewes.) Salvington, the other settlement in the parish, is high on the slopes of the South Downs.

The first documented description of West Tarring was in about AD 939, when King Athelstan granted the manor of Tarring to Christ Church in Canterbury (now Canterbury Cathedral). At the time of the Domesday Book in 1086 it was still held by the archbishop and had 41 inhabitants. A church is known to have existed at that time; it is likely to have been a wooden building.

The present flint and stone building began to take shape in the mid-13th century. At that time, the rector, Simon of Tarring, provided sanctuary for Richard of Wych (later St Richard of Chichester), the new Bishop of Chichester. He had been barred from his own palace there by King Henry III, who had been angered by the election of Richard as bishop in place of Robert Passelewe. While he was based at the church, Richard travelled throughout Sussex, taking services and reputedly performing miracles; he was canonised in 1262.

The dedication to Saint Andrew was first mentioned in 1372. In the 15th century the chancel and tower were rebuilt, apparently under the influence of Canterbury. The rood screen also dates from that time. The church only had modest wealth — its internal fittings were valued at £6.13s.4d. (£2,690 as of 2025) in 1561 — and unusual fundraising activities were popular. Church ales — drinking sessions held in the church, at which the churchwardens sold beer to raise funds for its upkeep — were popular throughout the 16th century, and often proved to be uproarious occasions at which large quantities of luxurious food were eaten and various entertainers performed.

An organ was installed in the late 16th century. Bells were hung in the tower by 1518, and there were five in 1533. These had been cast at the Tapsel (or Topsell) family's bell foundry near the church; the Tapsels cast many bells in West Tarring, for churches across Sussex, for about 200 years, and also invented the Tapsel gate used in some Sussex churchyards.

The nearby parishes of Durrington and Heene had been linked to West Tarring since the Middle Ages. Their tithes were combined, and they were administered for ecclesiastical purposes by the incumbents of St Andrew's: for example, burials and baptisms were carried out at West Tarring. By the 17th century, in common with many churches in the area, Durrington and Heene's churches had declined and fallen into ruin. By 1680 both were in such poor condition that their parishioners were allowed to travel to worship at St Andrew's instead, and services were no longer held at Durrington or Heene.

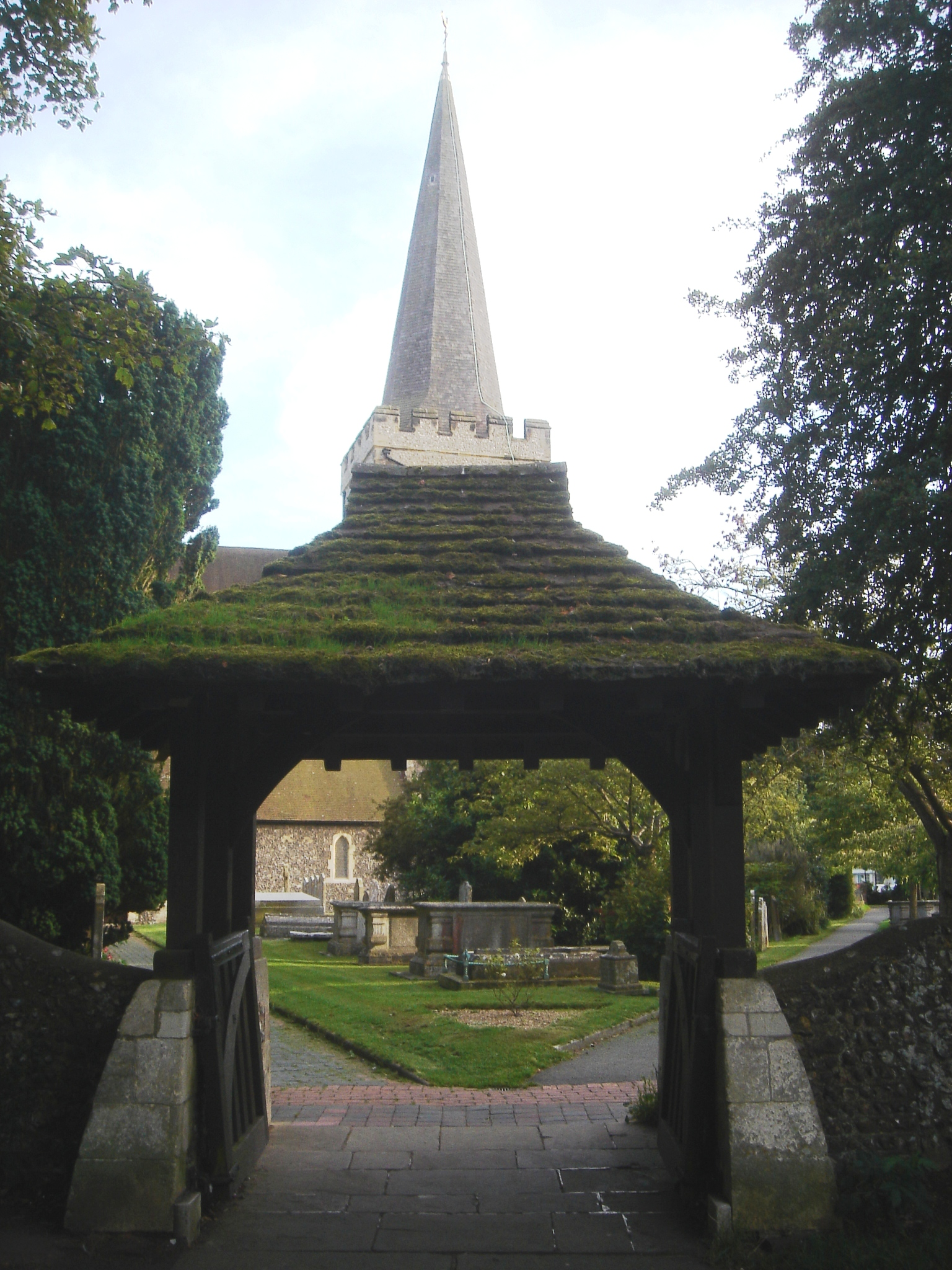
The early 20th-century lychgate, with the spire of the church behind

Major changes were made in the mid-19th century. In 1845 the church ceased to be a peculier of Canterbury and instead was placed under the Diocese of Chichester, in conformity with other Church of England churches in the area. In 1853 the vicar instigated a restoration of the church, raising most of the £2,200 (£241,700 as of 2025) himself. Changes included the removal of the timber west gallery, the addition of a vestry, the stripping of previous interior alterations and a complete overhaul of the interior (although certain fittings were retained and reinstalled), and the replacement of the organ. Also in 1853 Charles and George Mears of the Whitechapel Bell Foundry recast four of the bells into a new ring of six. The restoration took seven months and was completed in time for Holy Week 1854. In 1885 mosaics designed by the Gothic Revival architect William Butterfield were installed by Italian craftsmen in the aisles and around the tower arch. The church roof partly collapsed around the same time and had to be repaired. In the 20th century a lychgate was erected at the churchyard entrance, the reredos was replaced, the organ was replaced again, the roof of the chancel was renewed and some stained glass was added.

The font was replaced with a Victorian one: the main section of its medieval predecessor was removed and taken to Australia by the Henty family when they emigrated. The Hentys were successful farmers, especially of merino sheep, and lived in one of West Tarring's largest houses. Thomas Henty, the patriarch, sent three of his sons and 150 sheep to Western Australia in 1829. Eventually the whole family moved to Australia: the pioneers settled in Tasmania, while Edward Henty, another son, became the first settler in Victoria and was instrumental in developing the sheep-rearing industry there. They gave the font they had taken with them to a cathedral in Melbourne, which some sources state is St Patrick's Cathedral, Melbourne while the Sussex Parish Churches website states this was at St Paul's Cathedral, Melbourne, the architect of which, William Butterfield had previously worked at St Andrew's Church.

Smuggling was popular in the Worthing area between the early 18th and early 19th centuries — sometimes out of necessity, such as during a period of economic hardship in the 1820s which caused the developing town to stagnate. One of the leading smugglers at that time, William Cowerson, was employed at St Andrew's Church on restoration work; he regularly used the table tombs in the churchyard to store smuggled alcohol and other contraband.

== Building ==
St Andrew's Church is an Early English Gothic building with some Perpendicular Gothic elements. It is a knapped flint structure with stone dressings, and is relatively large in comparison with others in the area—probably because of the influence of Canterbury.

The nave survives in its entirety from the 13th century. It has five bays with aisles, a clerestory, a vestry on the south side and porches on the north and south sides. The aisles and clerestory have lancet windows, and the whole composition is in the Early English style. The chancel and tower were rebuilt in the 15th century in the Perpendicular style, and the tall octagonal shingled spire was added in the 16th century. The chancel has Perpendicular-style windows with two lights; some of the tower windows more closely resemble the earlier Decorated Gothic style. The east window of the chancel is more ornate than usual: paired shorter lights flank a much taller central light which is surrounded at the top by sexfoils (six-lobed circular openings). The tower and chancel have buttresses with quoins and dressings of ashlar. The tower also has an interior stair-turret in one corner. Its west door, in the Perpendicular style with a hood mould, is not original: it was inserted in the late 15th century. The windows above it have elaborate tracery. Paul Chapman of Hove-based stained glass designers Cox & Barnard made windows for the west ends of the north and south aisles. They were installed in 1958 and depict Saint Thomas of Canterbury and Saint Richard of Chichester respectively.

Inside, there are five pointed arches on each side of the nave, with round columns topped by capitals. The mosaic decoration, depicting the Twelve Apostles, runs between and above them, and extends to the tower arch with its octagonal columns. The chancel arch was restored in the mid-19th century, but the 15th-century chancel screen was retained during the renovations of 1853. Also in the chancel are six misericords, two with carved heads.

There are several memorials in the church. The Henty family is commemorated by a tablet and a 19th-century window near the altar; there is also a window for Robert Southey, the poet, who was the father-in-law of the vicar (Reverend J. Warter) who had restored the church in the mid-19th century. The most famous man associated with St Andrew's Church, John Selden, was baptised here in 1584 and has a memorial and a plaque.

== The church today ==
St Andrew's Parish Church has been a Grade II* Listed Building since 11 October 1949. Such buildings are defined as being "particularly important" and "of more than special interest". As of February 2001 it was one of eight Grade II* listed buildings in the borough of Worthing.

Today the ecclesiastical parish is smaller than the ancient parish, but the northern part up to Salvington is retained. The other boundaries are the railway line to the south, The Boulevard in the west and a line west of Loxwood Avenue to the east.

== See also ==
- List of places of worship in Worthing
