= Horace Mitchell (cricketer) =

English cricketer

Personal information
- Full name: Horace Mitchell
- Born: 9 February 1858; West Tarring, Sussex, England
- Died: 4 January 1951 (aged 92); West Tarring, Sussex, England
- Batting: Right-handed
- Bowling: Right-arm medium-fast

Domestic team information
- Years: Team
- 1882–1891: Sussex

Career statistics
Competition	First-class
Matches	8
Runs scored	44
Batting average	4.00
100s/50s	–/–
Top score	9
Balls bowled	867
Wickets	19
Bowling average	18.68
5 wickets in innings	1
10 wickets in match	–
Best bowling	5/35
Catches/stumpings	–/–
- Source: Cricinfo, 28 January 2012

Horace Mitchell (19 January 1858 – 4 January 1951) was an English cricketer. Mitchell was a right-handed batsman by bowled right-arm medium-fast. He was born at West Tarring, Sussex.

Mitchell made his first-class debut for Sussex against the Marylebone Cricket Club in 1882. He made two further appearances in that season for Sussex against Hampshire and Yorkshire, before next appearing for Sussex in first-class cricket in the 1891 County Championship against Lancashire. He made four further first-class appearances for the county in 1891, the last of which came against Surrey. With his role as a bowler, Mitchell took a total of 19 wickets at an average of 18.68, with best figures of 5/35. These figures were his only five-wicket haul and came against Lancashire in 1891. A poor batsman, Mitchell scored 44 runs at a batting average of 4.00, with a high score of 9.

He died at the village of his birth on 4 January 1951.
