= High Street, Worthing =

Road in the centre of the town of Worthing, West Sussex

High Street
- Interactive map of High Street
- Former name: Old Worthing Street
- Maintained by: West Sussex County Council
- Length: 700 m (2,300 ft)
- Location: Worthing, United Kingdom
- Postal code: BN11
- North end: Upper High Street
- South end: Warwick Street / The Steyne / Brighton Road

High Street, Worthing is a road in the centre of the town of Worthing, West Sussex, running from Little High Street to The Steyne. It is designated as part of the A259, a major road between Emsworth in Hampshire and Folkestone in Kent.

One of the oldest streets in Worthing, High Street was part of a droveway used across the South Downs into the Weald and probably formed the main reference point of north-south routes on Worthing's Roman grid form marking out a field system known as centuriation.

High Street formed a large part of the pre-resort settlement of Worthing and until was the main street in Worthing until the early 19th century. Road-widening and redevelopment in the second half of the 20th century removed most of the historic buildings and street frontages along High Street.

== History ==
High Street is one of only a few streets that existed in the hamlet of Worthing in the 18th century and probably much earlier. High Street connected with Upper High Street, Little High Street and Middle Street (now North Street) which led to North Street (now the northern part of Chapel Road). At the southern end of High Street early Worthing had a crossroads with East Lane (now Brighton Road) and West Lane (now Warwick Street and South Street).

In the 1780s a marine villa was built on the east side of the south end of High Street. Bought and enlarged by George Greville, 2nd Earl of Warwick, it became known as Warwick House. In the summer of 1802, Thomas Trotter held theatrical performances for three months in a barn at the north end of High Street. The performances were successful and led to residents signing a petition the following year advocating the construction of a permanent theatre in Worthing, the first of which was built in nearby Ann Street in 1807. An army barracks was built on High Street in 1805 where a garrison was stationed in preparation for a possible invasion from Napoleon. The building was closed in 1812 when it became the first free school for boys in Worthing. When Chapel Road was created in 1817 it replaced High Street as the main entrance to the town from the north. This position was further strengthened in 1835 when Worthing's first Town Hall was built at the junction of Chapel Road with South Street and Warwick Street. In 1832, the leader of Worthing's last smuggling gang was shot dead at point blank range whilst escaping across a narrow footbridge across the Teville Stream after customs officials chased around 200 smugglers from the seafront and up High Street. An inquest into the incident was held at the Golden Anchor public house (today's Corner House) where the killing was found to be justified.

In 1896 Warwick House was demolished and redeveloped. In 1904 Worthing's Central Fire Station was built on the corner of Charlecote Road, previously part of Warwick House. The fire station was moved to Broadwater in 1962 and the old Central Fire Station was demolished in 1969, after which it was replaced with Crown House, a building of the Department of Social Security (now the Department for Work and Pensions). T.H. Winney's perpredicular-style building was used as an evangelical church from 1926 to 1988, when it became a restaurant and a bar. In the 1960s buildings on the west side of High Street were demolished as part of plans to widen High Street into a dual carriageway. The plans were abandoned in 2008.

In 2019 Worthing Borough Council announced plans to build a hotel and residential flats along the west side of High Street as part of plans to redevelop the former police station site at the junction with Union Place. In 2020 Worthing Borough Council proposed the redevelopment of derelict buildings near Ann Street to expand the creative hub at Colonnade House.

== Today ==
High Street has an art gallery at each end, the Forge at the north end and Colonnade House at the south end. There is a Waitrose & Partners supermarket, a multi-storey car park and a mixture of residential and commercial buildings. There are two pubs, both by the junction with North Street - the New Amsterdam and the Corner House, and a bar in the former St James' Church.

== Gallery ==
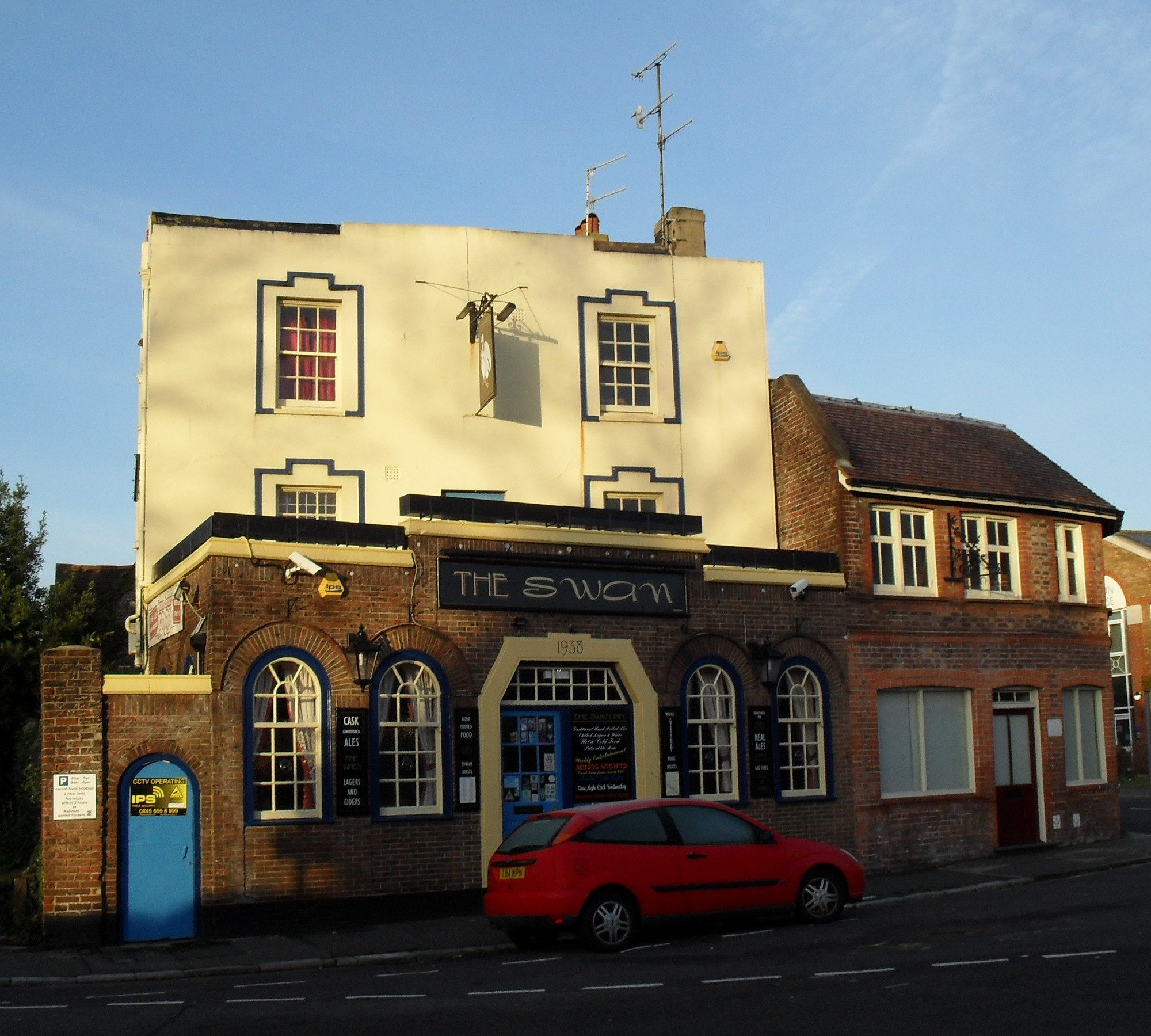
The New Amsterdam (formerly the Swan Inn)

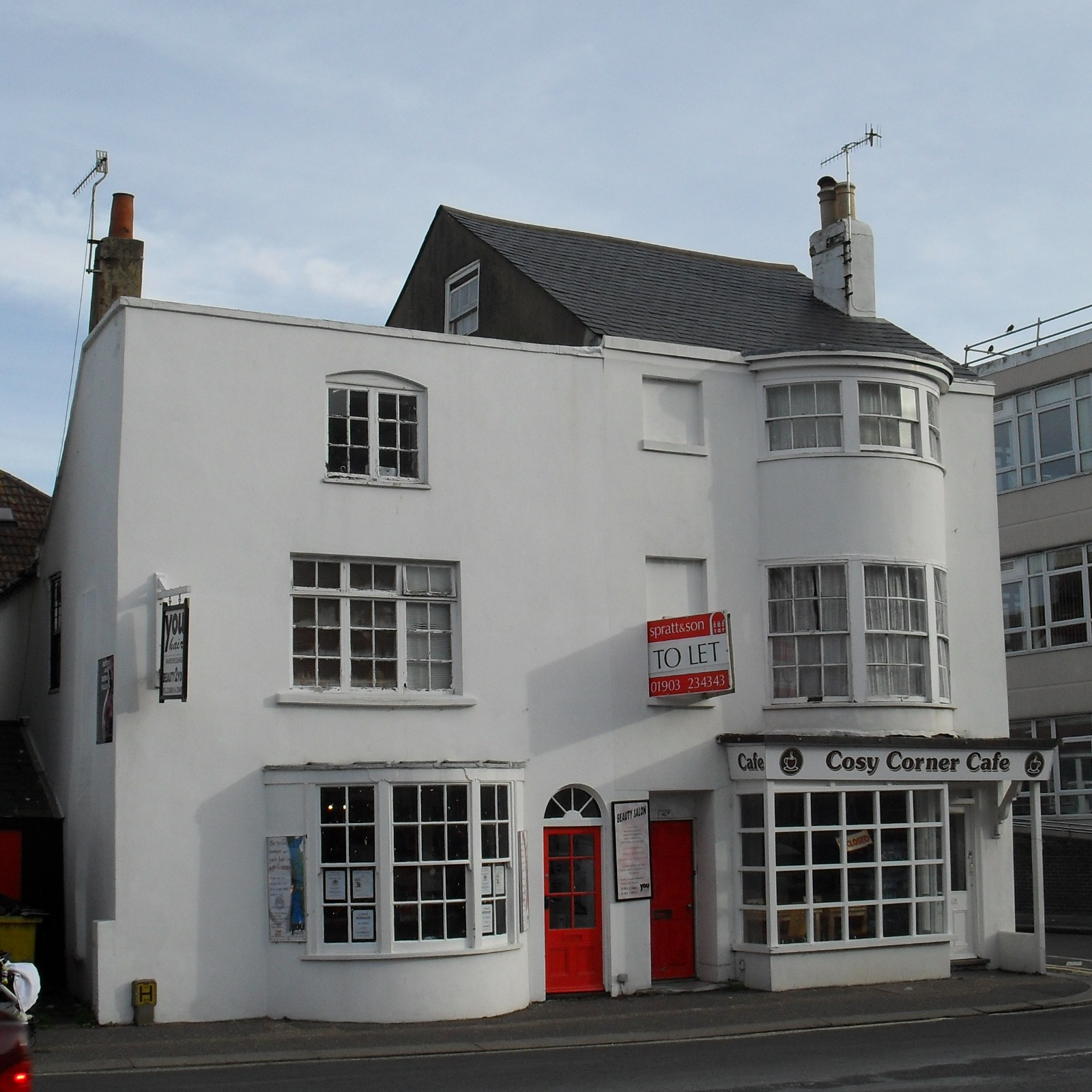
40/40A (right) and 42 (left) High Street

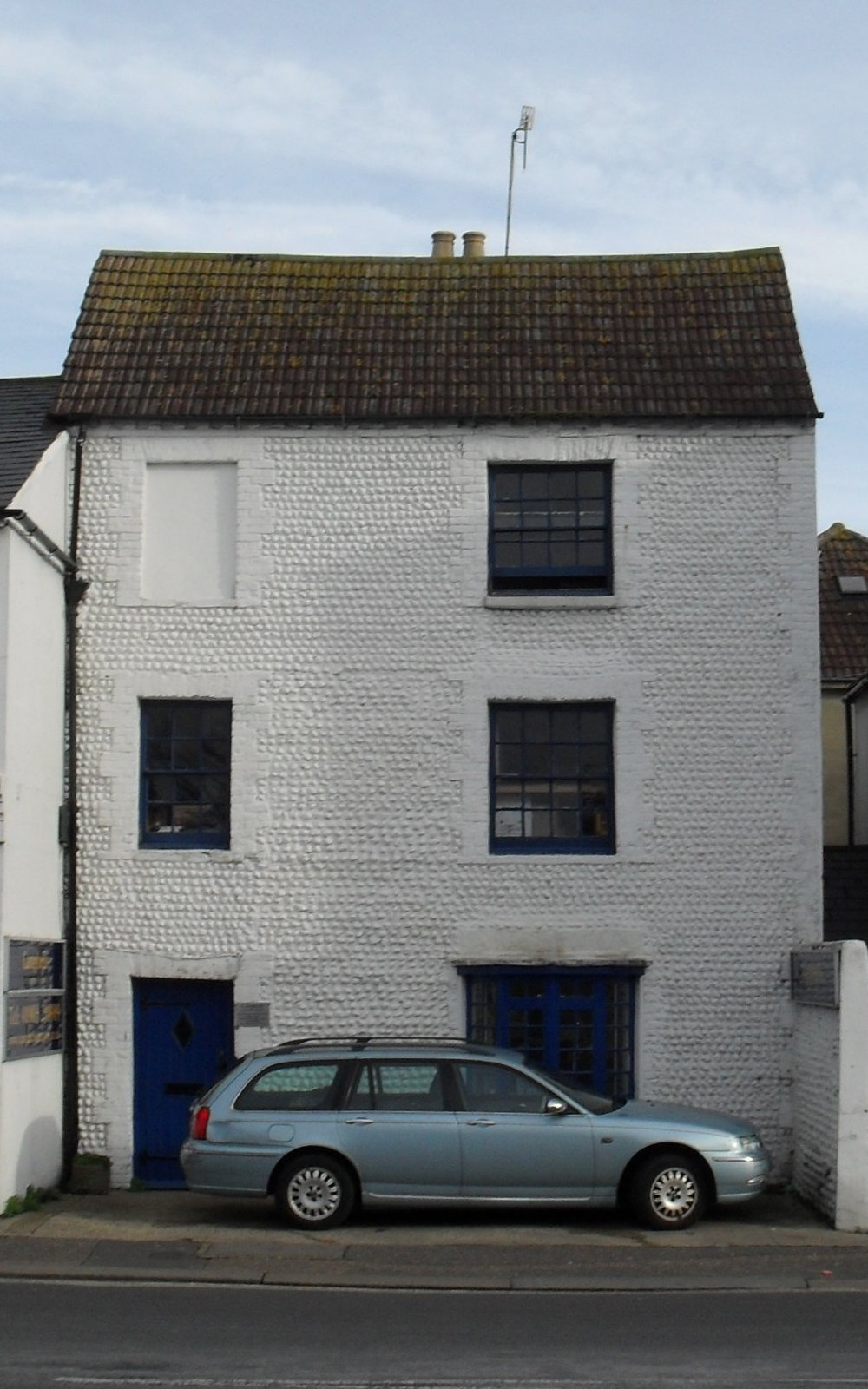
The cobble-fronted cottage at 44 High Street

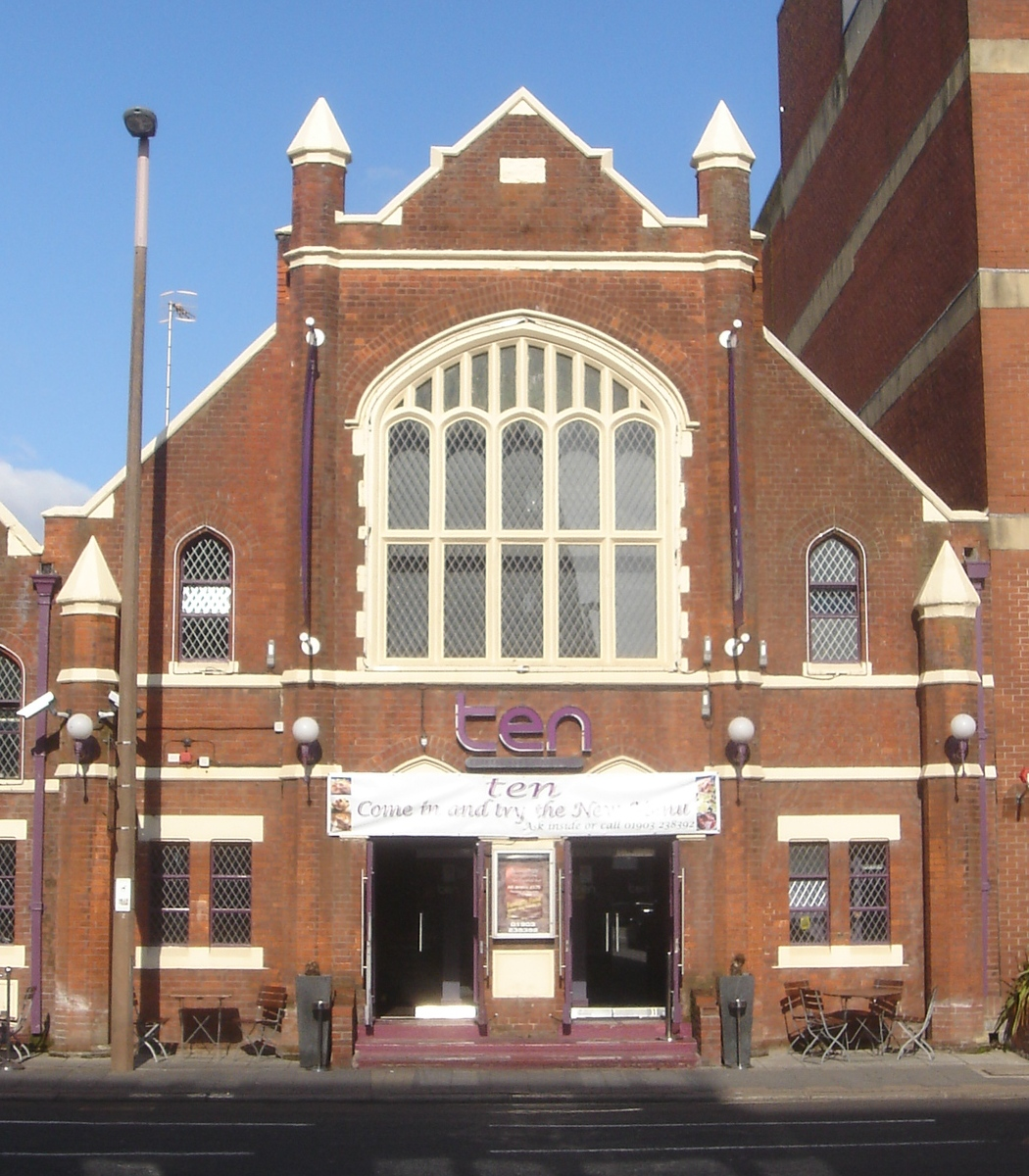
The former St James' Evangelical Free Church, now a public house

== See also ==
- History of Worthing
- Listed buildings in Worthing
