= Tarring (electoral division) =

Electoral division of West Sussex, UK

Coordinates: 50.82448°N 0.39259°W

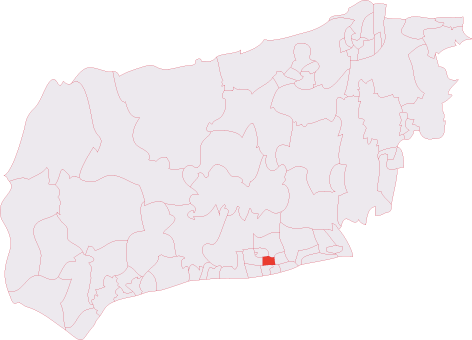
Tarring
Shown within West Sussex
District:	Worthing
UK Parliament Constituency:	East Worthing & Shoreham, Worthing West
Ceremonial county:	West Sussex
Electorate (2009):	9838
County Councillor
Bob Smytherman (LD)

Tarring is an electoral division of West Sussex in the United Kingdom, and returns one member to sit on West Sussex County Council.

== Extent ==
The division covers the neighbourhood of West Tarring, which forms part of the urban area of the town of Worthing and came into existence as the result of a boundary review recommended by the Boundary Committee for England, the results of which were accepted by the Electoral Commission in March 2009.

It falls entirely within the un-parished area of Worthing Borough and comprises some or all of the following borough wards: Gaisford Ward (western portion) and Tarring Ward.

== Election results ==
=== 2013 Election ===
Results of the election held on 2 May 2013:

Tarring
Party	Candidate	Votes	%	±%
Liberal Democrats	Robert Smytherman	851	33.1	−14.3
UKIP	Shaune King	702	27.3	+9.2
Conservative	Sean McDonald	593	23.0	−6.0
Labour	Michael Brown	228	8.9	+3.4
Green	William Morris	199	7.7	N/A
Majority		149	5.8	−12.6
Turnout		2,573	26.0	−9.3
Liberal Democrats hold		Swing		

=== 2009 Election ===
Results of the election held on 4 June 2009:

Tarring
Party	Candidate	Votes	%	±%
Liberal Democrats	Robert Smytherman	1,646	47.4	
Conservative	Paul High	1,007	29.0	
UKIP	John Harwood	628	18.1	
Labour	Sid Wells	191	5.5	
Majority		639	18.4	
Turnout		3,472	35.3	
Liberal Democrats win (new seat)				
