= St Andrew the Apostle Church, Worthing =

St Andrew the Apostle Church
- Church of St Andrew the Apostle
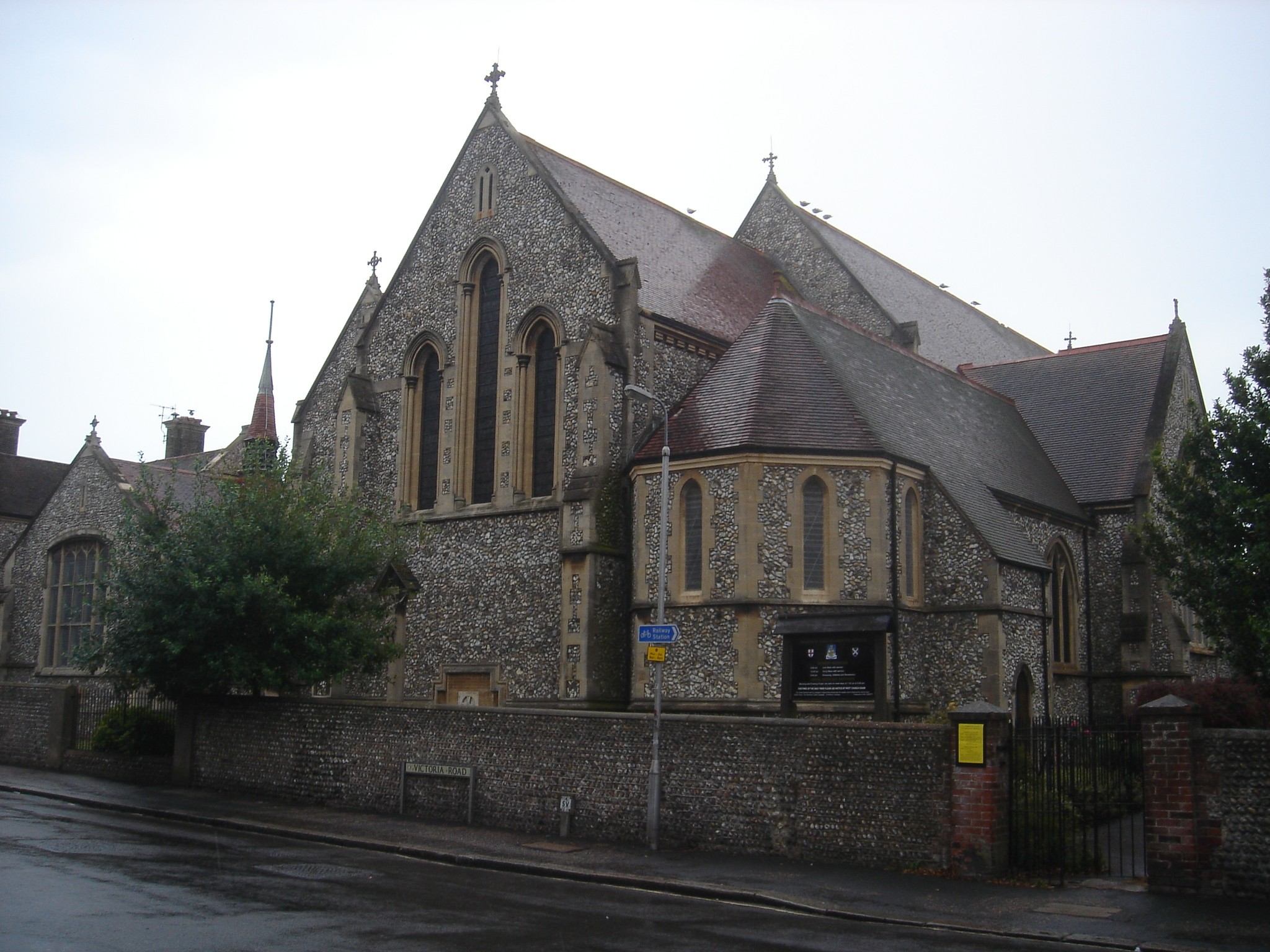
- The church from the southeast
- St Andrew the Apostle Church
- 50.8153°N 0.3774°W
- OS grid reference: TQ 14388 03007
- Location: Victoria Road/Clifton Road, Worthing, West Sussex BN11 1XB
- Country: England
- Denomination: Anglican
- Churchmanship: High church/Anglo-Catholic
- Website: www.standrewsworthing.org.uk

History
- Status: Parish church
- Founded: 1882
- Founder: George Wedd
- Dedication: Andrew the Apostle
- Consecrated: 1888

Architecture
- Functional status: Active
- Heritage designation: Grade II
- Designated: 21 May 1976
- Architect: Arthur Blomfield
- Style: Early English
- Groundbreaking: 1885
- Completed: 1886

Administration
- Province: Canterbury
- Diocese: Chichester
- Archdeaconry: Chichester
- Deanery: Rural Deanery of Worthing
- Parish: Worthing, St Andrew

Clergy
- Priest: Fr John Eldridge

St Andrew the Apostle (in full, the Church of St Andrew the Apostle) is an Anglican church in Worthing, West Sussex, England. Built between 1885 and 1886 in the Early English Gothic style by Sir Arthur Blomfield, "one of the last great Gothic revivalists", the church was embroiled in controversy as soon as it was founded. During a period of religious unrest in the town, theological tensions within Anglicanism between High church Anglo-Catholics and Low church Anglicans were inflamed by what the latter group saw as the church's "idolatrous" Roman Catholic-style fittings—in particular, a statue of the Virgin Mary which was seized upon by opponents as an example of a reversion to Catholic-style worship in the Church of England. The "Worthing Madonna" dispute delayed the consecration of the church by several years. English Heritage has listed the building at Grade C for its architectural and historical importance, and the adjacent vestry and vicarage are listed separately at Grade II.

== History ==
Worthing experienced fitful but often rapid growth throughout the 19th century after it became established as a town and seaside resort at the start of the 19th century. Between 1801, two years before an Act of Parliament gave it the status of a town, and 1881, the population increased from about 2,000 to 14,000. The era coincided with a revival in Anglican Christian worship: this was especially marked in Brighton, Worthing's larger and more illustrious rival resort further along the Sussex coast, whose vicar Arthur Wagner funded and built many churches across the town.

Sussex was a religiously conservative county, and by the middle of the 19th century—after the Catholic Emancipation—serious disputes arose between traditionalist Protestant Anglicans, who regarded Catholic-style worship with suspicion, and the newly emerging Anglo-Catholic practices of Anglicans who were influenced by the Oxford Movement (Tractarianism) of practitioners such as Edward Bouverie Pusey and John Keble. The disagreements were again focused on Brighton, but ill-feeling had spread to Worthing by the 1850s. The town had a long tradition of riotous bonfire parades, and the "Bonfire Boys" started to focus their attention on Roman Catholics and Tractarians. Effigies of John Henry Newman and an unidentified Tractarian were burnt in 1853 and 1859 respectively; clergymen who had Tractarian beliefs were considered to be traitors to the Protestant cause.

Other groups—including the police, wealthy residents and the Salvation Army—became the Bonfire Boys' target later in the century; this culminated in the Skeleton Army riots of the 1880s, when Worthing's newly established Salvation Army was violently opposed. The Roman Catholic community became accepted, and anti-Tractarian feeling briefly receded.

In the early 1880s, a group of High church, Anglo-Catholic Anglicans sought to establish a church of that character in central Worthing. George Wedd, the owner of Charmandean House (a large Georgian house, now demolished), was the main promoter of the scheme, and he found and bought some land in 1881 in an area which had seen recent residential development. He also provided much of the funding for the construction, and Arthur Blomfield was contracted to design and build the church. Preparation work started in 1882, the foundation stone was laid on 13 June 1885, and building work continued until 1886. Disagreements had already begun in November 1882, when the Worthing Town Commissioners sought permission to take territory from the parishes of several other churches in the town—St Mary's, Christ Church and Holy Trinity—and form a new parish for St Andrew's Church. The clergy of the three churches opposed the proposal, arguing that their parishes were not "large in extent and population, and insufficiently supplied with ministers and church accommodation" as stipulated in the terms of the proposal. It was argued that the site for St Andrew's Church was in the part of Worthing where the highest concentration of churches already existed: it would be the ninth Anglican church or mission hall in an area of 1 square mile (2.6 km^{2}) encompassing central Worthing and Broadwater.

As debate over this issue continued, more controversy erupted when in late 1886, as the church was being completed, it was discovered that a Lady chapel with a statue of the Virgin and Child had been included in the design. To opponents of Anglo-Catholic worship, the representation in statue form of Jesus's mother symbolised a return to the practices that the English Reformation had sought to end: it was claimed that idolatry and ritualism would be encouraged and Anglican churches would start to be decorated in the same manner as Roman Catholic places of worship. The statue was soon referred to as the "Worthing Madonna", and became the focus of the ill-feeling around the church: one writer, chronicling the day of the consecration, started his account by referring to the "peculiarly obnoxious Madonna".

The consecration of the church, set for 1886, was postponed because of the strength of feeling in Worthing (and possibly in an attempt to prevent religious riots similar to those of the Skeleton Army two years previously). The vicar of the Holy Trinity, other Worthing vicars, a local army Major-General and the local magistrate were among a group of people who presented a petition to the Bishop of Chichester asking for the consecration to be stopped, arguing that the Madonna was "at variance with the spirit and teaching of our Reformed church". The Bishop, Richard Durnford, held out against the protests, cautioning against the disrespectful use of the term "Madonna" and recommending that the group's grievances be taken to a higher court. The consecration was eventually scheduled for 1888, two years after the church was finished; a final appeal to the House of Lords was unsuccessful, and the ceremony was held on 1 August 1888 by Bishop Durnford. The first public service had been held on 27 May 1888.

The ill-feeling between Anglo-Catholics and their opponents soon died down, apart from some brief controversy in the mid-1890s over some fittings in Christ Church. After World War I, there was a further brief dispute over the design of a war memorial in St Andrew's Church, which took the form of a shrine depicting the Crucifixion designed by Charles Eamer Kempe. It was installed in 1919. The names of local war dead were inscribed on the a panel on the chancel wall.

Since its opening, the exterior of St Andrew's Church has experienced little change, and there have been only gradual increases in the decoration of the interior. A new marble altar was placed in the chancel in 1902, one year after a wooden altar was added in the Lady chapel. A rood screen, carved in oak, and walnut-wood choir stalls were added in 1905 (the latter were replaced by oak stalls in 1932). Another altar, this time in the south transept, was installed in 1922. The red alabaster piece was designed by Charles Eamer Kempe. A green marble altar was donated to the church in 1950 and was placed in the north transept. Work undertaken in the 1970s included the painting of the internal brickwork and the creation of a glass-walled memorial to a former vicar.

Like many 19th-century churches in Worthing, St Andrew's established a mission hall as the population of Anglican worshippers grew. The building, in Victoria Road, was founded in about 1900 but has since been demolished.

== Architecture ==
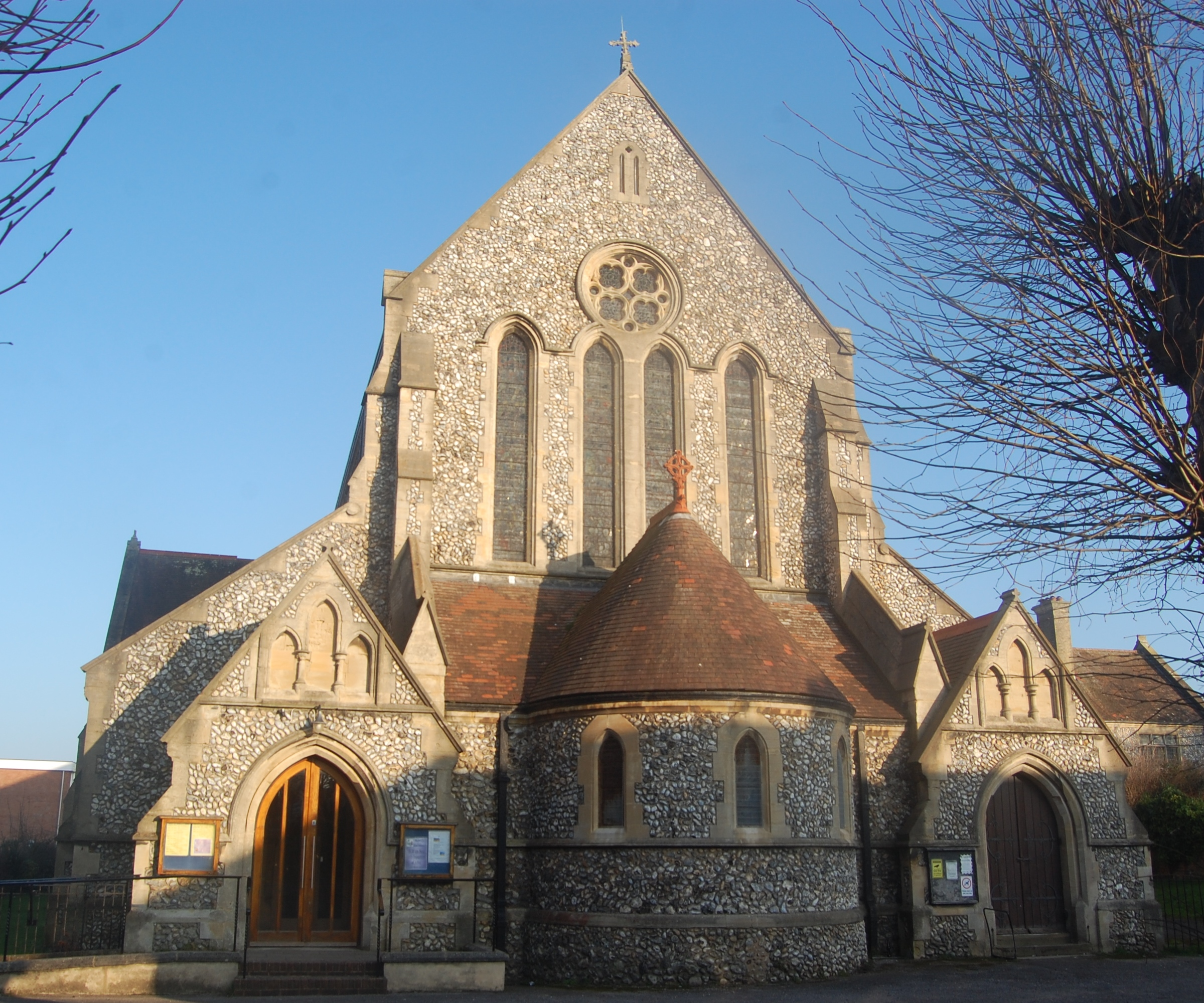
The chancel has an apsidal end.

Arthur Blomfield used the Early English Gothic style for St Andrew's Church. Standing on a wide, narrow east–west site between Victoria and Clifton Roads, the cruciform building occupies little ground space but is correspondingly tall. It is mostly of brick clad with flint and dressed with Bath stone. The roof is laid with tiles. The plan features a nave with aisles and transepts to form the cruciform shape, a baptistery, a chancel, Lady chapel and a sacristy. The former vestry is now a hall. The Lady chapel, originally called the Morning Chapel, runs parallel to the north side of the chancel and has an apsidal end and a vaulted roof in seven parts. The baptistery also has an apse. The walls at the Lady chapel end are thicker than elsewhere in the church: a tower was planned for that end, and the walls would have had to support it. The chancel originally had a tiled floor, but it was replaced by stone in the 1930s.

Inside, the fittings are ornate and extensive. Charles Eamer Kempe provided most of the stained glass and an intricately carved wooden reredos. The "Worthing Madonna" represents the Virgin Mary and the baby Jesus, stands in a recess in the apse of the Lady chapel, and was executed in Caen stone by sculptor Harry Hems of Exeter, Devon. The stone has a gold and dark red mosaic-style border. Hems also made the font, a stone structure in the baptistery, although Arthur Blomfield drew up the design.

Kempe's stained glass is extensive: all but four windows in the church feature his designs, and these exceptions were the work of his cousin and collaborator Walter Tower. Scenes portrayed include the Nativity of Jesus, the Epiphany, John the Evangelist, John the Baptist and several other saints, the Resurrection of Jesus and the Twelve Apostles. In addition, one of Kempe's earliest known windows—designed for All Souls Church in Brighton and depicting Mary, Martha and the Four Evangelists—was retrieved from that church when it was demolished in the 1960s, and was installed in the sacristy.

== Vestry and vicarage ==
The former vestry was added to the church in a matching style in 1908–9 by T.R. Hide. It was originally thought to have been contemporary with the church. The flint and stone structure has gently arched Perpendicular-style windows at its east and west ends; each have five lights. Another window, with three panes, is close to the wall joining the building to the church at the southeast corner. It is now used as the church hall.

In 1924, another architect, K.D. Young, added the vicarage. Its design is similar to that of the vestry and church, and it was also thought to have been built at the same time until later research disproved this. The flint and stone structure has a twin-gable east façade, windows of unequal sizes (and including one bay window) but all with transoms and mullions, and two very narrow windows above first-floor level. The gables are not of equal size.

Both structures were listed at Grade II by English Heritage on 21 May 1976, at the same time as the church. They are two of the 198 buildings in Worthing which are listed at Grade II or C.

== The church today ==
St Andrew's Church was listed at Grade C by English Heritage on 21 May 1976. Grade C was the lowest rank on an old grading system used for Anglican churches, before English Heritage extended the standard Grade I, II* and II scheme to all types of building. A small number of churches remain on the old scheme, on which Grade C is equivalent to Grade II. As of February 2001, it was one of 198 Grade II- or C-listed buildings, and 213 listed buildings of all grades, in the Borough of Worthing. (These totals have since changed because of new listings and delistings.)

The parish of St Andrew's is believed to be one of the smallest in the Diocese of Chichester, and is known to be the smallest in Worthing. It covers a few streets south of Worthing railway station in an area bounded by the railway line to the north, Broadwater Road to the east, Wenban, Elizabeth and Cambridge Roads to the south and Clifton Road to the east.

== See also ==
- Official website of St Andrew the Apostle in Worthing
- Listed buildings in Worthing
- List of places of worship in Worthing

== Bibliography ==
- Anon. (1889). St Andrew's Church, Worthing. An Account of the Proceedings of the Bishop of Chichester, and of the Ecclesiastical Commissioners in connection therewith. Covent Garden, London: G. Slater.
- Beevers, David; Marks, Richard; Roles, John (1989). Sussex Churches and Chapels. Brighton: The Royal Pavilion, Art Gallery and Museums. ISBN 0-948723-11-4.
- Carder, Timothy (1990). The Encyclopaedia of Brighton. Lewes: East Sussex County Libraries. ISBN 0-86147-315-9.
- Elleray, D. Robert (1977). Worthing: a Pictorial History. Chichester: Phillimore & Co. ISBN 0-85033-263-X.
- Elleray, D. Robert (1985). Worthing: Aspects of Change. Chichester: Phillimore & Co. ISBN 0-85033-551-5.
- Elleray, D. Robert (1998). A Millennium Encyclopaedia of Worthing History. Worthing: Optimus Books. ISBN 0-9533132-0-4.
- Elleray, D. Robert (2004). Sussex Places of Worship. Worthing: Optimus Books. ISBN 0-9533132-7-1.
- Greenwood, John (1988). The Church of Saint Andrew the Apostle Centenary: 1888–1988. n.p.
- Hare, Chris (1991). Historic Worthing: The Untold Story. Adlestrop: The Windrush Press. ISBN 0-900075-91-0.
