= Durrington, West Sussex =

Community in West Sussex, England

Coordinates: 50.83573°N 0.4124°W

Durrington
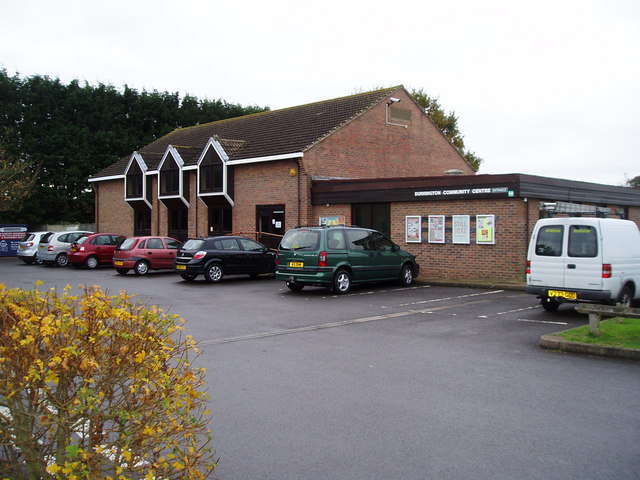

- Location within West Sussex
- Population: 5,528 (2011.Ward)
- OS grid reference: TQ118052
- District: Worthing
- Shire county: West Sussex
- Region: South East
- Country: England
- Sovereign state: United Kingdom
- Post town: WORTHING
- Postcode district: BN13 2, BN13 3
- Dialling code: 01903
- Police: Sussex
- Fire: West Sussex
- Ambulance: South East Coast
- UK Parliament: Worthing West

Durrington is a neighbourhood of Worthing and former civil parish, now in the borough of Worthing in West Sussex, England. Historically in Sussex, in the rape of Bramber, it is situated near the A27 road, 2.3 miles (3.7 km) northwest of the town centre. Durrington has existed since at least the tenth century and has had a place of worship at the site of St Symphorian's Church for approximately a thousand years. Since 1992 it has been home to the community-led Durrington Festival.

== History ==
Durrington means 'Dēora's farmstead', Dēora presumably being the name of a Saxon settler. In common with many neighbouring settlements during the Saxon era, the local people also had land in the Weald, which would have been used for seasonal pasture for animals. Their land was at 'Dēoringa wīc' (modern-day Drungewick, in the parish of Loxwood).

Durrington was first recorded in 934 as a Saxon estate. In that year, King Athelstan granted some of the land to one of his thegns. By the time of the Domesday survey in 1086, Robert le Sauvage—lord of the manor of nearby Broadwater—held the land. The civil and ecclesiastical parish was smaller than the Saxon estate: it extended for about 2 miles (3.2 km) from north to south and 0.7 miles (1.1 km) from east to west.

The Domesday survey recorded that Durrington had "a church, eight acres of meadow and a wood of ten hogs". The church had existed since Saxon times, no later than the 11th century, but little is known of it: the structure was probably built of plaster, wattle and daub and thatch, in common with other churches of the era. It was dedicated to St Nicholas. In about 1265, the church was rebuilt and rededicated to Thomas Becket. The new design, a simple two-cell building, had a 56 by 29 feet (17.1 m × 8.8 m) nave and a 23 by 19 feet (7.0 m × 5.8 m) chancel separated by a rood screen, above which was a crucifix.

There was also a wall-mounted stone pulpit, a stone altar, a series of tall, pointed windows high in the walls, an unadorned stone font and a short wooden steeple—little more than an extended belfry—extending from the nave roof. The new church was still a chapelry of St Andrew's Church at nearby West Tarring: this meant that it was served and administered by clergy from that church, and most of the parish's tithes were paid to St Andrew's. It was not an independent parish church.

In 1643, during the English Civil War, St Symphorian's Church—Durrington's Anglican church—was partially destroyed by Roundhead soldiers after the Royalist vicar had supposedly tried to gain support for the Royalist cause amongst his parishioners. The church remained ruined until 1915 when a new church was built, which included some of the original stones.

Durrington was also the location of the first civil partnership formed under the Civil Partnership Act 2004, taking place on 5 December 2005 between Matthew Roche and Christopher Cramp at St Barnabas' Hospice.

== Governance ==
Modern Durrington lies within the borough of Worthing and lies mostly in the Durrington ward. Neighbouring West Durrington forms Castle ward. Each ward has two councillors which represent their area on Worthing Borough Council. For elections to West Sussex County Council most of the area is represented by the Durrington & Salvington electoral division. The area is represented at Westminster by the Worthing West constituency.

Until the 16th century when it became a parish in its own right, Durrington formed part of the parish of West Tarring. The parish of Durrington was enlarged in 1902 to include parts of the parishes of Tarring and Broadwater, including Salvington. On 1 April 1929 the parish was abolished and merged with Worthing and Durrington became part of the borough of Worthing. In 1921 the parish had a population of 1182.

== Transport ==
The nearest railway station is Durrington-on-Sea railway station in Goring, about 1.3 miles (2.1 km) to the south. The major trunk road A27 runs along the northern boundary of Durrington, leading east to Broadwater, Lancing and Brighton, and west to Chichester, Portsmouth and the M27 motorway. Routes north to Horsham and on to the M25 motorway and London are via the nearby A24 trunk road.

== Durrington Festival ==
In 1992, the annual Durrington festival was founded by residents Dave Butler and Dave Collard. The festival is "a week long celebration of what Durrington has to offer". The festival committee, composed of local residents and led by Jack Clements aims to "provide opportunities for a diverse range of performers, groups, charities and business to promote what is good about living and working in Durrington".
