= Salvington =

Neighbourhood of Worthing, West Sussex, England

Coordinates: 50.83513°N 0.3984°W

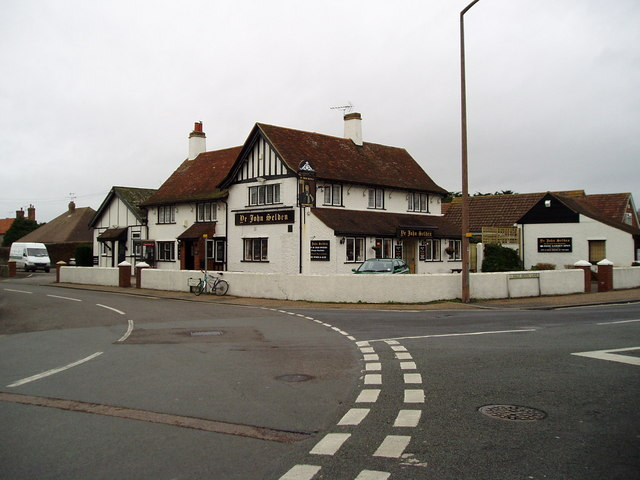
- Ye John Selden pub is the main public house in Salvington

- Location within West Sussex
- Population: 8,893 (2011.Ward)
- OS grid reference: TQ128051
- District: Worthing
- Shire county: West Sussex
- Region: South East
- Country: England
- Sovereign state: United Kingdom
- Post town: Worthing
- Postcode district: BN13 2
- Police: Sussex
- Fire: West Sussex
- Ambulance: South East Coast
- UK Parliament: Worthing West

Salvington is a neighbourhood of Worthing, in the borough of Worthing in West Sussex, England. It lies south of the A27 road two miles (3 km) north-west of the town centre. It is served by three elected Worthing Borough Councillors at any given time, currently Nicola Waight, Noel Atkins and Michael Cloake, all Conservative.

Salvington is thought to mean either 'Seawolf's farmstead' (Sǣwulf's farmstead) or less romantically, Sǣlāf's farmstead (literally the farmstead of someone named 'sea-leavings' or 'flotsam').

Salvington was originally a hamlet within the parish of West Tarring. When most of Tarring became part of Worthing in 1902, Salvington joined the parish of Durrington which included nearby High Salvington. Salvington finally became part of the borough of Worthing in 1929.

Salvington is probably best known as the birthplace of the great jurist and antiquarian John Selden in 1584. The cottage in which he lived was demolished in the 1960s when it fell into disrepair and was replaced with a row of bungalows. However Salvington's main public house, Ye John Selden, retains his name.

Salvington is also home to 'Old Sussex House' in Salvington Road. This 16th-century building, originally known as 'Salvington Lets' is a listed building and retains in its attic what is possibly the last cockfighting pen in Sussex, surrounded by a thin oak trellis hammered together with hand-made nails.
