= Thomas Trotter (impresario) =

Thomas Trotter (1779–8 September, 1851; Worthing), was an English theatrical impresario active in English provincial theatre in the early nineteenth century. He was based in Worthing, but opened theatres at a number of other locations.

== Theatrical career ==
Thomas was based in Hythe, Kent when he first acted on the stage in 1794, aged 15.

Trotter was a member of the Prestonian Lodge of Perfect Friendship, a freemasonic lodge founded in 1797 and meeting at the Kings's Arms, Grays, Essex. His membership documentation refers to him as a comedian.

== Theatre management ==
Trotter first opened a theatre within an old barn in Worthing High Street in 1802. The three month season was a success, and a petition was created calling for a permanent theatre in the town. The petition was headed by Edward Ogle, whom funded the construction of a new theatre in Ann Street, which opened in 1807. Trotter would run the new theatre, but would in the meantime start building further theatres in Sittingbourne in 1803, Hythe, Kent and Southend-on-Sea in 1804, and run several others in Shoreham-by-Sea, Littlehampton, Arundel, Gravesend, Maidstone and Brighton. Trotter would go and lead the construction of new Royal Baths in Paragon Street, Worthing, which opened in 1823.
