= West Tarring =

Area of Worthing, West Sussex, England

Coordinates: 50.82476°N 0.39385°W

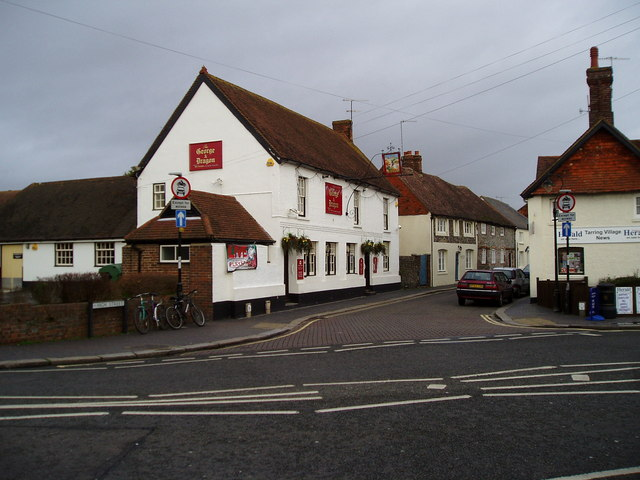
- Tarring High Street

- Location within West Sussex
- Population: 8,646 (2011.Ward)
- OS grid reference: TQ132040
- District: Worthing
- Shire county: West Sussex
- Region: South East
- Country: England
- Sovereign state: United Kingdom
- Post town: WORTHING
- Postcode district: BN13, BN14
- Dialling code: 01903
- Police: Sussex
- Fire: West Sussex
- Ambulance: South East Coast
- UK Parliament: Worthing West

West Tarring or simply Tarring (/ˈtærɪŋ/), is a neighbourhood of Worthing, in the borough of Worthing in West Sussex, England. It lies on the A2031 road 1 mile (1.6 km) north-west of the town centre. It is called "West Tarring", or less commonly "Tarring Peverell", to differentiate it from Tarring Neville near Lewes.

== History ==
Tarring was given by King Æthelstan of England to the archbishops of Canterbury in the 10th century. At the time of the Domesday Book in 1086, the village was known as Terringes, and consisted of 50 households. It is thought that the place name means "Teorra's people", with Teorra being a Saxon settler. There is a tradition that the village was visited by Thomas Becket, the martyred archbishop, in the 12th century and also by St Richard of Chichester, patron saint of Sussex, in the 13th century.

Section of a map from 1583 by the Dutch cartographer Joannes van Doetecum the Elder, showing Tarring and its surrounding area

Historically a parish, Tarring included outlying land at Marlpost in Horsham. Two ancient roads cross the parish, the Chichester-Brighton Roman road and the Broadwater-Littlehampton road, whose crossroads called Polltree was recorded in 1418.

From 1499 a market place was recorded in Tarring, at the junction of High Street (previously North Street), South Street and Church Road (previously West Street).

West Tarring is noted for its 13th-century parish church of St Andrew, 13th-century Archbishop's Palace, numerous old houses including the 15th-century timber-framed Parsonage Row, and two pubs: The Vine and the George and Dragon.

Despite Tarring High Street being relatively short and very narrow, it was once home to five pubs and was also a route for double-decker buses. Hence the George and Dragon has an unusually high pub sign. A lamp case bearing the legend Castle Inn is still present outside one of the former public houses.

West Tarring had an ancient fig garden dating from 1745 or earlier; it existed at least until 1950.

== Modern Tarring ==
West Tarring sub-post office was closed in 2004 and is now abandoned, it was previously a tea room. There are three other shops: Tarring news and wine, and a hairdresser, the cafe, Dukes, closed recently and will be opening as The Fig. The name was chosen because of the historic, much visited fig gardens which were once in the village. The cafe has been completely refurbished and under new management. The nearest railway station is West Worthing, 1 mi (1.6 km) away.

== Governance ==
Tarring lies within the borough of Worthing and mostly lies within Tarring ward, with part of the former parish within Gaisford ward. Each ward has three councillors that represent the area on Worthing Borough Council. For elections to West Sussex County Council most of the area is represented by the Tarring electoral division. Tarring ward is represented at Westminster by the Worthing West constituency, while Gaisford ward is represented by the East Worthing and Shoreham constituency.

In 1901 the civil parish had a population of 1720. On 9 November 1902 the parish was abolished and merged with Worthing, Durrington and Goring by Sea.

== Cinema ==
Part of the 2022 film My Policeman, starring Harry Styles and Emma Corrin was filmed at the Vine in Tarring High Street.

== Famous residents ==
- St Richard of Chichester (1197–1253), lived here for a time after 1244, with the parish priest, Simon, while his appointment as Bishop of Chichester was disputed.
- John Selden, polymath, was born here on 16 December 1584.
- Edward Henty, first permanent settler of Port Phillip District (later the Colony of Victoria), was born here in 1810
- James Henty, pioneer, merchant and politician in Australia, was born here on 24 September 1800.
- William Henty, who bowled the first ball in the first ever first-class cricket match in Australia, was born here on 23 September 1808.
- Stephen Henty, prominent on the Victorian Legislative Council in Australia, was born here on 3 November 1811.
- Horace Mitchell, first-class cricketer, was born here on 19 January 1858.
- Alan Martin (writer) (born 1966), co-creator and writer of the comic book Tank Girl, grew up here.
- Jason Lewry (born 1971), first-class cricketer, grew up here.

== Gallery ==
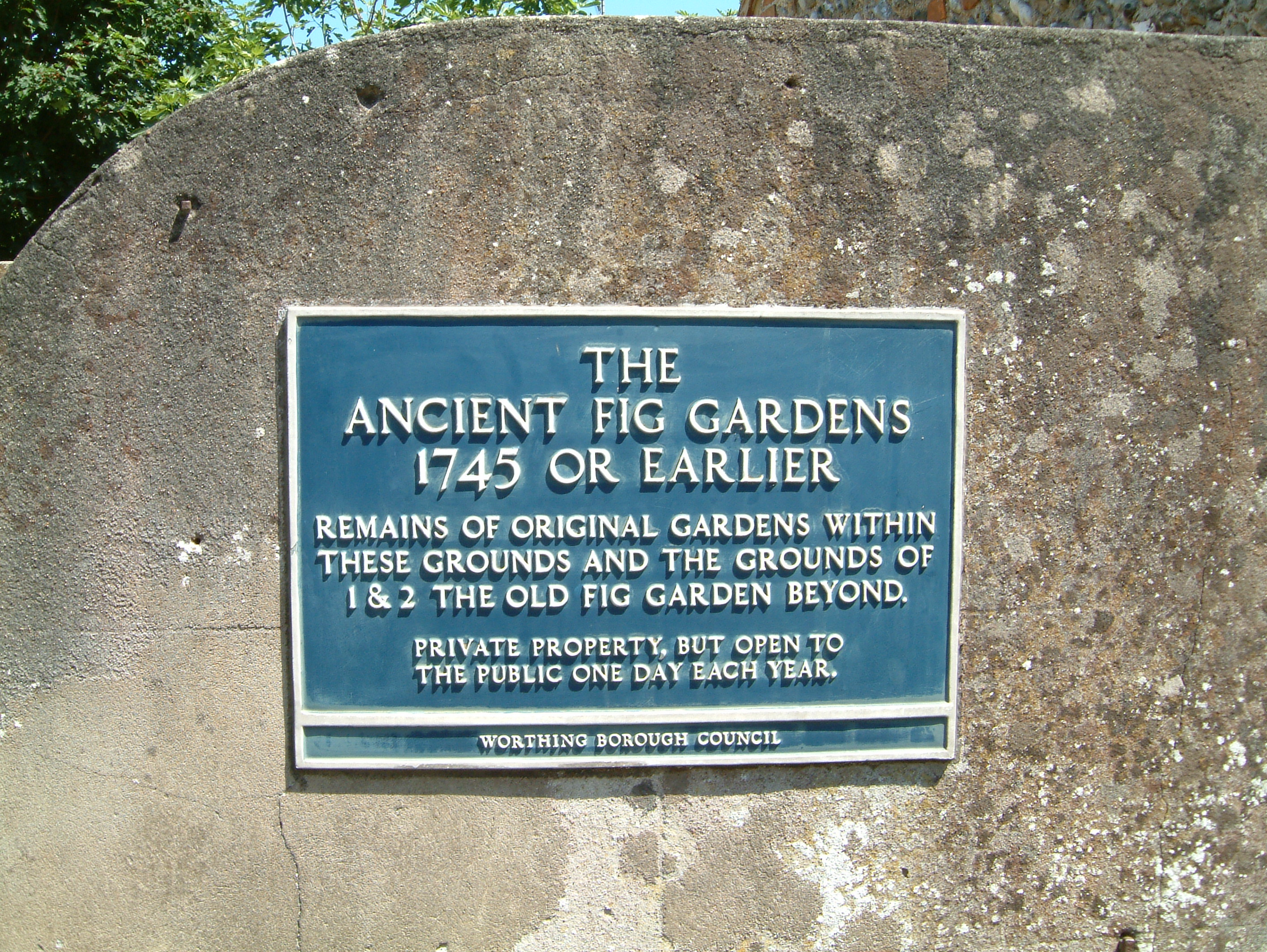
Fig Garden, Tarring
