= Kenneth Mathews (cricketer) =

English cricketer (1926–2024)

Personal information
- Full name: Kenneth Patrick Arthur Mathews
- Born: 10 May 1926; West Worthing, Sussex, England
- Died: 20 August 2024 (aged 98)
- Batting: Right-handed
- Bowling: Right-arm medium
- Relatives: John Mathews (father)

Domestic team information
- Years: Team
- 1955: Marylebone Cricket Club
- 1951: Cambridge University
- 1950–1951: Sussex

Career statistics
Competition	First-class
Matches	21
Runs scored	796
Batting average	27.44
100s/50s	–/4
Top score	77
Balls bowled	30
Wickets	–
Bowling average	–
5 wickets in innings	–
10 wickets in match	–
Best bowling	–
Catches/stumpings	7/–
- Source: Cricinfo, 22 July 2012

Kenneth Patrick Arthur Mathews (10 May 1926 – 20 August 2024) was an English cricketer. Mathews was a right-handed batsman who bowled right-arm medium pace. He was born at West Worthing, Sussex, and was educated at Felsted School.

== Biography ==
Mathews made his first-class debut for Sussex against Cambridge University in 1950. He made three further first-class appearances for the county in that season, against Surrey, Kent and Northamptonshire in the County Championship. He scored his maiden first-class half century against Kent, with a score of 51. The following season, while studying at Clare College, Cambridge, he played first-class cricket for Cambridge University, making his debut for the university against Lancashire at Fenner's. He made eleven further first-class appearances for the university in that season, the last of which came against Oxford University in The University Match at Lord's. He scored 540 runs in his twelve matches for the university, at an average of 25.71, with a high score of 77, which came against Surrey. He also played golf and field hockey for the university, gaining a Blue in each. Mathews also made two further first-class appearances in 1951, for Sussex in the County Championship against Northamptonshire and Hampshire.

In addition to his university studies at Cambridge, Mathews also studied at Yale University in the United States. Returning to England, he made further first-class appearances, in 1954 for the Free Foresters against Cambridge University, scoring 74 in the Free Foresters second-innings, as well as for the Marylebone Cricket Club against Cambridge University in 1955 and for the Free Foresters against the same opposition in 1956.

Mathews died on 20 August 2024, at the age of 98. His father, John, also played first-class cricket.
