= Transport in Worthing =

Worthing, a seaside town with borough status in the United Kingdom, is connected to the rest of the country by a network of major roads, a mainline railway, frequent bus and coach services and a nearby airport. Its 19th-century growth was encouraged by the development of turnpikes and stagecoach routes to London and nearby towns. By the middle of that century railway services improved journey times and conditions significantly. Suburbanisation in the 20th century was assisted by a network of bus routes.

== Road ==
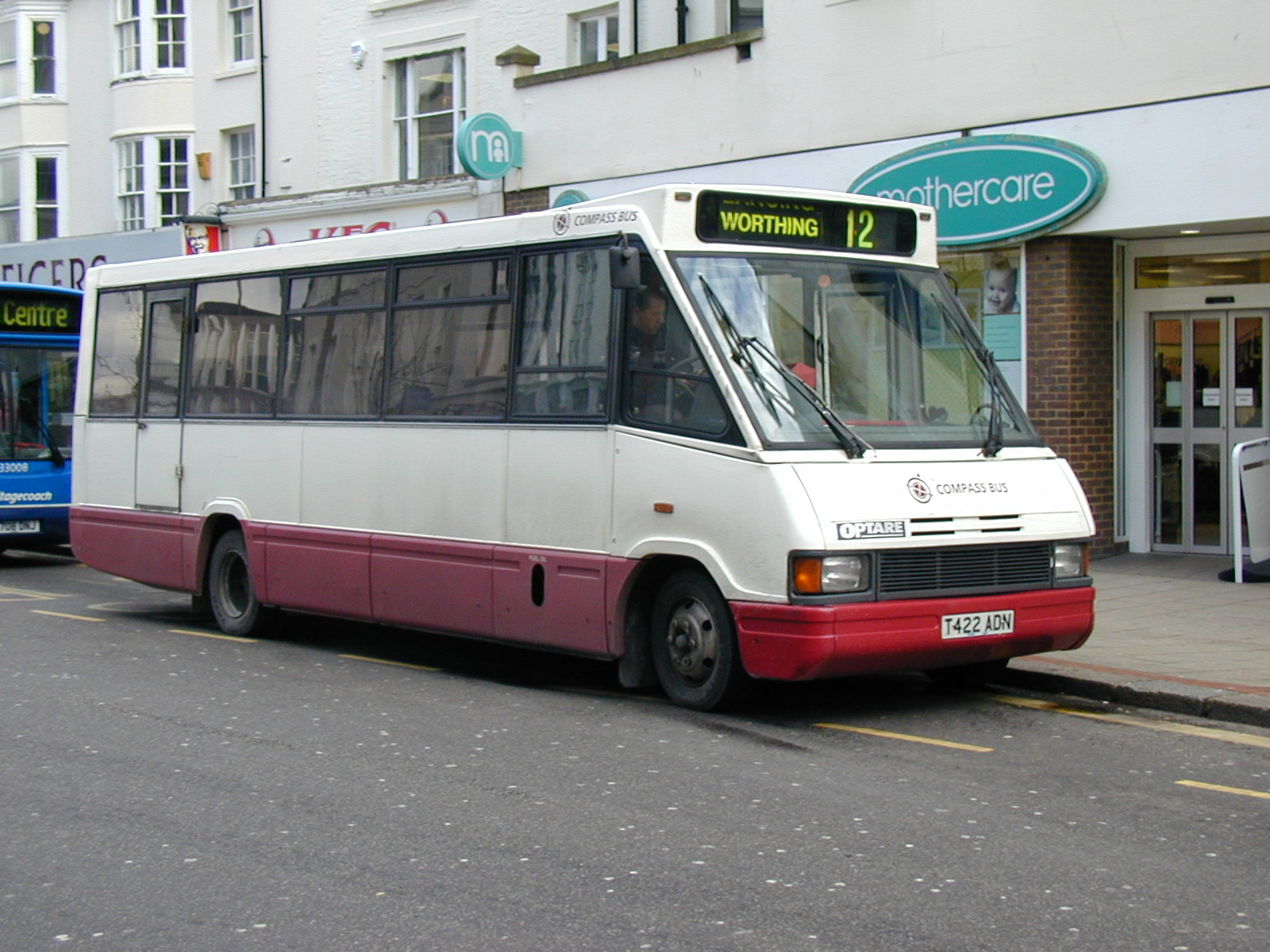
A Compass Travel service in Worthing town centre

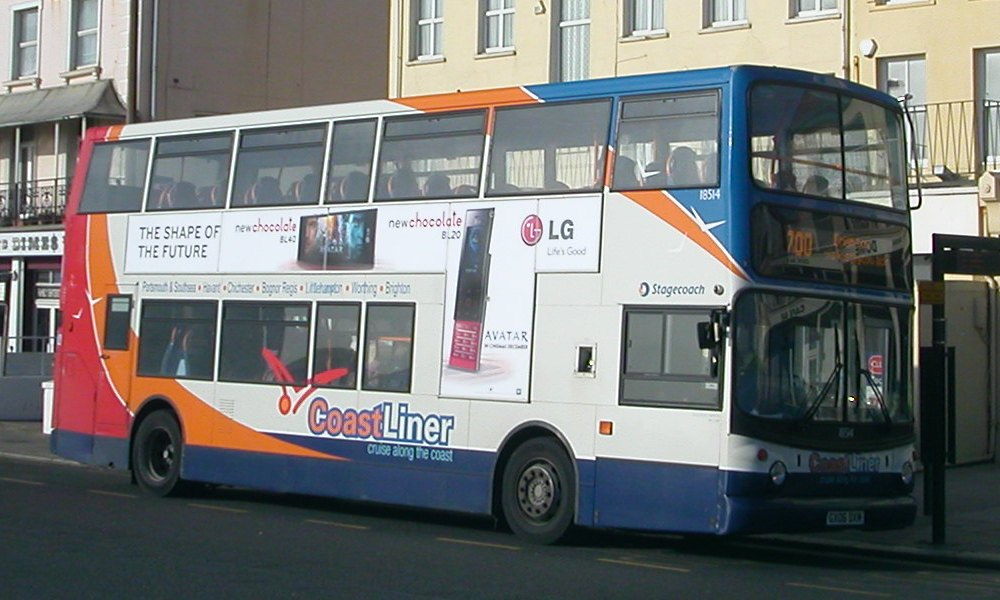
A Stagecoach in the South Downs bus on the Coastliner route 700

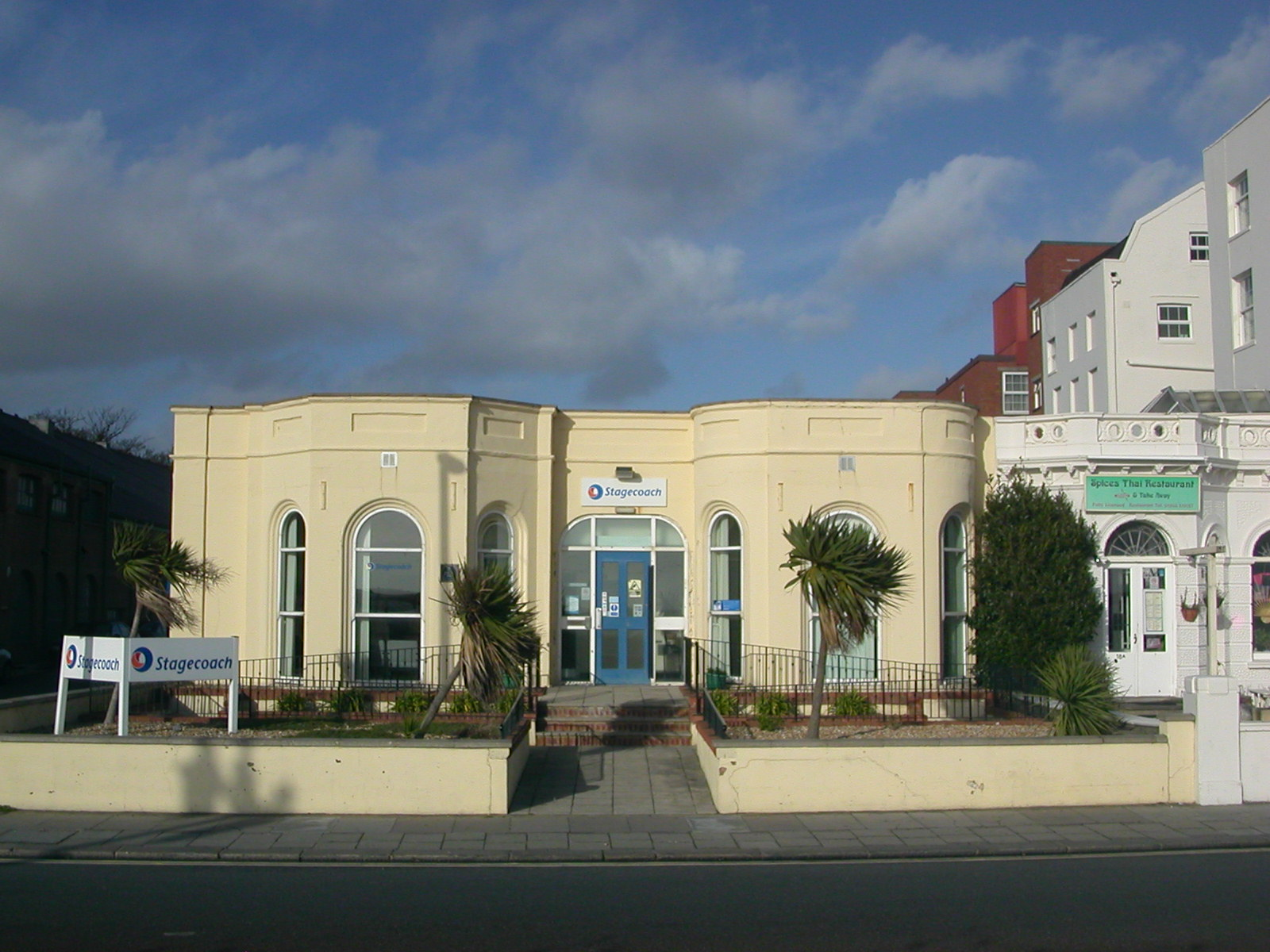
The Stagecoach in the South Downs office and bus depot on Marine Parade

Worthing is served by several major roads. The A24 runs to Horsham, Dorking, Leatherhead and London; the A27 serves Brighton and Portsmouth; and the A259 runs along the coast to Littlehampton, Chichester, Brighton, Hastings and Folkestone. The A27's predecessor was the Roman road between Chichester and Brighton. The present route, south of this ancient road, became established in the 17th century. The borough has a road network of more than 180 miles (290 km).

A turnpike was opened in 1803 to connect Worthing with London, and similar toll roads were built later in the 19th century to connect nearby villages. Stagecoach traffic grew rapidly until 1845, when the opening of a railway line from Brighton brought about an immediate decline. The former turnpike is now the A24, a primary route which runs northwards to London via Horsham and connects Worthing with the M25 motorway.

Worthing's remoteness from London and the major roads and coach routes of Sussex was alleviated in 1803, when a turnpike was opened between the seafront and West Grinstead via Findon. A tollgate stood near the present Teville Gate shopping centre between 1804 and 1845. Other tollgates in Goring, Heene and East Worthing served later turnpikes in those areas.

Until 1803, the nearest boarding point for stagecoaches was Steyning, but coaches ran regularly to London soon after the turnpike opened. The initial service of three per week in summer only was upgraded to a daily service all year, leaving at 7.00am. The journey took about seven hours and cost 11/- (£50 as of 2025) for an uncovered seat. Coaches also ran to Brighton and Arundel, and by 1832 there were 24 departures and arrivals daily, serving destinations all over the south of England.

James Town, who was closely involved with the early-19th-century coaching industry, became Worthing's leading horse-drawn omnibus operator in the late 19th century, after the success of the railway caused coaching to decline. Other businessmen provided competition, and by 1900 horse-drawn omnibuses served all parts of the town. From 1904, motorised buses superseded these: the Sussex Motor Road Car Company and its successor the Worthing Motor Omnibus Company ran local and long-distance from garages near the railway station. By 1909, Worthing Motor Services Ltd had formed; their fleet was 15 strong. Southdown Motor Services, formed in 1915 and later nationalised, survived with that identity until deregulation in 1986, after which Stagecoach Group acquired its routes and fleet.

An experimental "tramocar" service was started in 1924. This used small single-decker vehicles manufactured by Shelvoke and Drewry. The first tramocars had solid wheels, open sides and a tiller instead of a conventional steering wheel; later models were fully enclosed and had pneumatic tyres. The initial service along the promenade was provided by two vehicles, but by the time Southdown Motor Services took over Tramocars Ltd's operations in 1938 there were 15 tramocars and a network of routes across Worthing. The last vehicle was withdrawn from service in 1942.

A bureaucratic oversight meant that the borough council passed a bill to allow the development of a tramway network in Worthing. Between 1901 and 1903, The British Electric Traction Company sought permission to open tram routes between Hove, Worthing and Littlehampton. The council passed a bill to prevent this by ensuring that only they could authorise such a development, although they had no intention of doing so. The bill was never repealed.

In the early 21st century longer-distance routes to Midhurst, Brighton and Portsmouth, were run by Stagecoach's South Downs division. Metrobus operated a route to Crawley. Other bus operators in the area included Worthing-based Compass Travel, Brighton & Hove Bus and Coach Company and Worthing Coaches, a division of haulage and travel company Lucketts Travel Group. Day trips and longer holidays by coach, and private hire of vehicles, are offered.

== Rail ==
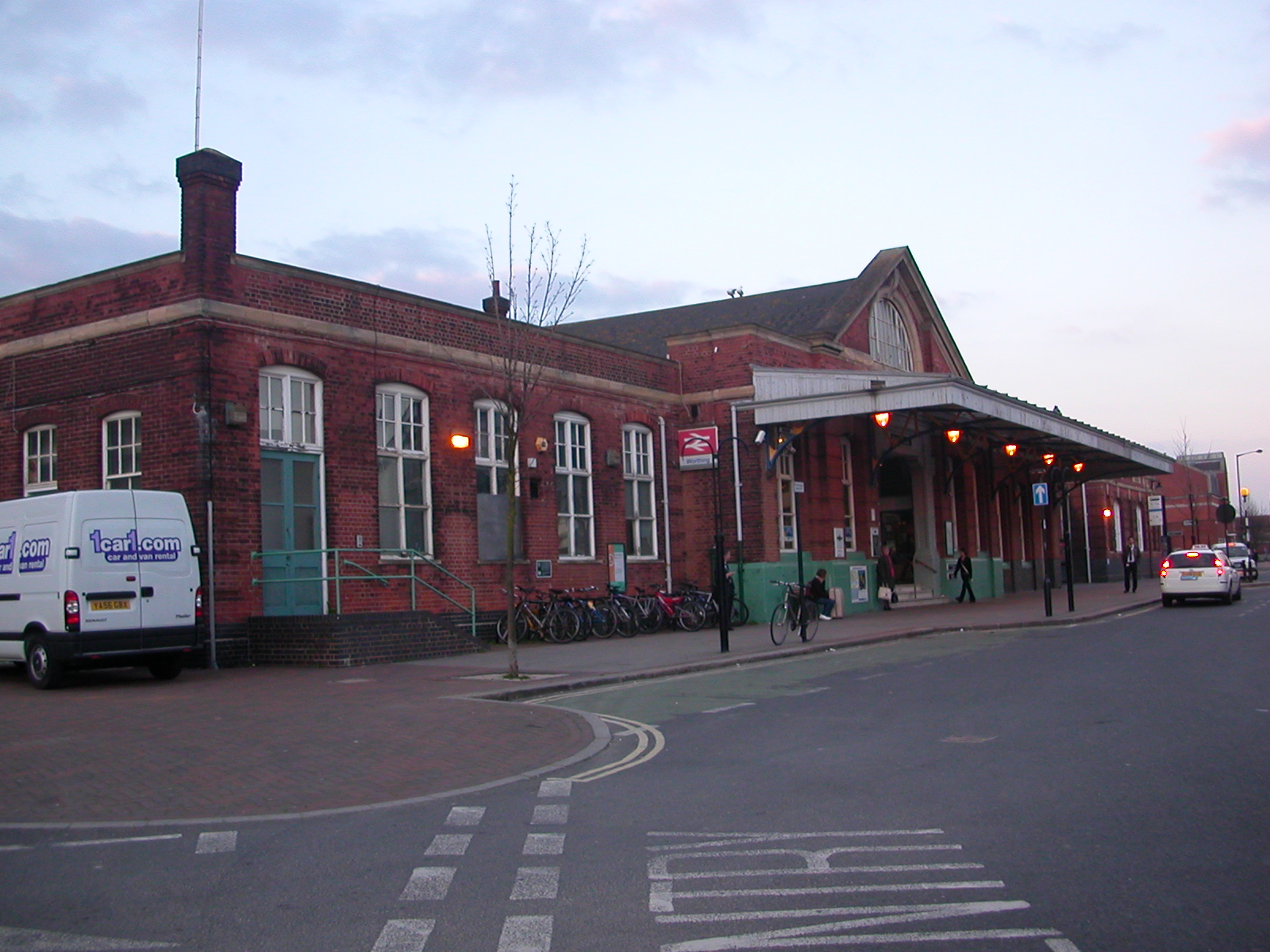
The 1909 buildings at Worthing railway station

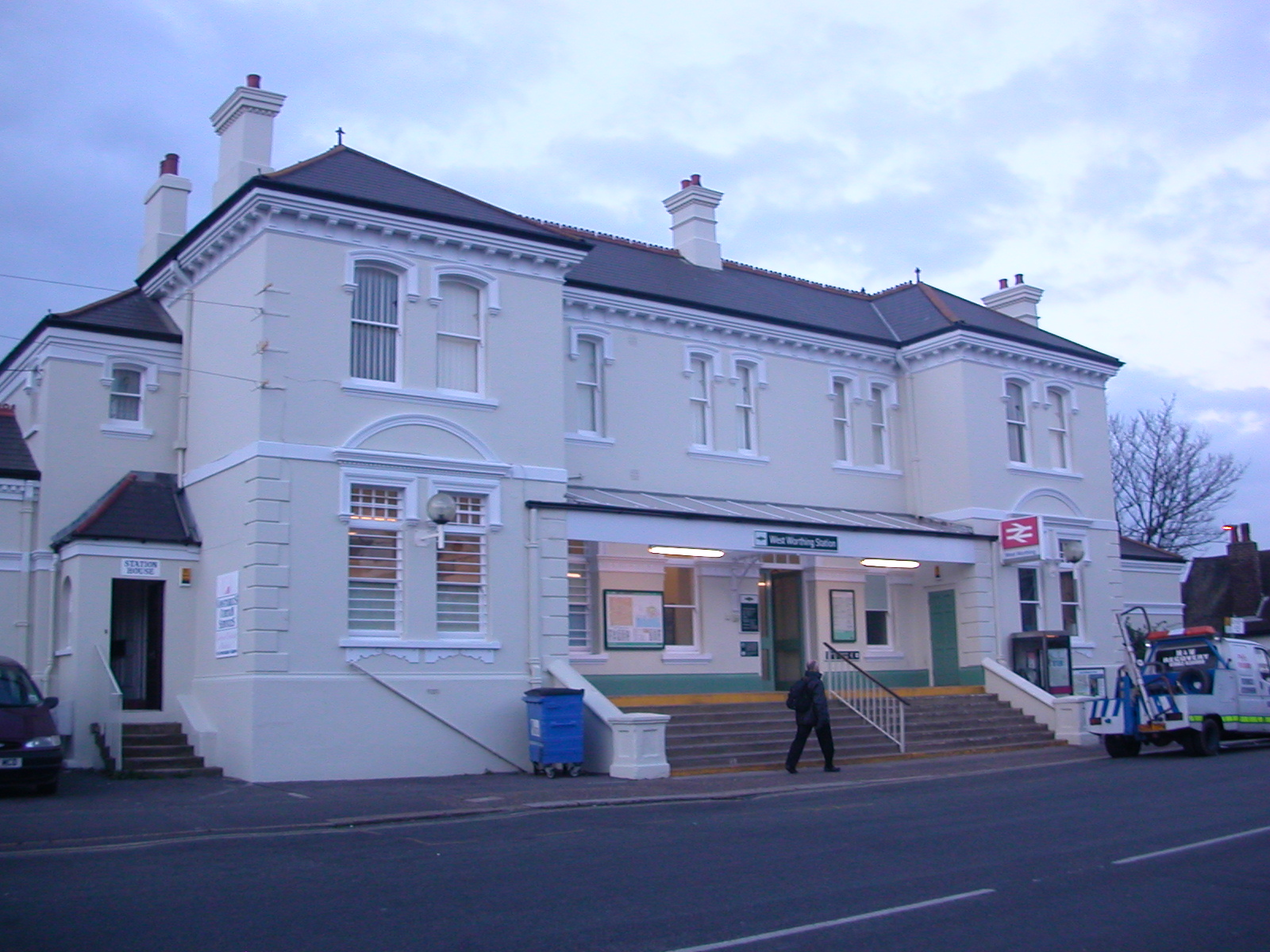
West Worthing's Italianate station building

The borough of Worthing has five railway stations. From east to west, these are East Worthing, Worthing, West Worthing, Durrington-on-Sea and Goring-by-Sea. All are on the West Coastway Line, which takes a straight east–west route through the area, and all are managed and operated by the Southern train operating company.

East Worthing opened in September 1905 as Ham Bridge Halt and was renamed in 1949. It retained a ticket office until the 1990s, but is now unstaffed. The town's main station, Worthing (formerly Worthing Central), is 0.9 miles (1.4 km) west. It was opened on 24 November 1845, but the present structure dates from 1909. The old station building, further east, was preserved and is now listed at Grade II. West Worthing station, a further 0.8 miles (1.3 km) on, opened in 1889 to serve new residential development north of Heene. The main building is Italianate. Before Durrington-on-Sea, another 0.8 miles (1.3 km) west, are train carriage stabling facilities, sheds and sidings. Durrington-on-Sea, which was almost renamed Field Place in 1947 in reference to an 18th-century house nearby, opened in 1937. Goring-by-Sea is 0.9 miles (1.4 km) further west and dates from 1846. All stations have frequent daily services provided by Southern, to destinations such as London, Croydon, Gatwick Airport, Brighton, Chichester, Portsmouth and Southampton. Worthing station also receives occasional long-distance trains operated by Great Western Railway.

Rail travel became quicker and more convenient from 1 January 1933, when the route between West Worthing and Brighton was electrified. Electric trains reached Durrington and Goring in 1938. Freight traffic has declined in importance, but Worthing, West Worthing and Goring had goods yards until the 1960s; West Worthing's supported the town's market gardening industry for many years.

There are plans for Worthing to have a direct hourly link to the international station at London St Pancras and on to Cambridge as part of the £5 billion Thameslink Programme. Originally envisaged to be completed in 2000, the project is now provisionally scheduled to be completed in 2015.

== Cycle ==
Worthing is on National Cycle Network Route 2, which will run along the English Channel coast from Dover in Kent to St Austell in Cornwall. As of 2009, it is incomplete and does not run west of the town. The section from Brighton is partly traffic-free and follows the coast for most of its length.

In August 2009, local byelaws were changed to support a year-long trial allowing cyclists to use a section of the seafront promenade. Public consultation suggested that residents were generally in favour of the scheme, but the absence of a speed limit and the lack of segregation between pedestrians and cyclists proved controversial.

== Air ==
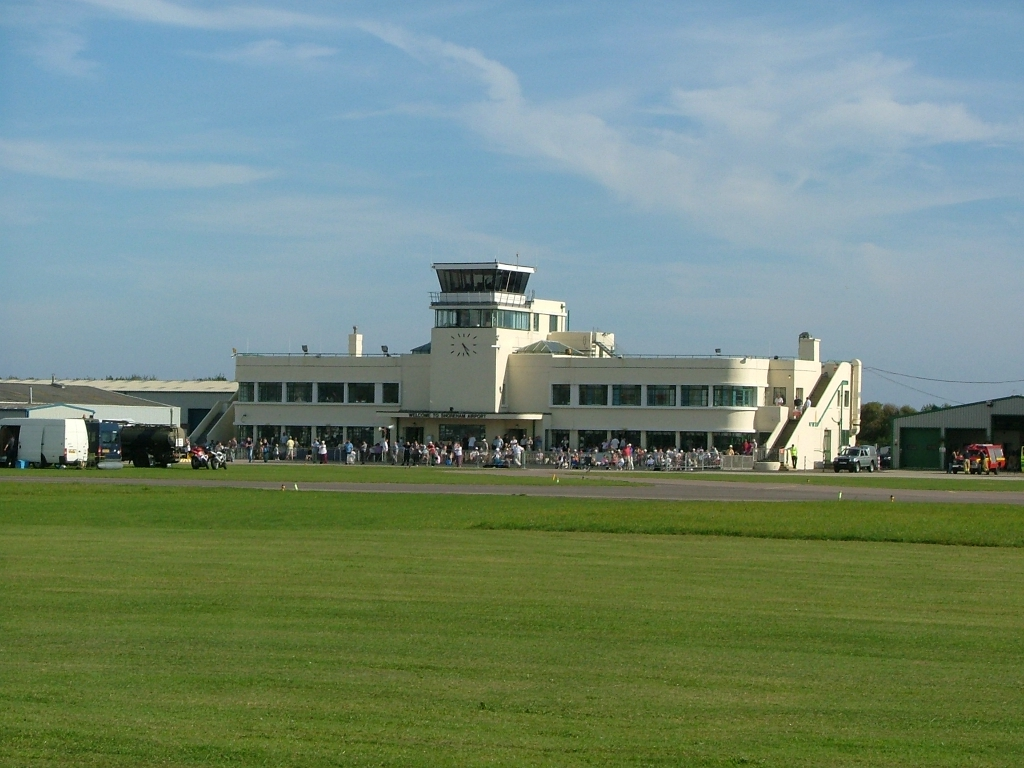
Shoreham Airport is the closest airport to Worthing.

The closest airport to Worthing for light aircraft is Shoreham Airport, about 5 miles (8.0 km) to the east in the district of Adur. It was the first licensed airfield in Britain when it opened in 1911. In 1933 it was bought by a committee, redesignated the Brighton, Hove and Worthing Municipal Airport, and opened under this name on 13 June 1936. London Gatwick Airport is about 28 miles (45 km) away. Seaplanes often took off from Worthing beach in the early 20th century.
