= James Arnold (cricketer) =

English cricketer

Personal information
- Full name: James Frederick Arnold
- Born: 2 March 1869; Withington, Manchester, England
- Died: 26 March 1944 (aged 75); West Worthing, Sussex, England
- Batting: Right-handed

Domestic team information
- Years: Team
- 1896: Lancashire
- First-class debut: 28 May 1896 Lancashire v Australians
- Last First-class: 8 June 1896 Lancashire v Derbyshire

Career statistics
Competition	First-class
Matches	3
Runs scored	94
Batting average	18.80
100s/50s	0/0
Top score	37
Balls bowled	0
Wickets	0
Bowling average	0
5 wickets in innings	0
10 wickets in match	0
Best bowling	N/A
Catches/stumpings	2/–
- Source: CricketArchive, 26 November 2009

James Frederick Arnold (2 March 1869 – 26 March 1944) was an English cricketer who played three first-class matches for Lancashire County Cricket Club in the 1896 season.
