= Herbert Manners =

English cricketer

Personal information
- Full name: Herbert Cecil Manners
- Born: 16 April 1877; Hartley Wintney, Hampshire, England
- Died: 30 December 1955 (aged 78); West Worthing, Sussex, England
- Batting: Right-handed
- Role: Occasional wicket-keeper

Domestic team information
- Years: Team
- 1902–1911: Gloucestershire

Career statistics
Competition	First-class
Matches	5
Runs scored	60
Batting average	7.50
100s/50s	–/–
Top score	32
Balls bowled	–
Wickets	–
Bowling average	–
5 wickets in innings	–
10 wickets in match	–
Best bowling	–
Catches/stumpings	1/–
- Source: Cricinfo, 31 March 2012

Herbert Cecil Manners (16 August 1877 – 30 December 1955) was an English cricketer. Manners was a right-handed batsman who fielded occasionally as a wicket-keeper. He was born in Hartley Wintney, Hampshire, and educated at Cheltenham College.

Manners made his first-class debut for Gloucestershire against Warwickshire in 1902 County Championship. He made two further first-class appearances for the county in that season, against Worcestershire and Somerset, while the following season he played once against the touring Gentlemen of Philadelphia. A fifth and final first-class appearance later came for the county in 1911, against Cambridge University. In his five first-class matches for Gloucestershire, he scored a total of 60 runs at an average of 7.50, with a high score of 32.

He died in West Worthing, Sussex, on 30 December 1955.
