= Worthing Tramocars =

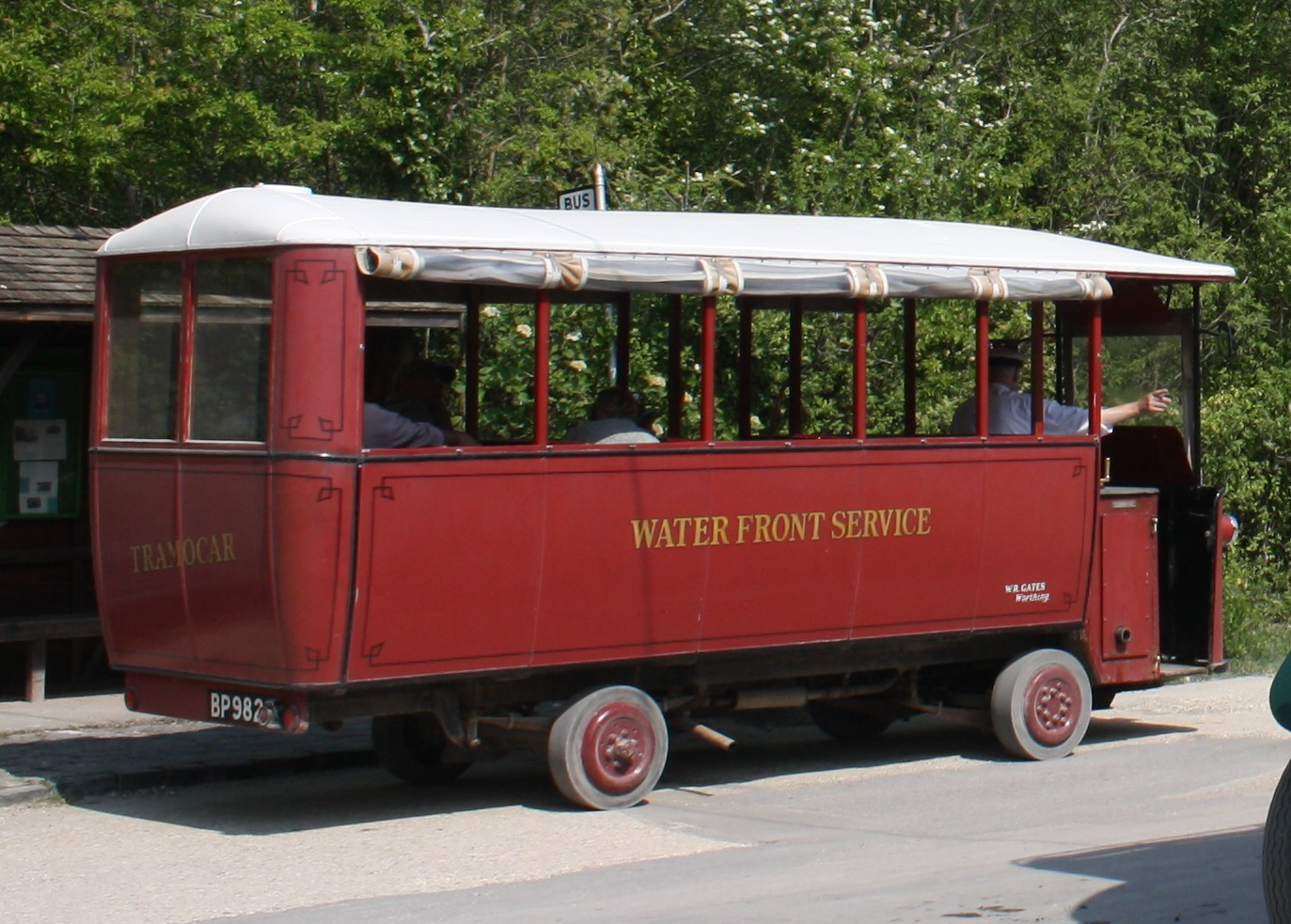
The replica Worthing Tramocar, BP 9822, at the Amberley Museum & Heritage Centre in 2011

The Worthing Tramocars formed part of the public transport network in Worthing, a seaside resort in West Sussex, England, during the 1920s and 1930s. The vehicles were converted dustbin lorries manufactured by Shelvoke and Drewry and adapted for use by elderly people. "The service was the brainchild" of Bill W. R. Gates, a businessman who had made his fortune in New Zealand before returning to his native England. He registered the name Tramocar as a trademark and procured and converted 13 vehicles for use on various routes around the town. Tramocar services ran from 1924 until 1942—latterly operated by bus company Southdown Motor Services, which introduced a further two Tramocars—but a replica vehicle is still operational at a museum in West Sussex.

== Background ==
Until the late 18th century Worthing was a "small and primitive settlement" in the parish of Broadwater, consisting of a manor house, modest housing for fishermen, common land and some fields. The development of nearby Brighton as a fashionable resort encouraged slow growth, helped in 1804 by the opening of a turnpike which connected the village to London and other parts of Sussex. Growth continued throughout the 19th century as Worthing became popular with convalescents and retired people. Borough status was granted in 1890, by which time the population was nearly 15,000. By the early 20th century, public transport consisted of railway services to Brighton, London and nearby towns, and buses (successively horse-drawn, steam-powered and petrol-driven) to Brighton and within the town. The Worthing Motor Omnibus Company was founded in 1904 to provide competition with horse-drawn vehicles.

== The Shelvoke and Drewry Freighter ==
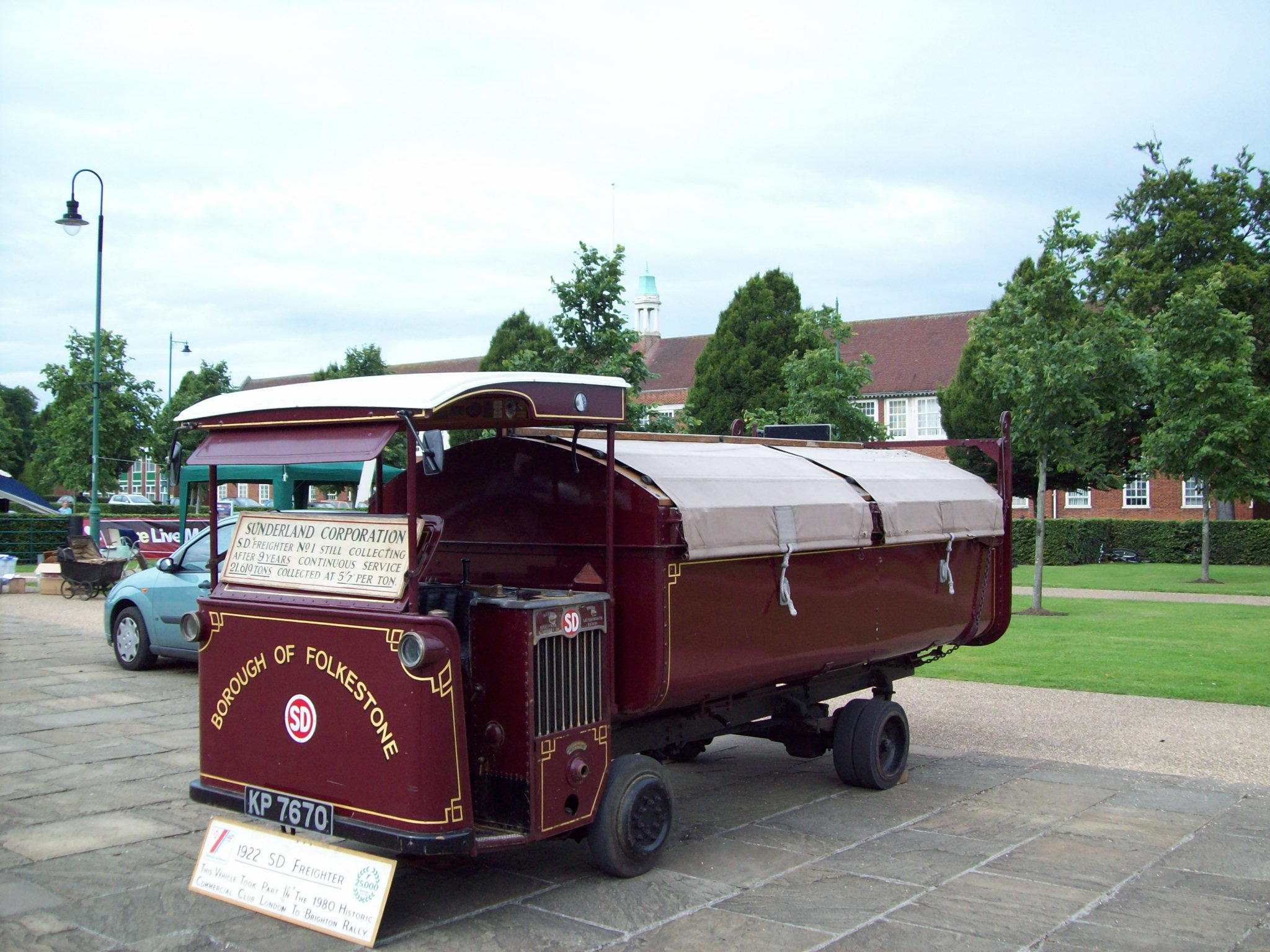
Many Shelvoke and Drewry Freighters were used for waste collection, as in this example.

In September 1923, in response to demand for a vehicle able to carry heavy and bulky loads without requiring lifting gear, the specialist commercial vehicle design and manufacturing company Shelvoke and Drewry of Letchworth, Hertfordshire introduced the "Freighter" (or "S.D. Freighter"). This was a small but high-capacity lorry with an unusually low loading height—23 inches (58 cm) above the ground—and a "remarkably small" turning circle of 15 feet (4.6 m), giving it flexibility and manoeuvrability. It was also easy to control, as all braking, acceleration and gear change actions were undertaken using a multi-function handle similar to those found in trams. A tiller served to steer the vehicle. The handle would not operate without a safety pedal being depressed, and there was also an emergency footbrake. The vehicle was an "instant success", and about 2,500 were produced in the 15 years to 1938. Although suitable for various functions, the Freighter was "primarily built for municipal use as a dustcart". Several municipal transport operators also put them to use in the construction of tramways, where they were well suited to carrying lengths of rail and other construction materials. Shelvoke and Drewry envisaged the Freighter as a lorry: it was "not really intended for the passenger carrying market".

== Bill Gates ==
Bill (W.R.) Gates was born in London in 1883 or 1884. After travelling extensively, including to New Zealand where he owned a business, he moved to Worthing in the early 1920s and lived at 141 Brighton Road, the main seafront road and a busy bus route. He regularly noticed elderly people struggling to get on and off the high-stepped Southdown Motor Services motor buses in use at the time. Deciding there was a gap in the market for this need and for a new route running along the whole seafront from East Worthing to West Worthing, he ordered two S.D. Freighters and commissioned a London-based coachbuilder to convert them from dustbin lorries into buses. The body was designed around the characteristics of the chassis, with its transverse-mounted front engine, short wheelbase, small solid wheels and even weight distribution across both axles. Behind the front wheel, two shallow steps with handrails led to an interior with a centre aisle flanked by five rows of paired seats and four single seats on the door side, with four seats across the rear giving a total capacity of 18 passengers. The wide, deep seat cushions were designed to be "of maximum comfort" to elderly people. The sides were partly open, but fabric blinds offered some protection from the weather; the rear opening was glazed.

== Introduction of Tramocar services ==
On 8 January 1924, Bill Gates applied to Worthing Borough Council for a licence to operate one converted S.D. Freighter on a route between Worthing Pier and Sea View Road to the west. The application was granted in April 1924. He registered the name "Tramocar" as a trademark, and at Easter 1924 the first Worthing Tramocar service ran on its route along the seafront. The event was reported in the Worthing Herald newspaper, which illustrated the vehicle. By early June 1924 a second vehicle was delivered by the coachbuilders, and the service level was doubled with effect from 9 June. On that Whit Monday, one of the drivers estimated he had carried 1,200 passengers, each paying a 2d. single fare. Bill Gates sometimes drove the vehicles as well. Meanwhile, he established a garage on Wordsworth Road where the drivers would perform maintenance on the Tramocars on Sundays, when no services ran. The solid tyres needed regular skimming to maintain their shape, which was done by a local engineering company.

A third vehicle entered the fleet in October 1924, followed by others in March 1925 and July 1927. Battery-powered lamps were used instead of the oil lamps fitted on the first vehicles. A bigger change took place in 1930, when three new vehicles were added to the fleet. These had larger wheels with pneumatic tyres, giving a better ride quality and a higher top speed of 25 miles per hour (40 km/h) at the expense of the low floor level: the entrance had to be placed higher and the steps were made steeper, "to the dismay of [the elderly] as they had become used to the lower floor level of the earlier models". The original 1924 vehicles were sold as surplus to requirements in 1934 to Jersey's municipal bus operator. The introduction of the new vehicles, which were also fully enclosed, allowed the initial "Waterfront service" to be expanded to new routes. Their original "rather unappealing" appearance was also improved. From the third vehicle onwards, the body was modified to put the entrance at the rear, and two extra seats were added. From June 1933, an improved version of the Shelvoke and Drewry chassis was combined with a "handsome-looking 26-seater body" designed by Thomas Harrington Coachbuilders, one of the largest companies in nearby Hove and a major producer of bus bodies. The final new vehicles delivered under Bill Gates's ownership of the company arrived in 1934 and had conventional steering, as tiller steering mechanisms were now illegal on new vehicles.

== Southdown ownership ==
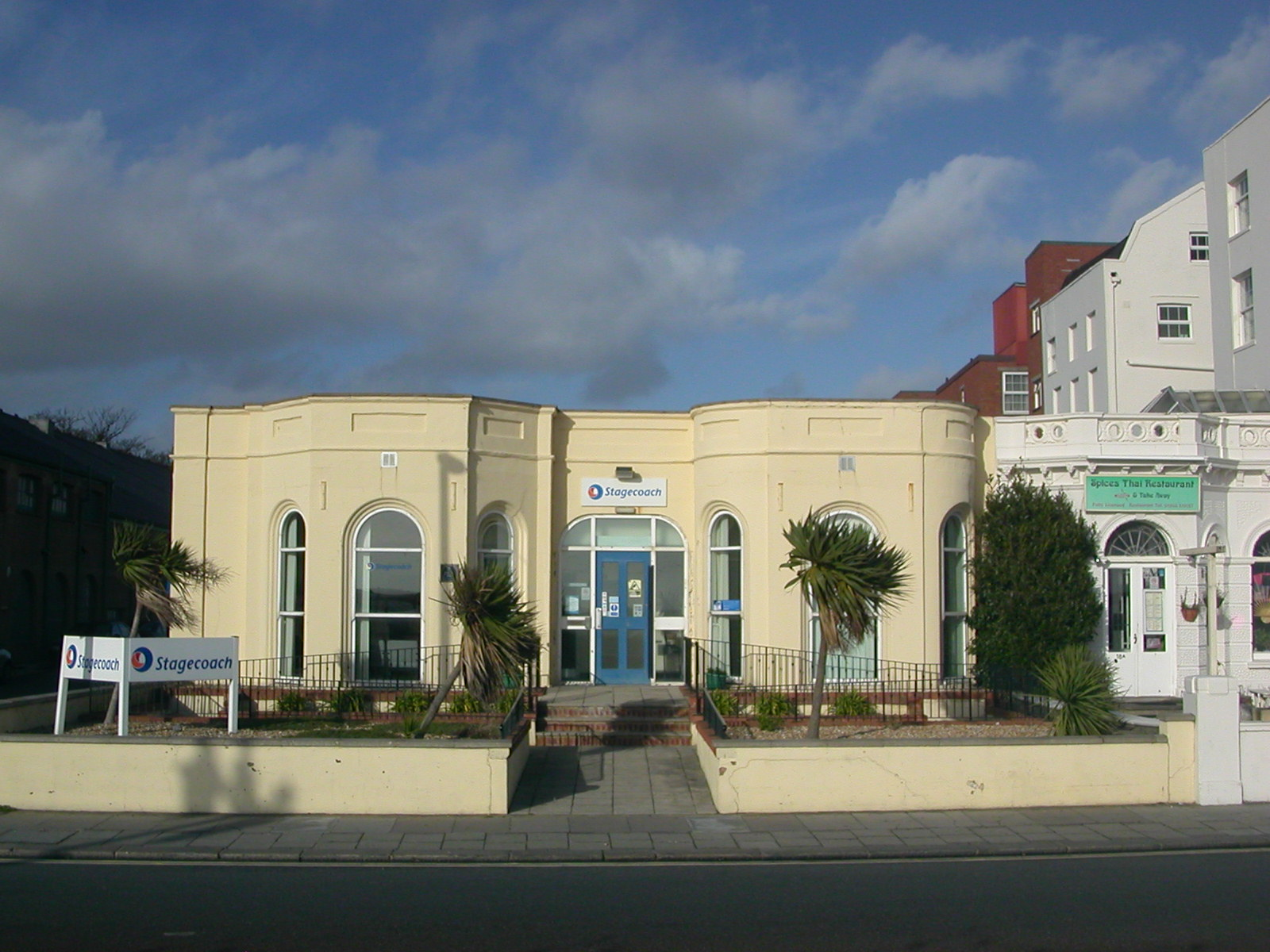
Southdown moved the Tramocars to their depot on the seafront.

Southdown Motor Services had formed in 1915, absorbing the former Worthing Motor Omnibus Company and two others, and by 1921 operated six bus routes using conventional vehicles. Their headquarters was in central Worthing, although they operated across Sussex. On 1 April 1938 Southdown bought Tramocars Ltd from Bill Gates, who had been given medical advice to reduce his activities. The limited company was formed in 1932 with Gates and his wife as sole directors and shareholders. It had been consistently profitable, and Southdown paid £15,750 for the shares. The original garage was closed and vehicles were stabled at the Southdown garage on the seafront. In July 1938 Southdown withdrew two of the older vehicles and replaced them with the final new Tramocars: these were of "a very advanced" design with an overhauled chassis, a rear engine and a newly designed 26-seater body (again by Thomas Harrington Coachbuilders) with a central entrance. The floor was now even higher, negating Bill Gates's original concept for a vehicle "specially designed for the elderly". The red and gold livery used on all the pre-Southdown Tramocars was also replaced with Southdown's cream and green house colours on these new vehicles, although no others were repainted until May 1939.

Also in 1939, Southdown began to replace Tramocars with conventional single-deck buses such as Dennis Falcons and Leyland Tigers. The three oldest Tramocars were sold in 1938, another went in 1940, two more were sold to a vehicle dealer in 1941 and the last seven vehicles in the fleet were disposed of in July 1942. More Leyland Tigers had superseded them, and wartime reductions in services (particularly in April 1941) reduced the peak vehicle requirement.

== Routes and services ==
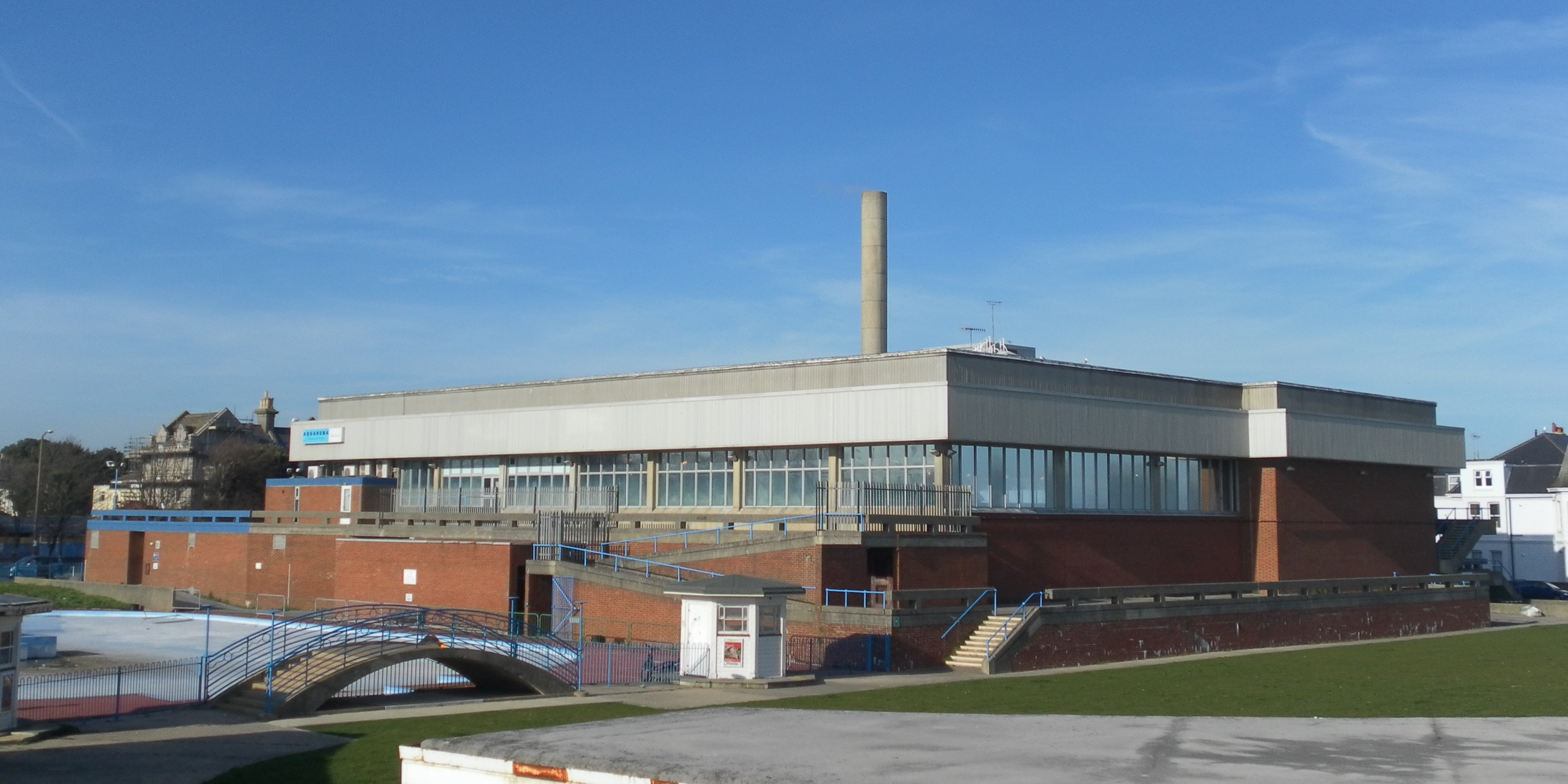
The eastern terminus of Tramocar services was Splash Point, an open air swimming pool (left of picture) on Brighton Road.

The first Tramocar service ran on 21 April 1924 along Worthing seafront from the pier to Sea View Road, just short of Grand Avenue—the main road of West Worthing, laid out in the 1870s. The eastern terminus was soon extended to Splash Point, an outdoor swimming pool and leisure centre, as originally proposed in the licence application. The success of this experimental service, and the demands of residents in the Grand Avenue area (which was poorly served by Southdown), led him to order a second vehicle and seek permission to extend the route along Grand Avenue to West Worthing railway station. After the third and fourth vehicles were acquired, Gates applied successfully to increase the service frequency to every 10 minutes. A special late-evening express service from Worthing Pier, with a higher fare of 3d., was authorised in March 1926, and Sunday services were also operated during that summer.

Gates's next applications for route extensions were unsuccessful as they were thought to impinge on Southdown routes, but in 1930 a new service was given permission. This was operated separately from the original route, and the two routes each had a 20-minute frequency. After West Worthing station, the second route ran back towards the town centre, passing the central library and main post office before turning there and returning via the same streets. This was almost a circular service, and Gates applied unsuccessfully to extend the route from the post office to the pier and Splash Point along the central shopping streets (Chapel Road and South Street).

After requests by shopkeepers in Rowlands Road, another major shopping street, Gates diverted one route to run along there in 1934. At the same time both routes were upgraded to a 15-minute frequency. No further route extensions were made, although Gates had unfulfilled ambitions of serving the new housing in the rapidly developing Goring-by-Sea area. Both routes were reduced in 1935: route 1 had its frequency cut to one bus every 10 minutes, and route 2 now terminated at West Worthing station and no longer continued to the central library and post office (only route 1 now served this section). After Southdown took over in 1938, the routes were renumbered twice before being merged into a single route.

== Postwar events ==
The last link to the "interesting event in the history of Worthing's public transport" was removed in February 1946 when the former Tramocar route 1, by then renumbered 11, was rerouted. Nevertheless, many older residents still referred to the replacement Leyland buses as "Tramocars" throughout the 1950s, reflecting the 18-year history of Gates's vehicles in the town and the popularity among elderly residents of the service, with its "unorthodox" and "quaint little vehicles", and comfortable interiors. After selling his business to Southdown, Gates retired and returned to New Zealand for some time before moving back to Worthing, where he died in 1947.

The former Tramocars had various fates. The original two vehicles were sold for use in Jersey in 1934. The fourth was bought by a laundry in nearby Portslade in 1938. A few months later, a vehicle dealer in Middlesex bought the third and fifth. Numbers 6 and 7 both ended up abandoned in Sussex (at Shoreham Airport and on a caravan site respectively), despite being sold to a vehicle broker in London. Brighton Corporation bought number 8 and converted it into a mobile canteen and, of the seven remaining Tramocars sold by Southdown in July 1942, four were used in Staffordshire as transport for wartime munitions workers. The status of the other three is unknown.

A 1920s Shelvoke & Drewry freighter chassis was acquired by preservationists in the 1990s and was used to build a replica Worthing Tramocar. The chassis belonged to a municipal dustbin lorry built for the city of Truro in Cornwall. The replica was built at the Amberley Museum & Heritage Centre, where it is housed as an exhibit and gives rides around the site. It bears the registration number BP 9822, the number of the first Tramocar in the fleet. In July 1997, it was driven from the museum to Worthing where it was one of the attractions of a five-day fair on the seafront. After visiting the original garage on Wordsworth Road, which still survives, it ran along the original seafront route and beyond. The service was open to the public and "carried a full load on virtually every trip".

== Bibliography ==
- Elleray, D. Robert (1977). Worthing: a Pictorial History. Chichester: Phillimore & Co. ISBN 0-85033-263-X.
- Elleray, D. Robert (1998). A Millennium Encyclopaedia of Worthing History. Worthing: Optimus Books. ISBN 0-9533132-0-4.
- Middleton, Judy (2002). The Encyclopaedia of Hove & Portslade. Brighton: Brighton & Hove Libraries.
- s. n. (2002). An Anthology of the Worthing Tramocars. Crowborough: Southdown Enthusiasts Club.
