= West Worthing =

Neighbourhood in West Sussex, England

Coordinates: 50.81338°N 0.3852°W

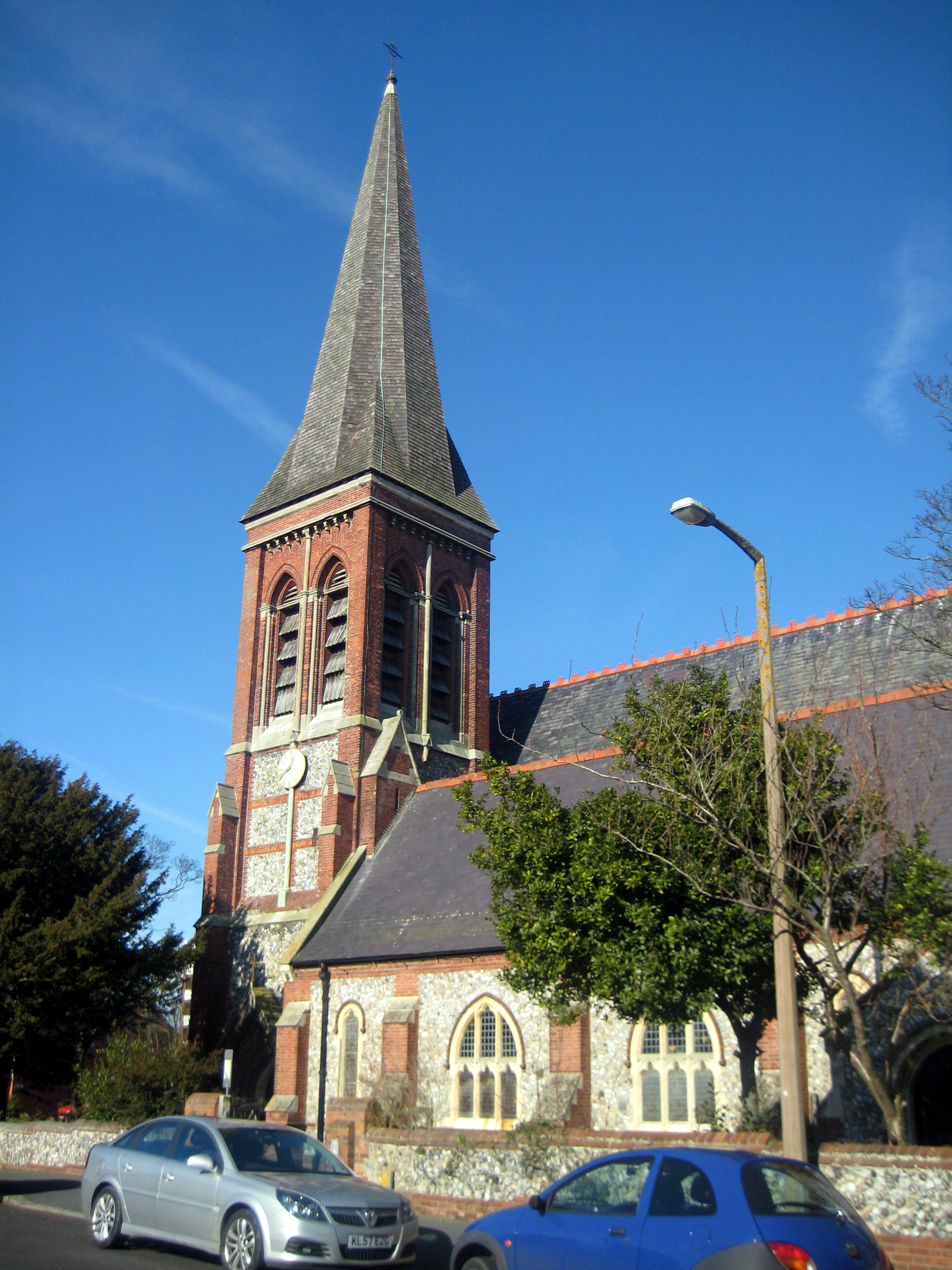
- St Botolph's Church

- Location within West Sussex
- Population: 7,859 (2011.Ward)
- OS grid reference: TQ138027
- District: Worthing
- Shire county: West Sussex
- Region: South East
- Country: England
- Sovereign state: United Kingdom
- Post town: Worthing
- Postcode district: BN11 0
- Police: Sussex
- Fire: West Sussex
- Ambulance: South East Coast
- UK Parliament: Worthing West

West Worthing is a neighbourhood of Worthing in West Sussex, England that was developed within Heene and later expanded beyond Heene's boundaries. Intended as an exclusive resort, the township of West Worthing was developed from around 1864 and merged with the formerly separate township of Worthing in 1890, when Worthing gained borough status.

Heene is a former civil parish, now part of the borough of Worthing. It lies on the A259 road 0.6 miles (1 km) west of the town centre. Once part of the parish of West Tarring, Heene was a civil parish in its own right from the 16th century until 9 November 1902. At the 1901 census (the last before the abolition of the parish), Heene had a population of 3019.

== Etymology ==
Heene comes from the word hīun or hīwun meaning family or household.

== Geography ==
The borders of the former civil parish of Heene are defined by the Teville Stream and Tarring Road to the north and Elm Grove and Wallace Avenue (once known as Sea Lane) to the west. West Worthing encompasses this area and extends west to the boundary with Goring at George V Avenue.

== History ==
During the English Civil War in January 1644, the Spanish warship the Santiago (St James) was beached at Heene. The ship had several Royalist officers on board, as well as 24 brass guns, 2,000 arms and 100 barrels of gunpowder and a large cargo of linen. The ship had set sail from the port of Dunkirk, at the time part of the Spanish Empire, having been pursued by Dutch men of war and to avoid capture seems to have tried to head for either Shoreham or Arundel. The ship was seized by the Parliamentarian William Waller and its contents taken to be securely stored at Arundel Castle.

In the 1670s, three streets in Heene are mentioned - East Street, West Street and High Street (today's Heene Road).

As with other parts of Worthing, the coastline of Heene has changed greatly in recent centuries. The sea is thought to have encroached some 55 yards (50 m) in the century up to 1875. In the early 19th century, the area along the coast known as Heene Common was made up of rough pasture intersected by watercourses and covered with gorse.

In the early 19th century settlement was in Heene village and in an area known as Little Heene in Brunswick Road. The area had a reputation for wildness and lawlessness at the time. Edward Ogle (known locally as 'King' Ogle) and other Commissioners in the new town of Worthing to the east erected a wall at the Heene-Worthing boundary to keep the 'lawless' of Heene out of the civilised east.

In 1863, William Westbrooke Richardson, who owned most of the manor of Heene, sold his land to the Heene Estate Land Company, which in turn sold the southern part of its land to the West Worthing Investment Company in 1864. In 1865, the property of the two companies became the new town of West Worthing, which was intended to be an upmarket resort and residential area in its own right. In 1873, West Worthing was extended westwards up to the boundary with the parish of Goring at George V Avenue. The term West Worthing is still in use today.

In 1873, a new St Botolph's Church was opened on the site of the ruined chapel with the same dedication. In 1882, and again in 1895, there were plans for a pier at the bottom of Grand Avenue, which never came to fruition. West Worthing railway station opened in 1889 to serve the new town of West Worthing. The following year, West Worthing merged into the new borough of Worthing.

In 1893 West Worthing was affected by the second outbreak of typhoid fever in Worthing which resulted in 15 deaths and 58 recorded cases. In 1894, West Worthing was described as being chiefly a good class residential area with much the same relation to Worthing as Hove to Brighton.

In the early 21st century, the formerly wild part of Worthing once known as Little Heene is now known as Worthing's West End.

== Governance ==
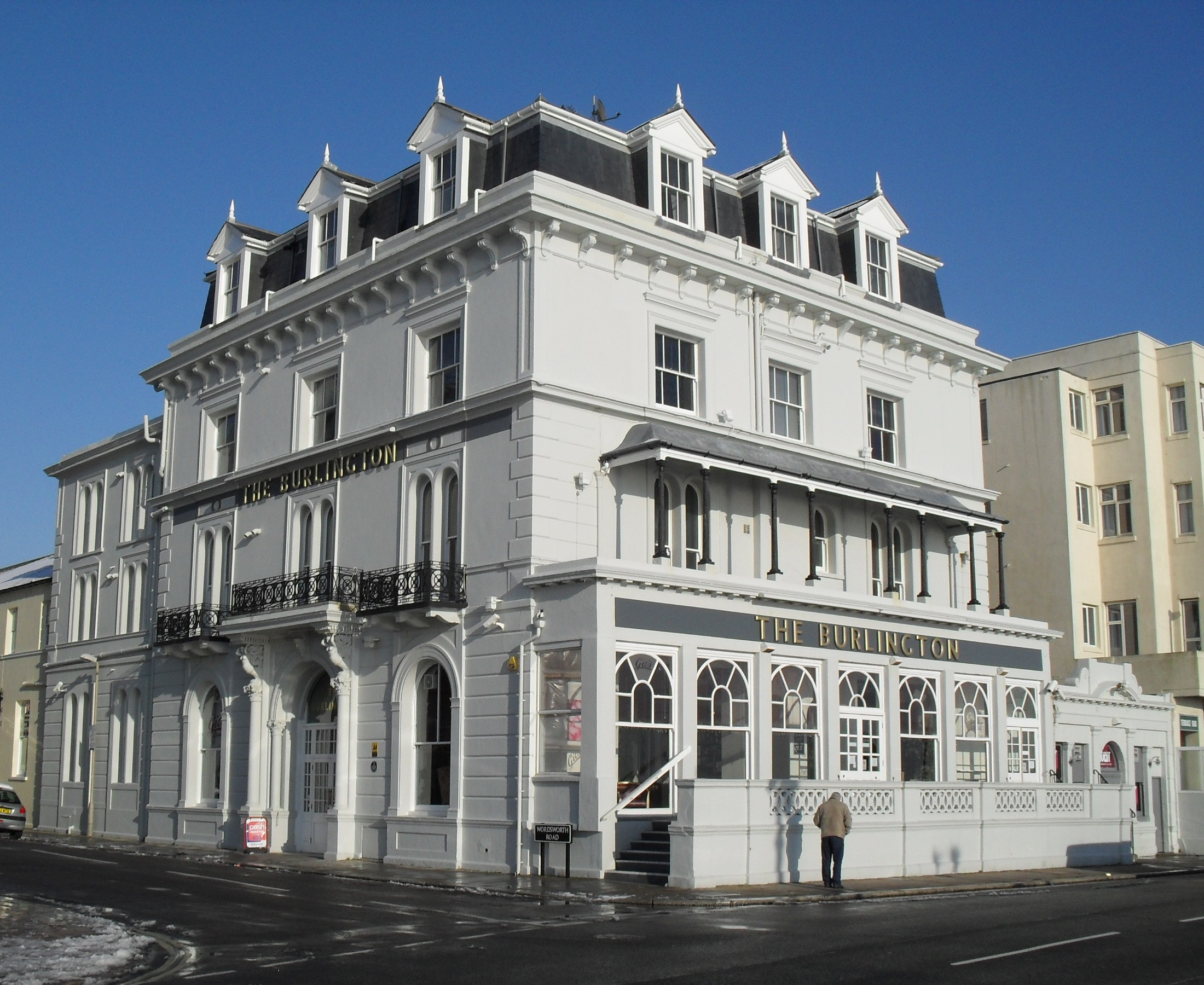
Commissioners for the township of West Worthing first met at the West Worthing Hotel (renamed the Burlington Hotel in 1890).

Modern West Worthing lies within the borough of Worthing and is divided into Heene and Marine wards. Each ward has three councillors which represent their area on Worthing Borough Council. For elections to West Sussex County Council most of the area is represented by the Worthing West electoral division, with the south-western part included in the Worthing Pier electoral division which covers most of central Worthing. The area is represented at Westminster by the Worthing West constituency.

Under the West Worthing Improvement Act 1865 (28 & 29 Vict. c. xxvii) the township of West Worthing gained its own commissioners who had powers to pave, light, drain and cleanse the streets, establish and maintain sea defences, contract for the supply of gas and water and levy rates. By 1881 the commissioners were described as an urban sanitary authority. The commissioners met at the West Worthing Hotel (now the Burlington Hotel), later moving to an Italianate building in Rowlands Road (demolished in 1974). The West Worthing commissioners and local board were succeeded in 1890 by a corporation for the new municipal borough of Worthing, which covered the previous townships of West Worthing and Worthing. West Worthing was also home to the council offices for Worthing Rural District Council which from 1933 to 1974 served the area between the Rivers Adur and Arun, with the exception of Arundel, Littlehampton and Worthing itself. The council offices were at 15 Mill Road.

== Transport ==
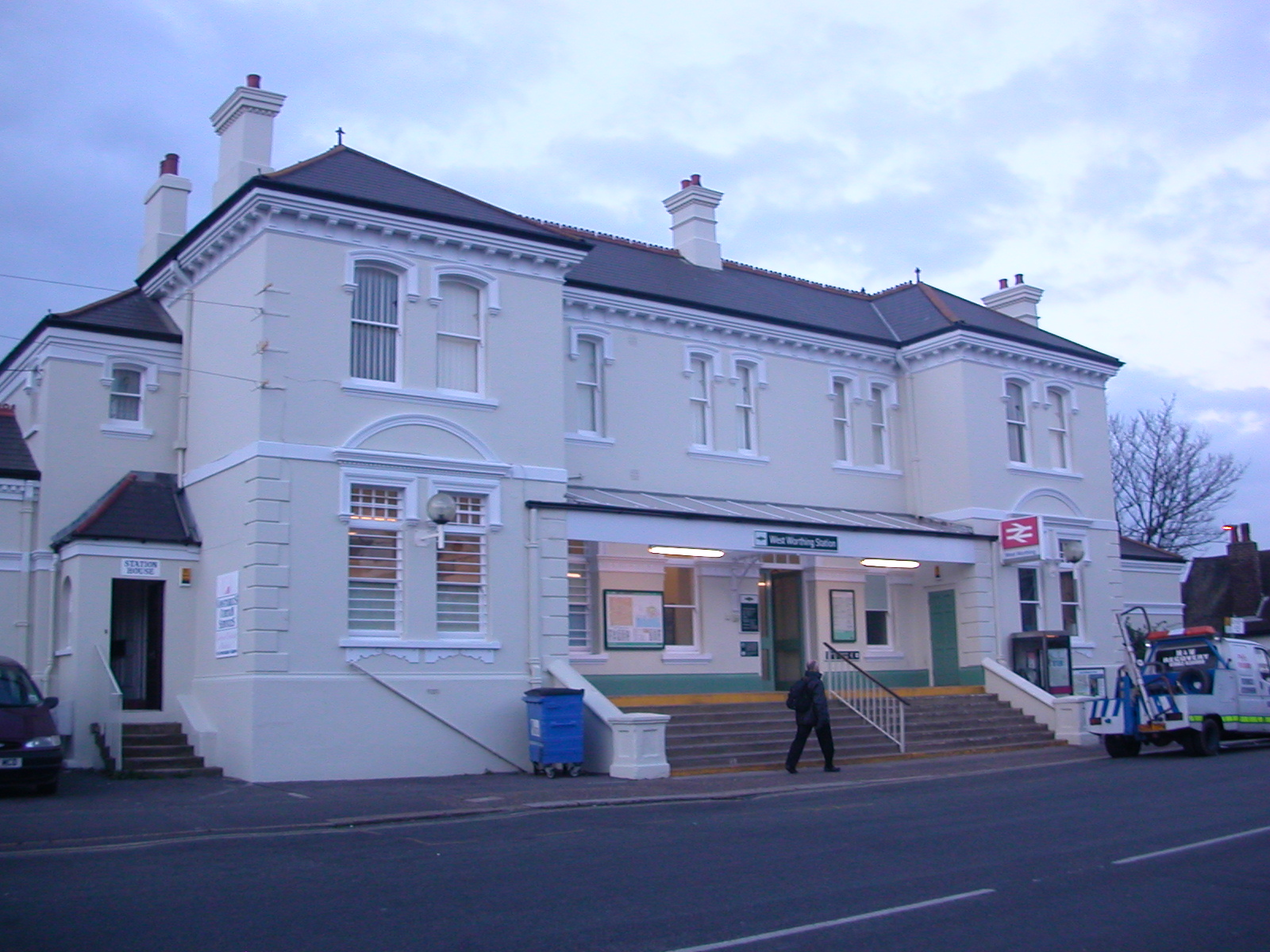
West Worthing railway station was opened in 1889 to serve West Worthing

Built to serve the new town of West Worthing, West Worthing railway station was opened in 1889 and lies on the West Coastway line. Services run to places including Brighton, Gatwick Airport, London and Portsmouth. Historically, the station was planned to be the southern terminus of a new line running from the Midlands to the South Coast, and delivering holidaymakers to the new town of West Worthing; it was consequently built near the northern end of Grand Avenue, which runs from the station to the sea. The line was never constructed.

Bus services are provided by Stagecoach South. Routes include the Coastliner 700 which connects the area to central Worthing, Brighton and Portsmouth and its most-frequent cross-town service, branded the PULSE. Some local services are provided by Compass Travel.

There are various cycle routes including the National Cycle Route 2 which runs east to Brighton and continues to Dover. The westbound route currently ends at the boundary with Goring at George V Avenue. When completed the route is expected to continue west to St Austell in Cornwall.

== Architecture ==
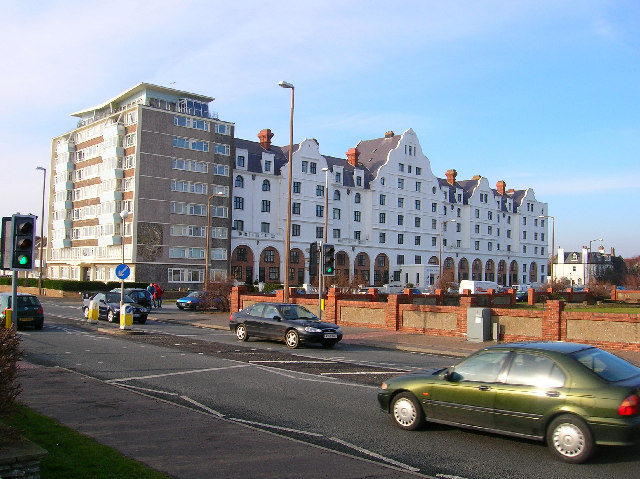
Dolphin Lodge in Grand Avenue was built in a neo-Dutch style and completed in 1922−23. The building was started in 1893 as the Hotel Metropole.

Notable Victorian buildings include Heene Terrace (built 1865), the Burlington Hotel (built 1865), St Botolph's Church (built 1872−73), the Italianate West Worthing railway station (built 1889), the Queen Anne style Downview Hotel (now flats, built 1891) and St Matthew's Church (built 1898−1900). Dolphin Lodge (completed 1922−23) was begun in 1893 as the Hotel Metropole and was intended to be significantly grander, as the centrepiece of the new town of West Worthing. According to the original plans, the hotel would have had a south elevation wider than Buckingham Palace. Following a recession, the front and west wings were never built. The building would have overlooked a pier for West Worthing.

Architecturally-significant buildings from the inter-war period include Downview Court (built 1935−36), the church of St John the Divine (built 1936−37), the Emmanuel United Reformed Church (built 1937) and the neo-Georgian pavilion in Marine Gardens. A house named 'Black Nest' on Bath Road was completed in 1926−27, having originally been built as an 18th-century barn in the Surrey village of Dunsfold and transported to West Worthing.

In the post-war period were built various notable modernist buildings including Pevensey Garden (built 1958−60), Marine Point (built 1962) and The Rowans (built 1964). Manor Lea, a 43-metre (141 ft) tall residential block has been Worthing's tallest building since it was built in 1967.

== Cinema ==
William Kennedy Dickson's 1898 film of a water polo game involving Worthing Swimming Club being played at the West Worthing Baths is one of the earliest films of a sports team. The 1968 film version of Harold Pinter's play The Birthday Party was filmed opposite the Grade II listed Heene Terrace on the seafront.

== Sport ==
A variety of sports have been practised in West Worthing. In the 19th century, horse racing took place along the sands and at Ladies Mile (now Grand Avenue). The West Worthing Lawn Tennis and Squash Club was formed in 1886, when it was based at Downview Road near West Worthing railway station. It had courts used for tennis, croquet and a bowling green. The club moved to a site near Titnore Lane in West Durrington in 1974. The Worthing Corporation extended the West Worthing Baths swimming pool in 1896. The pool was closed in 1968 when it was replaced by the Aquarena in Worthing town centre. For a period in the 1920s West Worthing was home to Worthing Rugby Football Club who borrowed a field from a local farmer off Wallace Avenue. The club then moved to the Rotary Ground in Broadwater before returning to West Worthing, to Rugby Road, in 1924–25 where they remained until 1927.

== Notable residents ==
- James Arnold, cricketer
- Alma Cogan, 1950s recording artist, moved to a large house on the corner of Lansdowne Road and Downview Road
- Emily Davison, suffragette, taught at Seabury School in Heene Parade from 1896 to 1898
- Patrick Hadley, composer, attended St Ronan's Preparatory School
- Caroline Keer, nurse
- Hugh Lloyd, actor
- Herbert Manners, cricketer
- Kenneth Mathews, cricketer
- Bob Monkhouse, comedian, moved with his family to a house in Douglas Close from 1939 to 1942.
- Michel Emmanuel Rodocanachi, trader and banker, lived at a house named Chios (now the site of Manor Lea)
- Chris Saunders, headmaster and cricketer
- Stephen Spender, poet, attended Charlecote School in Byron Road for a year from 1920 to 1921

== Bibliography ==
- Elleray, D. Robert (1998). A Millennium Encyclopaedia of Worthing History. Worthing: Optimus Books. ISBN 0-9533132-0-4.
- Glover, Judith (1997). Sussex Place-Names: Their Origins and Meanings. Countryside Books. ISBN 978-1-85306-484-5.
- Henry, James; Walton, Colin (2016). Secret Worthing. Amberley Publishing Limited. ISBN 9781445651415.
- Williamson, Elizabeth; Hudson, Tim; Musson, Jeremy; Nairn, Ian; Pevsner, Nikolaus (2019). Sussex: West. Yale University Press. ISBN 9780300225211.
