= John Mathews (cricketer) =

English cricketer

John Kenneth Mathews (6 February 1884 – 6 April 1962) was an English cricketer active from 1903 to 1930 who played for Sussex. He was born in Harlow and died in Worthing. He appeared in 40 first-class matches as a righthanded batsman who scored 778 runs with a highest score of 78.
