= List of schools in West Sussex =

This is a list of schools in West Sussex, England.

== State-funded schools ==
=== Primary schools ===
- Albourne CE Primary School, Albourne
- Aldingbourne Primary School, Westergate
- All Saints CE Primary School, Horsham
- Amberley CE Primary School, Amberley
- Arundel CE Primary School, Arundel
- Arunside School, Horsham
- Ashington CE Primary School, Ashington
- Ashurst CE Primary School, Steyning
- Ashurst Wood Primary School, Ashurst Wood
- Balcombe CE Primary School, Balcombe
- Baldwins Hill Primary School, East Grinstead
- Barnham Primary School, Barnham
- Barns Green Primary School, Barns Green
- Bartons Primary School, Bognor Regis
- Bersted Green Primary School, Bognor Regis
- The Bewbush Academy, Crawley
- Billingshurst Primary School, Billingshurst
- Birchwood Grove Community Primary School, Burgess Hill
- Birdham CE Primary School, Birdham
- Bishop Tufnell CE Primary School, Felpham
- Blackthorns Community Primary Academy, Lindfield
- Blackwell Primary School, East Grinstead
- Bohunt Horsham, Horsham
- Bolney CE Primary School, Bolney
- Bolnore Village Primary School, Bolnore Village
- Bosham Primary School, Bosham
- Boxgrove CE Primary School, Boxgrove
- Bramber Primary School, Worthing
- Broadfield Primary Academy, Crawley
- Broadwater CE Primary School, Worthing
- Brook Infant School, Crawley
- Buckingham Park Primary School, Shoreham-by-Sea
- Bury CE Primary School, Bury
- Camelsdale Primary School, Camelsdale
- Castlewood Primary School, Southwater
- Chichester Free School, Runcton
- Chidham Parochial Primary School, Chidham
- Clapham and Patching CE Primary School, Clapham
- Colgate Primary School, Colgate
- Compton and Up Marden CE Primary School, Compton
- Copthorne CE Junior School, Copthorne
- Crawley Down Village CE School, Crawley Down
- Desmond Anderson Primary Academy, Crawley
- Downsbrook Primary School, Worthing
- Downview Primary School, Felpham
- Duncton CE Junior School, Duncton
- Durrington Infant School, Durrington
- Durrington Junior School, Durrington
- Easebourne CE Primary School, Easebourne
- East Preston Infant School, East Preston
- East Preston Junior School, East Preston
- East Wittering Community Primary School, East Wittering
- Eastbrook Primary Academy, Southwick
- Eastergate CE Primary School, Eastergate
- Edward Bryant School, Bognor Regis
- Elm Grove Primary School, Worthing
- English Martyrs RC Primary School, Goring-by-Sea
- Estcots Primary School, East Grinstead
- Fairway Infant School, Copthorne
- Fernhurst Primary School, Fernhurst
- Ferring CE Primary School, Ferring
- Fishbourne CE Primary School, Fishbourne
- Fittleworth CE Village School, Fittleworth
- Forge Wood Primary School, Crawley
- Funtington Primary School, West Ashling
- The Gattons Infant School, Burgess Hill
- The Gatwick School, Crawley
- Georgian Gardens Community Primary School, Rustington
- Glebe Primary School, Southwick
- The Globe Primary Academy, Lancing
- Goring-by-Sea CE Primary School, Goring-by-Sea
- Gossops Green Primary, Crawley
- Graffham CE Infant School, Graffham
- Greenway Academy, Horsham
- Halsford Park Primary School, East Grinstead
- Handcross Primary School, Handcross
- Harlands Primary School, Haywards Heath
- Harting CE Primary School, South Harting
- Hassocks Infant School, Hassocks
- Hawthorns Primary School, Durrington
- Heene CE Primary School, Worthing
- Heron Way Primary School, Horsham
- Hilltop Primary School, Crawley
- Holbrook Primary School, Horsham
- Hollycombe Primary School, Milland
- Holmbush Primary Academy, Shoreham-by-Sea
- Holy Trinity CE Primary School, Cuckfield
- Holy Trinity CE Primary School, Lower Beeding
- Homefield Primary School, Worthing
- Jessie Younghusband Primary School, Chichester
- Jolesfield CE Primary School, Partridge Green
- Kilnwood Vale Primary School, Faygate
- Kingsham Primary School, Chichester
- Kingslea Primary School, Horsham
- Langley Green Primary School, Crawley
- The Laurels Primary School, Worthing
- Lavant CE Primary School, Lavant
- Leechpool Primary School, Horsham
- Lindfield Primary Academy, Lindfield
- London Meed Community Primary School, Burgess Hill
- Loxwood Primary School, Loxwood
- Lyminster Primary School, Wick
- Maidenbower Infant School, Crawley
- Maidenbower Junior School, Crawley
- The March CE Primary School, Westhampnett
- The Meads Primary School, East Grinstead
- Medmerry Primary School, Selsey
- Midhurst CE Primary School, Midhurst
- The Mill Primary Academy, Crawley
- Milton Mount Primary School, Crawley
- North Heath Community Primary School, Horsham
- North Lancing Primary School, Lancing
- North Mundham Primary School, North Mundham
- Northchapel Community Primary School, Northchapel
- Northgate Primary School, Crawley
- Northlands Wood Primary Academy, Haywards Heath
- Nyewood CE Infant School, Bognor Regis
- Nyewood CE Junior School, Bognor Regis
- The Oaks Primary School, Crawley
- Oakfields Primary School, Horsham
- Oak Tree Primary School, Burgess Hill
- Orchards Infant School, Durrington
- Orchards Junior School, Durrington
- Our Lady Queen of Heaven RC Primary School, Crawley
- Parklands Community Primary School, Chichester
- Petworth CE Primary School, Petworth
- Plaistow and Kirdford Primary School, Plaistow
- Portfield Primary Academy, Chichester
- Pound Hill Infant Academy, Crawley
- Pound Hill Junior School, Crawley
- Rake CE Primary School, Rake
- River Beach Primary School, Littlehampton
- Rogate CE Primary School, Rogate
- Rose Green Infant School, Rose Green
- Rose Green Junior School, Rose Green
- Rudgwick Primary School, Rudgwick
- Rumboldswhyke CE Primary School, Chichester
- Rusper Primary School, Rusper
- Rustington Community Primary School, Rustington
- St Andrew's CE Primary School, Crawley
- St Andrew's CE Primary School, Nuthurst
- St Augustine's CE Primary School, Scaynes Hill
- St Catherine's RC Primary School, Littlehampton
- St Francis of Assisi RC Primary School, Crawley
- St Giles CE Primary School, Horsted Keynes
- St James' CE Primary School, Coldwaltham
- St John the Baptist CE Primary School, Findon
- St John's RC Primary School, Horsham
- St Joseph's CE Infant School, Chichester
- St Joseph's CE Junior School, Chichester
- St Joseph's RC Primary School, Haywards Heath
- St Lawrence CE Primary School, Hurstpierpoint
- St Margaret's CE Primary School, Angmering
- St Margaret's CE Primary School, Crawley
- St Mark's CE Primary School, Staplefield
- St Mary's CE Primary School, Climping
- St Mary's CE Primary School, East Grinstead
- St Mary's CE Primary School, Horsham
- St Mary's CE Primary School, Pulborough
- St Mary's CE Primary School, Washington
- St Mary's RC Primary School, Bognor Regis
- St Mary's RC Primary School, Worthing
- St Nicolas and St Mary CE Primary School, Shoreham-by-Sea
- St Peter's CE Primary School, Ardingly
- St Peter's CE Primary School, Cowfold
- St Peter's CE Primary School, Henfield
- St Peter's RC Primary School, East Grinstead
- St Peter's RC Primary School, Shoreham-by-Sea
- St Philip's RC Primary School, Arundel
- St Richard's RC Primary School, Chichester
- St Robert Southwell RC Primary School, Horsham
- St Wilfrid's CE Primary School, Haywards Heath
- St Wilfrid's RC Primary School, Angmering
- St Wilfrid's RC Primary School, Burgess Hill
- Seal Primary Academy, Selsey
- Seaside Primary School, Lancing
- Seymour Primary School, Crawley
- Sheddingdean Community Primary School, Burgess Hill
- Shelley Primary School, Broadbridge Heath
- Shipley CE Primary School, Shipley
- Shoreham Beach Primary School, Shoreham-by-Sea
- Sidlesham Primary School, Sidlesham
- Singleton CE Primary School, Singleton
- Slindon CE Primary School, Slindon
- Slinfold CofE Primary School, Slinfold
- Sompting Village Primary School, Sompting
- South Bersted CE Primary School, South Bersted
- Southbourne Infant School, Southbourne
- Southbourne Junior School, Southbourne
- Southgate Primary, Crawley
- Southwater Infant Academy, Southwater
- Southwater Junior Academy, Southwater
- Southway Junior School, Burgess Hill
- Southway Primary School, Bognor Regis
- Springfield Infant School, Worthing
- Stedham Primary School, Stedham
- Steyning CE Primary School, Steyning
- Storrington Primary School, Storrington
- Summerlea Community Primary School, Rustington
- Swiss Gardens Primary School, Shoreham-by-Sea
- Tangmere Primary Academy, Tangmere
- Thakeham Primary School, Thakeham
- Thomas A Becket Infant School, Worthing
- Thomas A Becket Junior School, Worthing
- Thorney Island Community Primary School, Thorney Island
- Three Bridges Primary School, Crawley
- Trafalgar Community Infant School, Horsham
- Turners Hill CE Primary School, Turners Hill
- Upper Beeding Primary School, Upper Beeding
- Vale School, Worthing
- Walberton and Binsted CE Primary School, Walberton
- Warden Park Primary Academy, Haywards Heath
- Warnham CE Primary School, Warnham
- Waterfield Primary School, Crawley
- West Chiltington Community Primary School, West Chiltington
- West Dean CE Primary School, West Dean
- West Green Primary School, Crawley
- West Hoathly CE Primary School, West Hoathly
- West Park CE Primary School, Worthing
- West Wittering Parochial CE School, West Wittering
- Westbourne Primary School, Westbourne
- White Meadows Primary Academy, Littlehampton
- Whytemead Primary School, Worthing
- William Penn School, Horsham
- The Windmills Junior School, Hassocks
- Wisborough Green Primary School, Wisborough Green
- Woodgate Primary Academy, Pease Pottage
- Yapton CE Primary School, Yapton

=== Secondary schools ===
- The Academy, Selsey, Selsey
- Angmering School, Angmering
- Bishop Luffa School, Chichester
- Bohunt Horsham, Horsham
- Bohunt School Worthing, Worthing
- Bourne Community College, Southbourne
- The Burgess Hill Academy, Burgess Hill
- Chichester Free School, Runcton
- Chichester High School, Chichester
- Davison High School, Worthing
- Downlands Community School, Hassocks
- Durrington High School, Durrington
- Felpham Community College, Felpham
- The Forest School, Horsham
- The Gatwick School, Crawley
- Hazelwick School, Crawley
- Holy Trinity School, Crawley
- Ifield Community College, Crawley
- Imberhorne School, East Grinstead
- The Littlehampton Academy, Littlehampton
- Midhurst Rother College, Midhurst
- Millais School, Horsham
- Oathall Community College, Haywards Heath
- Oriel High School, Crawley
- Ormiston Six Villages Academy, Westergate
- The Regis School, Bognor Regis
- Sackville School, East Grinstead
- St Andrew's CofE High School for Boys, Worthing
- St Oscar Romero Catholic School, Goring-by-Sea
- St Paul's Catholic College, Burgess Hill
- St Philip Howard Catholic High School, Barnham
- St Wilfrid's Catholic School, Crawley
- Shoreham Academy, Shoreham-by-Sea
- Sir Robert Woodard Academy, Sompting
- Steyning Grammar School, Steyning
- Tanbridge House School, Horsham
- Thomas Bennett Community College, Crawley
- Warden Park Secondary Academy, Cuckfield
- The Weald School, Billingshurst
- Worthing High School, Worthing

=== Special and alternative schools ===
- Brantridge School, Staplefield
- Chalkhill Education Centre, Haywards Heath
- Cornfield School, Littlehampton
- Fordwater School, Chichester
- Herons Dale School, Shoreham-by-Sea
- Littlegreen Academy, Compton
- Manor Green College, Crawley
- Manor Green Primary School, Crawley
- Oak Grove College, Worthing
- Palatine School, Worthing
- Queen Elizabeth II Silver Jubilee School, Horsham
- St Anthony's School, Chichester
- West Sussex Alternative Provision College, Burgess Hill
- Woodlands Meed, Burgess Hill

=== Further education ===
- Central Sussex College
- Chichester College
- Northbrook College
- The College of Richard Collyer
- Worthing College

== Independent schools ==
=== Primary and preparatory schools ===
- Brambletye School, East Grinstead
- Conifers School, Easebourne
- Cottesmore School, Crawley
- Cumnor House School, Haywards Heath
- Dorset House School, Bury
- Great Walstead School, Haywards Heath
- Handcross Park School, Handcross
- Highfield and Brookham Schools, Linchmere
- Lancing College Prep School, Worthing
- Oakwood School, Chichester
- Pennthorpe School, Rudgwick
- The Prebendal School, Chichester
- Reflections Small School, Worthing
- Sompting Abbotts Preparatory School, Sompting (Closed July 2026)
- Westbourne House School, Chichester
- Windlesham House School, Washington

=== Senior and all-through schools ===
- Atelier21 Future School, Crawley
- Ardingly College, Haywards Heath
- Burgess Hill Girls, Burgess Hill
- Christ's Hospital, Horsham
- Farlington School, Horsham
- Great Ballard School, Chichester
- Hurstpierpoint College, Hurstpierpoint
- Lancing College, Lancing
- Our Lady of Sion School, Worthing
- Rikkyo School in England, Rudgwick
- Seaford College, Petworth
- Shoreham College, Shoreham-By-Sea
- Worth School, Crawley

=== Special and alternative schools ===
- Apple Orchard School, Slinfold
- The Amicus School, Fontwell
- Central Education Centre, Haywards Heath
- Educate U, Worthing
- Farney Close School, Bolney
- Hambrook School, Burgess Hill
- Ingfield Manor School, Billingshurst
- LVS Hassocks, Sayers Common
- Manor House School, Slinfold
- Muntham House School, Horsham
- My Choice School Arundel, Warningcamp
- New Barn School, Broadbridge Heath
- Philpots Manor School, West Hoathly
- Red Balloon Worthing Learner Centre, Worthing
- Seadown School, Worthing
- Serenity School, Crawley
- Slindon College, Slindon
- Springboard Education, Lancing

== See also ==
- University of Chichester
- Schools in Crawley, West Sussex
- Schools in Worthing, West Sussex
