= Shelagh Legrave =

British education administrator

Dame Shelagh Jane Legrave DBE is a British education administrator and accountant.

== Early life ==
Legrave studied history and theology at St John's College, Durham. She is a qualified accountant.

== Education administration ==
=== Chichester College ===
Legrave joined Chichester College as Chief Financial Officer in 2003, and became the principal in 2010. During her tenure at Chichester College, Legrave oversaw a merger with Crawley College in 2017, and Worthing College in 2019.

Legrave participated in meetings on technical education practices in the United Kingdom, that led to the creation of the T-level.

=== FE Commissioner ===
On 1 April 2021, the Secretary of State for Education, Gavin Williamson, announced Legrave would be the next Further Education Commissioner at the Department for Education, succeeding Sir Richard Atkins in October 2021.

== Honours ==
Legrave was appointed an Officer of the Order of the British Empire (OBE) in the 2015 Birthday Honours. In the 2021 Birthday Honours, Legrave was promoted to Commander of the Order of the British Empire (CBE). In the 2026 Birthday Honours, she was elevated to Dame Commander of the Order of the British Empire (DBE).

In 2022, Legrave was awarded an Honorary Doctorate of Education by the University of Chichester.
