= Chichester East (electoral division) =

Electoral division in West Sussex, England

Coordinates: 50.82329°N 0.73196°W

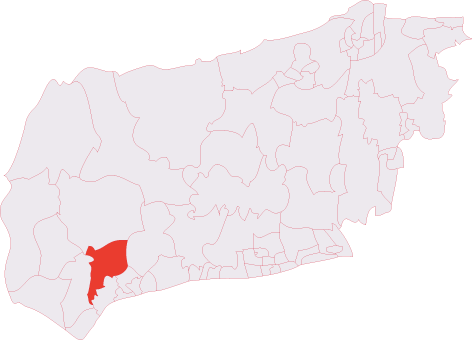
Chichester East
Shown within West Sussex
| District: | Chichester |
| UK Parliament Constituency: | Chichester |
| Ceremonial county: | West Sussex |
| Electorate (2009): | 9528 |
County Councillor
Simon Oakley (CON)

Chichester East is an electoral division of West Sussex in the United Kingdom, and returns one member to sit on West Sussex County Council.

== Extent ==
The division covers the eastern part of the town of Chichester; and the villages of Colworth, Merston, North Mundham, Oving, Runcton, South Mundham and Tangmere.

It comprises the following Chichester District wards: Chichester East Ward, North Mundham Ward and Tangmere Ward; and of the following civil parishes: the eastern part of Chichester, North Mundham, Oving and Tangmere.

== Election results ==
=== 2013 Election ===
Results of the election held on 2 May 2013:

Chichester East
| Party | Candidate | Votes | % | ±% |
|---|---|---|---|---|
| Conservative | Simon Oakley | 894 | 35.0 | −0.6 |
| Liberal Democrats | Andrew Smith | 663 | 26.0 | −26.3 |
| UKIP | Alicia Denny | 648 | 25.4 | N/A |
| Labour | Ben Earnshaw-Mansell | 349 | 13.7 | +7.7 |
| Majority | | 231 | 9.0 | +9.0 |
| Turnout | | 2,554 | 24.4 | −10.1 |
| Conservative gain from Liberal Democrats | | Swing | 12.9% LD to Con | |

=== 2009 Election ===
Results of the election held on 4 June 2009:

Chichester East
| Party | Candidate | Votes | % | ±% |
|---|---|---|---|---|
| Liberal Democrats | Andrew Smith | 1,717 | 52.3 | +11.5 |
| Conservative | Norman Dingemans | 1,168 | 35.6 | +2.7 |
| BNP | Ray Fallick | 203 | 6.2 | +6.2 |
| Labour | June Leonard | 196 | 6.0 | −13.5 |
| Majority | | 549 | 16.7 | +8.8 |
| Turnout | | 3,284 | 34.5 | −24.7 |
| Liberal Democrats hold | | Swing | | |

=== 2005 Election ===
Results of the election held on 5 May 2005:

Chichester East
| Party | Candidate | Votes | % | ±% |
|---|---|---|---|---|
| Liberal Democrats | Mr A R H Smith | 2,191 | 40.8 | |
| Conservative | Mr S I King | 1,765 | 32.9 | |
| Labour | Mr B Earnshaw-Mansell | 1,047 | 19.5 | |
| UKIP | Mr A S Preater-Cole | 368 | 6.9 | |
| Majority | | 426 | 7.9 | |
| Turnout | | 5,371 | 59.2 | |
| Liberal Democrats win (new seat) | | | | |
