= Schools in Worthing, West Sussex =

Schools in Worthing are provided by West Sussex County Council and by a number of independent providers. Both non-denominational and Church of England maintained schools were previously organised along three tier lines, with students transferring from a first school at age 8 to a middle school, and then starting High School at age 12. This system was introduced in 1973 as part of a move to reorganise schools to provide comprehensive education across West Sussex. In 2015, schools returned to the more common pattern of transfer at the end of a Key Stage.

The local authority provides 22 primary schools (through a combination of infant, junior and primary schools) and six high schools, alongside a primary and a secondary special school.

Bohunt School Worthing was established in September 2015 as a mixed secondary school for 900 pupils, as part of the process ending three-tier education in the town.

== Maintained schools ==
=== Primary schools ===
Name	Image	Location/Coordinates	Age Range	Approximate Roll	Notes
Bramber Primary School		Broadwater; 50°49′57.26″N 0°21′39.69″W	4–11	190	The school is expanding to become a 210-place primary school from September 2015. It was previously a first school for 4 – 8-year-olds.
Broadwater CE Primary School		Broadwater; 50°49′42.36″N 0°22′38.48″W	4–11	500	An infants' school opened in 1817, expanding gradually by 1893 to include juniors. The current building opened in 1937, with the school becoming a first and middle school between 1974 and 2015. The school is a 420-place primary school from September 2015.
Chesswood Junior School		Worthing; 50°49′11.54″N 0°21′44.71″W	7–11	540	Original building opened in 1972. Major fire caused closure, and new building opened 1992 From September 2015 the school became a 720-place junior school.
Downsbrook Primary School		Broadwater; 50°49′38.54″N 0°21′53.07″W	4–11	490	Originally opened in the 1930s as junior mixed and infant school, then junior school only from 1939. Became Middle school in 1974. The school introduced its first infant intakes in September 2015 to become a 630-place primary school.
Durrington Infant School		Durrington; 50°50′6.26″N 0°24′16.66″W	4–7	270	Opened in 1908 as Durrington mixed and infant council school. Became a separate first school in 1973. Now run under joint headteacher with Durrington Middle School, the school is a 270-place infant school from September 2015.
Durrington Junior School		Durrington; 50°50′4″N 0°24′19.75″W	7–11	360	Opened in 1908 as Durrington mixed and infant council school. Became a primary school, with new buildings opening in 1971, in preparation for change to First and Middle School in 1973. Now run under joint headteacher with Durrington First School, the school is a 360-place junior school since September 2015.
Elm Grove Primary School		Worthing; 50°48′55.8″N 0°24′5.26″W	4–11	260	Opened in 1905 as Elm Grove mixed and infant council school. Became a first school in 1977, feeding to West Park Middle Following scrapped initial proposals to become an infant school feeding into Thomas A Becket Junior, the school is expanding to become a 210-place primary school from September 2015.
English Martyrs Catholic Primary School		Durrington; 50°49′32.21″N 0°24′45.32″W	4–11	210	Opened in 1973
Field Place Infant School		Durrington; 50°49′32.21″N 0°24′45.32″W	4–7	410	Current buildings in use from 1954, having previously been housed in a converted radar station on Palatine Road The school lost its Year 3 class to become a 360-place infant school from September 2015.
Goring-by-Sea CE Primary School		Goring-by-Sea; 50°48′48.38″N 0°25′18.88″W	4–11	Opened in current buildings in 1961, replacing C of E school dating back to 1844 Initial plans to convert to an infant school were overturned, and as a result the school is expanding to become a 420-place primary school by 2017.	
Hawthorns Primary School		Durrington; 50°49′42.48″N 0°25′17.49″W	4–11	170	Opened in 1977 The school is expanding to become a 210-place primary school from September 2015.
Heene CE Primary School		Heene; 50°48′56.53″N 0°22′47.44″W	4–11	320	National school opened in Heene Road in 1886. Became First and Middle school in September 1973, with First School opening in new buildings on current site; middle school remained at Heene Road. Repeated delays in moving the middle school to the current site led to alternative options seeing middle school department closing in July 1986, and pupils and staff moving to Thomas A Becket Middle School. The school will retain its current pupils until Year 6 to become a 420-place primary school from September 2015.
The Laurels Primary School		Durrington; 50°49′46.09″N 0°25′35.95″W	4–11	160	Opened in 1987 The school is to become a 210-place primary school from September 2015.
Lyndhurst Infant School		Worthing; 50°49′1.61″N 0°21′19.26″W	4–7	360	Opened as Lyndhurst Road junior mixed and infant council school in 1936
The Orchards Junior School		Durrington; 50°49′18.15″N 0°25′0.25″W	7–11	590	Opened as Maybridge county junior mixed school in 1954, later becoming John Selden Junior School, then middle school. The school is a 480-place junior school from September 2015, with the intention of becoming an academy.
Palatine School		Durrington; 50°49′30.23″N 0°24′50.57″W	3–11	90	Formerly all-age school for moderate learning difficulties, originally opened as George Pringle school for sub-normal children in 1951. Became primary in 2005.
Springfield Infant School		Worthing; 50°49′18.25″N 0°21′51.24″W	4–7	200	Opened in 1992. The school has now lost its Year 3 classes to become a 180-place infant school from September 2015.
St Mary's Catholic Primary School		Heene; 50°48′52.84″N 0°22′46.97″W	4–11	280	Originally opened in the 1860s, was known between 1877 and 1929. Reopened as St Mary's in 1929 on current site.
Thomas A Becket Infant School		Tarring; 50°49′36.96″N 0°23′42.59″W	4–7	600	A school in Tarring dates back as far as 1732. By the late 19th century the Old Palace was in use as a school. The council took over the school in 1909 as an infant school with a junior department opening on the current site in 1964, the school now operating under its name of Thomas A Becket Primary School. The school became a combined first and middle in 1974, separating from its middle school department in 1985. The school is increasing its intake to become a 540-place infant school from September 2015.
Thomas A Becket Junior School		Tarring; 50°49′40.62″N 0°23′23.78″W	7–11	780	Formed from the former middle school departments of Heene First and Thomas A Becket First in 1985. Following changes to the age of transfer the school becomes a 720-place junior school from September 2015. Thomas A Becket Middle School was the former West Tarring High School for Boys or West Tarring Secondary Modern School, the former school of Keith Emerson of Emerson, Lake & Palmer (ELP)
Vale School		Findon Valley; 50°50′54.12″N 0°24′3.49″W	4–11	680	Opened as The Vale county junior mixed and infant school in 1951, later becoming first and middle school. The school no longer has Year 7 pupils becoming a 630-place primary school from September 2015.
West Park CE Primary School		Goring-by-Sea; 50°48′50.19″N 0°24′57.99″W	4–11	780	Opened as separate schools in 1952–53. Became first and middle schools respectively in 1974, gaining controlled status in 1977 and merging in 1995. The school is increasing its intake to 4 classes in Reception to become an 840-place primary school from September 2015.
Whytemead Primary School		Broadwater; 50°49′37.39″N 0°21′58.23″W	4–11	300	Opened in 1939 as infants school. The school is expanding to become a 315-place primary school from September 2015.

=== Secondary schools ===
Name	Image	Location/Coordinates	Age Range	Approximate Roll	Notes
Bohunt School Worthing		Worthing; 50°49′29.58″N 0°22′28.67″W	11–16	800	Opened on a temporary site in September 2015 as part of change in age of transfer. Intended capacity is 900 when fully open.
Davison CE High School for Girls		Worthing; 50°49′10.03″N 0°21′21.58″W	11–16	1070	Opened for senior girls in 1927, following on from several schools taking the Davison name after local reverend William Davison. Became a secondary modern school in 1944, then comprehensive girls' school again in 1973, having moved to its current site in 1960.
Durrington High School		Durrington; 50°49′39.36″N 0°24′26.78″W	11–16	1650	Formed in 1974 from merger of Worthing Technical High School (formerly Worthing Junior Technical School for Building, opened 1949) and Worthing County Secondary Girls' School (formerly Sussex Road Board School, opened 1902).
Oak Grove College		Durrington; 50°49′38.09″N 0°24′35.89″W	11–19	240	Formerly Highdown All-Age Special School, became Wide-Spectrum Special School in 2005
St Andrew's High School for Boys		Worthing; 50°49′18.96″N 0°22′2.17″W	11–16	730	Opened as a private mixed and infant school in 1897, becoming a senior boys' school in 1927. Acted as secondary modern school from 1944 to 1973, when it became comprehensive high school. Based at current site since 1965.
St Oscar Romero Catholic School		Goring-by-Sea; 50°48′59.19″N 0°26′3.57″W	11–16	610	Opened as St Mary's Roman Catholic Secondary Modern School in 1957 Changed name in 1973 to Chatsmore Catholic High School.
Worthing High School		Worthing; 50°49′21.89″N 0°22′49.6″W	11–16	900	Council school opened in 1914 on current site. Served as grammar school from 1944 to 1973, then becoming girls' comprehensive. Merged with Tarring Boys' School to form current comprehensive in the early 1980s.

== Independent schools ==
Name	Status	Age Range	Approximate Roll	Notes
Broadwater Manor School	Day prep school	3–13	240	Founded 1930
Our Lady of Sion School	Day prep & senior school	2–19	510	Founded 1862
