= Worthing College =

Sixth form college in West Sussex, England

Location
- 1 Sanditon Way; Worthing, West Sussex, BN14 9FD; England; 50.81878°N 0.40916°W

Information
- Type: Sixth form college
- Established: 1973
- Local authority: West Sussex
- Department for Education URN: 130845 Tables
- Ofsted: Reports
- Principal: Helena Thomas
- Gender: Coeducation
- Age: 16 to 18
- Affiliations: Chichester College Group
- Website: http://www.worthing.ac.uk

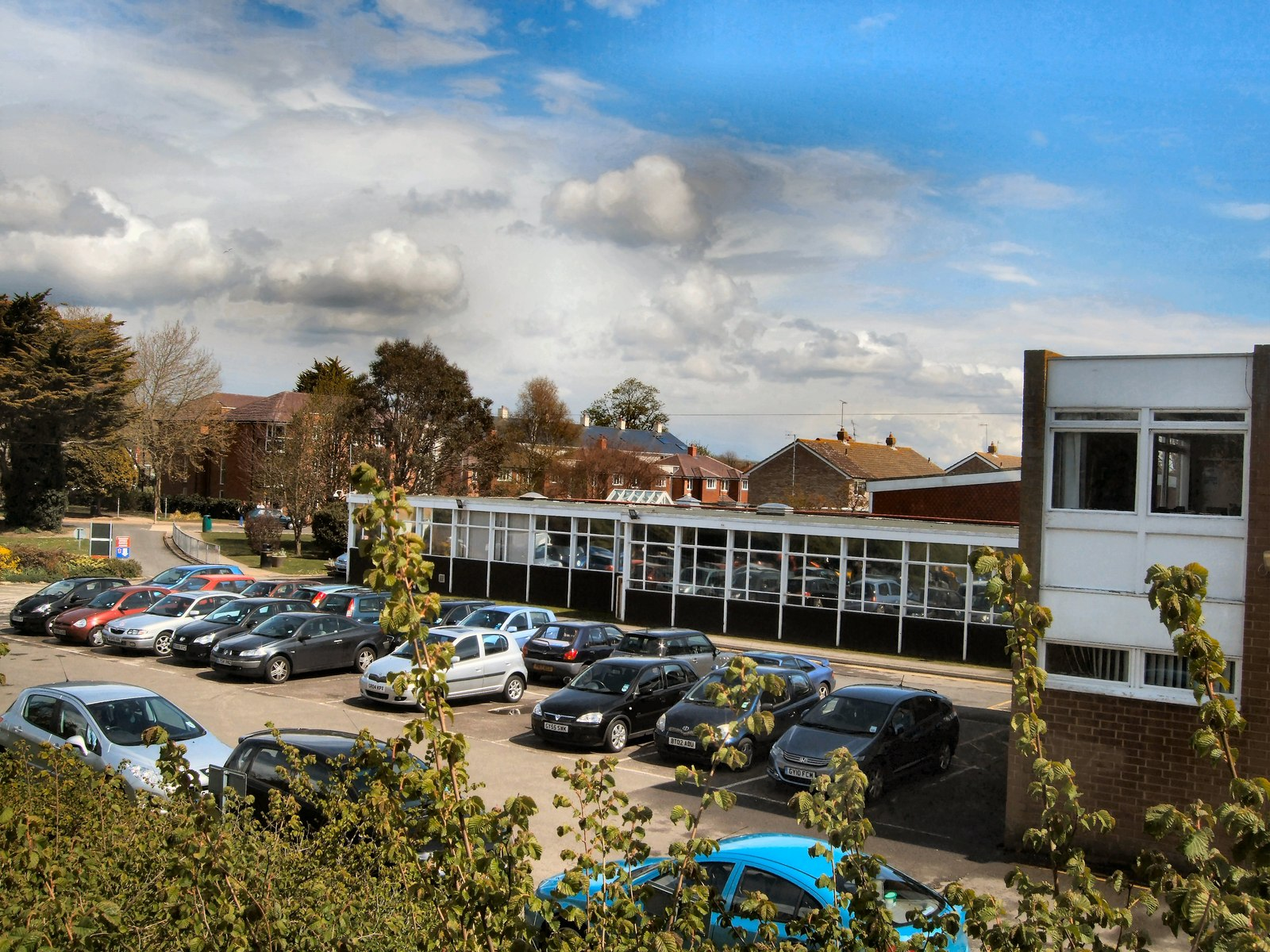
Worthing College Worthing College

Worthing College is one of seven campuses of the Chichester College Group further education provider, together with Brighton MET College, Brinsbury College, Chichester College, Crawley College, Haywards Heath College and Northbrook College. Worthing College is situated in Broadwater, in the town of Worthing on the south coast of England.

== History ==
=== Grammar school ===
The school directly descends from the former Worthing High School for Boys on Bolsover Road, also known as Worthing Grammar School. It had been on that site since 1963, changing to a sixth form college in 1974. Worthing High School for Boys had opened on Broadwater Road in 1924.

The girls' grammar school, Gaisford Girls' High School, previously Worthing High School for Girls, located on a separate site in Gaisford Road, became Worthing High School in 1974. At the same time Worthing Technical High School became Durrington High School.

In July 2013 the college moved to a new campus at 1 Sanditon Way, which was converted from Aviva's Regional Headquarters.

== Admissions ==
It offers a range of courses and facilities for sixth form students, adult students, those in employment and visiting international students, offering over 65 AS/A Level, BTEC courses and from 2020 new T-level courses.

Worthing College has classrooms and laboratories, 8 Learning Zones designed to develop independent learning skills, Art and Design, Media and Film Studies. It has a Sports Academy and an on site fitness gym, open to all students and staff.

== Academic performance ==
The 2016 Ofsted report gave a number of findings for the college being a good provider and others showing why it was not yet an outstanding provider. Overall it was good. The 2013 Ofsted report had said it required improvement in several areas.

In 2016 the College recorded its 'best ever' A Level Results with a 98.8% Pass Rate.

== Notable alumni ==
=== Worthing College ===
- Sir David Akers-Jones CMG, Chief Secretary of Hong Kong from 1985-7
- Britt Allcroft, creator of the Thomas & Friends TV series
- Rt Rev Frederick Andrew Amoore, Bishop of Bloemfontein from 1967–82
- Mick Farren, journalist, author, lyricist, counter cultural figure, agent provocateur and proto punk garage rock singer
- Martin Fleischmann, Professor of Chemistry at Imperial College London from 1983-7, and President of the International Society of Electrochemistry from 1970-2
- Stanley Gill, Professor of Computing from 1964-70 at Imperial College London, and President of the British Computer Society from 1967-8, and invented the first computer subroutine
- Billy Idol (William Broad), punk rock singer, Worthing High School for Boys, circa 1974
- Simon Mayo, Worthing High School for boys early 1970s then the Sixth-Form College 1974-76
- Ed Mitchell, business journalist
- Admiral Mark Stanhope OBE, First Sea Lord of the Royal Navy.
- Ken Suttle, Sussex cricketer
