= Ivy Davison =

British journalist and editor

- Born: Ivy Lilian Margaret Davison; 14 June 1892; Sevenoaks, Kent
- Died: 15 November 1977 (aged 85); North Mundham, West Sussex
- Occupation(s): Journalist, editor
- Employer(s): The Saturday Review; The Geographical Magazine; Basic English Foundation
- Organization: Voluntary Aid Detachment

Ivy Davison (14 June 1892 – 15 November 1977) was a British journalist and editor. Her friend, Vita Sackville-West, described her as "a young woman of some enterprise and independence... having shaken herself free of ready-made traditions, to the dismay of her parents, in order to earn her own living".

== Early life ==
Ivy Lilian Margaret Davison was born on 14 June 1892 near Sevenoaks, Kent. She was the third of six children born to Dorothy Georgiana Mary (née Norris) and Arthur Pearson Davison. The family, who were comfortably off, moved to Broughton Grange in Oxfordshire, and later to Kemsing, Kent. Friends of the family included the Sackvilles. Alongside her four sisters, Ivy Davison was educated at home.

During World War I, Davison worked in the Voluntary Aid Detachment (VAD) hospital in Kemsing, where she took charge of bookkeeping and supplies. Between 1916 and 1917, she volunteered as a VAD nurse at a Red Cross hospital in Forges-les-Eaux, Normandy. She subsequently volunteered at the King George Hospital and at Devonshire House, both in London.

After the War, Davison moved to London, and into the flat in Earl's Court where she would live for almost forty years.

== Career ==
Davison began working for the Saturday Review as a sub-editor, later becoming assistant editor. In 1930, she moved to the new Week-End Review, also as assistant editor, until it was absorbed by the New Statesman in 1933. The following year, she was employed by Virginia Woolf as a letter writer.

Davison's literary journalism was frequently unsigned. In her editorial work for the Saturday Review, she was remembered as "careful" and "patient". Davison also conducted interviews with authors, among them Vera Brittain. Her circle of friends included Brittain, Lady Rhondda, and Rose Macauley.

Around 1937, Davison began work as assistant editor at The Geographical Magazine, founded two years earlier by Michael Huxley. In 1939, she was appointed acting editor, becoming executive editor from 1943. She worked closely with the magazine's "literary advisor" John Lehmann, who described Davison as "one of the most intelligent women I have ever met, well-read, perceptive, witty and energetic". By October 1939, the magazine had reached a circulation of 50,000, but the outbreak of World War II saw this cut in half. From this point on, while managing the challenges of wartime London, Davison steered the magazine into increasingly literary territory, with contributors including Sylvia Townsend Warner, Phyllis Bentley, V. S. Pritchett, Laurie Lee, and L. P. Hartley.

Davison resigned from her editorship of The Geographical Magazine in 1945 Davison, on the grounds of ill health. She later joined the Basic English Foundation, first as assistant to the director, and subsequently as secretary. She maintained an association with The Geographical Magazine, retaining responsibility for the "World in Books" section into the mid-1960s.

== Later life and death ==
Ivy Davison retired to North Mundham, near Chichester. There, she completed work on a book: At the Country Villas. The story of life in country houses around London during the eighteenth century, she was unable to find a publisher.

Davison died from heart failure on 15 November 1977. She left a collection of 1100 books, along with her own unpublished manuscript, to the British Federation of University Women's Sybil Campbell Library.
