= Thomas Becket School =

Thomas Becket School may refer to one of the following British schools named after St Thomas Becket:

- Thomas Becket Catholic School, a secondary school in Northampton, Northamptonshire.
- Thomas A Becket Middle School, a middle school in Worthing, West Sussex.
- St Thomas à Becket Catholic Comprehensive School, secondary school in Wakefield, West Yorkshire
