= Southern Theater =

Southern Theater or Southern Theatre may refer to:

- The Southern Theater, Minneapolis, Minnesota
- Southern Theatre (Columbus, Ohio)
- Southern Theatres, American movie theater chain
- Southern Theatre Arts Centre, a performing arts school in England

== Military ==
- Southern theater of the American Revolutionary War
- Southern Theater Command, one of the five military regions of China's People's Liberation Army
- Andaman and Nicobar Command, Indian Armed Forces command for Southeast Asia
- Maritime Theatre Command, proposed Indian Armed Forces command which will amalgamate the above

== See also ==
- Nanxi (theatre), a historical form of Chinese opera, sometimes translated literally as "Southern Theatre"
