= Wooden Spoon Society =

UK children's charity

Wooden Spoon is the children’s charity of rugby. It supports children and young people with disabilities or living in disadvantage in the United Kingdom and Ireland. Since 1983, Wooden Spoon has committed more than £29 million to more than 1,300 projects, supporting over 1.4 million disabled and disadvantaged children and young people.

== History ==
Wooden Spoon was founded in 1983 after five England rugby supporters went to Dublin to watch England in the final game of the Five Nations Championship against the Irish. The game was lost 25–15 and England finished last in the table with just a single point gained from their draw against Wales. After the match, in a Dublin bar, five England supporters were presented with a wooden spoon by their Irish friends. Accepting the gift, the England fans decided to hold a golf match to see who would keep the wooden spoon. When the golf match was held £8,450 was raised and the money was used to provide a new minibus for a local special education school, Park School.

The life president, Peter Scott, is one of the founders. He was awarded the MBE for services to charity in 2002.

== Wooden Spoon projects ==
Wooden Spoon's focus is on supporting children and young people through projects such as sensory rooms, playground and outdoor activities, health and wellbeing and specialist equipment. Projects include:

- £30,000 for a new building for ACE Centre Advisory Trust.
- £250,000 towards a new children's hospital, Noah's Ark Children's Hospital for Wales.
- £60,000 to Game on Glasgow.
- £40,000 for a redesign of the physiotherapy gymnasium at Royal Manchester Children's Hospital.
- £7,000 for a soft playroom at Oak Grove College.

== HITZ ==
HITZ is a programme supported by Wooden Spoon and delivered by Premiership Rugby using rugby to help young people back into education, vocational training, apprenticeships and employment. In 2012, HITZ received the Best Community Programme Award at the Sports Industry Awards.
