= Liz Byrski =

Writer, academic, journalist

Liz Byrski, AM
- Born: Elizabeth Ann Byrski; 1944 (age 81–82); London, United Kingdom
- Occupations: Writer and journalist

Elizabeth Ann Byrski AM (born 1944 in London) is an Australian writer and journalist.

== Biography ==
After graduating from Notre Dame Convent in Lingfield, Surrey, in 1960, Byrski attended the Crawley College of Further Education (1960–61) and the Wall Hall College of Education (1973–74). Her journalism career began when she started as a journalist in 1962 on the Horley Advertiser (part of Surrey Mirror Newspapers), in Horley, Surrey. She moved to Australia in 1981.

Byrski was appointed a Member of the Order of Australia in the 2023 Australia Day Honours.

== Journalism ==
As a freelance journalist Byrski's work has appeared in the Australian Financial Review, The West Australian, The Australian, The Age, the San Francisco Chronicle, the San Francisco Examiner, and The Dominion (Wellington, NZ), Homes and Living, New Idea, Cosmopolitan, SkyWest In-Flight, Building Magazine, and Portfolio.

In 1988 to 1990 and from 1993 to 1996, she was a broadcaster and executive producer at ABC 720 6WF in Perth. This period included co-presenting the Grapevine program with then-television newsreader Peter Holland. She was also an occasional book reviewer for the ABC.

In 1987, she was a panelist on the daily Channel 7 program Beauty and the Beast.

She has won several awards for her journalism, including the Radio Prize at the 1996 WA Media Awards and the CSIRO WA Award for Excellence in Science Journalism.

From 1983 to 1989, she wrote the weekly Viewpoint column in Perth's Community Newspapers group.

She has been an occasional guest presenter for the School of Isolated and Distance Education TV program Our Side Your Side.

She has also been a policy advisor to the Government of Western Australia and is a past-President of the WA Women's Advisory Council to the Premier. Her past honorary positions include board memberships with the WA Alzheimer's Association and the Family Planning Association of WA.

== Books ==
=== Novels ===
- Gang of Four (Pan Macmillan Australia, 2004)
- Food, Sex & Money (Pan Macmillan Australia, 2005)
- Belly Dancing for Beginners (Pan Macmillan Australia, 2006)
- Trip of a Lifetime (Pan Macmillan Australia, 2008)
- Bad Behaviour (Pan Macmillan Australia, 2009)
- Last Chance Cafe (Pan Macmillan Australia, 2010)
- In the Company of Strangers (Pan Macmillan Australia, 2012)
- Family Secrets (Pan Macmillan Australia, 2015)
- The Woman Next Door (Pan Macmillan Australia, 2016)
- A Month of Sundays (Pan Macmillan Australia, 2018)

Gang of Four was published in France in 2007 as La bande des quarters by Les Presses de la Cite, and in Germany by Mohrbooks in 2008. Food, Sex & Money was published in France by Presses de la Cite in 2009 and in Germany in 2010.

=== Anthologies ===
- Sunscreen and Lipstick (Fremantle Press, 2012)
- Just Between Us (Pan Macmillan Australia, 2013)
- Summer Lovin' (Fremantle Press, 2013)
- Purple Prose (Fremantle Press, 2015)

=== Non-fiction ===
- Behind the Bedroom Door: Alcoholism, the family disease (Veritas, 1984)
- Workwise: Getting a job and starting out (Nelson, 1985)
- Pills, Potions, People: Understanding the drug problem (Collins, 1985)
- Under the Influence: Growing up in alcoholic families (Collins, 1987)
- Facing Cancer: Searching for solutions (Collins, 1989, and revised and updated by Southern Cross University in 2002)
- The Grapevine Quick & Easy Cookbook (co-editor, Fremantle Arts Centre Press, 1996)
- Spectacular Australian Sea Rescues (New Holland, 1997)
- The Way Ahead: Prominent Australians talk about the future of our nation (New Holland, 1998)
- Western Australia – Land of Contrasts (New Holland, 1998)
- Speaking Out: Australian women talk about success (New Holland, 1999)
- Remember Me (Fremantle Arts Centre Press, 2000; translated into German and published in Germany by Piper Malik in 2001)
- Getting On: Some Thoughts on Women and Ageing (Momentum, 2012)
- In Love and War: nursing heroes (Fremantle Press, 2015)
- Women of a Certain Rage: Life stories (Fremantle Press, 2021)

== Academia ==
Byrski is an Associate Professor and the Director of the China Australia Writing Centre at Curtin University.

From 1996 to 2003, she was an Adjunct Teaching Fellow at Curtin, teaching Professional Writing, Journalism and Media Ethics.

From 1984 to 1988, she was a sessional tutor in print journalism at the-then Western Australia Institute of Technology (now called Curtin University of Technology).

== Memberships ==
Byrski is a member of the Australian Journalists Association section of the Media, Entertainment and Arts Alliance; and the Australian Society of Authors.
