= Richard Atkins (educational administrator) =

British administrator

Sir Richard James Atkins, CBE (born 10 May 1953) is a former Further Education College teacher and Principal, before becoming the Further Education Commissioner for England between 2016 and 2021.

== Early life and work in retail ==
Born in Bristol on 10 May 1953, Atkins was raised by his adoptive parents, Jim and Betty Atkins. After attending Belmont School, Hereford, he was employed as a temporary worker by the department store Harrods; he stayed there for three years, eventually joining their management training programme and becoming a distribution manager at their warehouse in Barnes.

== Further education teaching and administration ==
Between 1976 and 1979, Atkins trained as a teacher at Bulmershe College, graduating with a Bachelor of Education degree in history and education. He then taught at Bishop Reindorp School in Guildford while completing a Master of Science degree in education management at the University of Surrey. He moved into working in further education after graduating, taking up posts successively at Chichester College, Guildford College and in York (the latter in a senior management role). He was then appointed assistant principal at Yeovil College and was promoted to principal ten months later, in 1994. In 2002, he moved to Exeter College, where he was the principal until 2016. During his tenure, the college won several national awards. In the meantime, Atkins was president of the Association for College Management (2002–04) and president of the Association of Colleges (2014–15), having been on the latter's board and its deputy chair between 2007 and 2013. He was the founding Chair of AoC Sport between 2012 and 2016.

Atkins was appointed Further Education Commissioner at the Department for Education in October 2016. He has also served as Pro-Chancellor of the University of Exeter since 2017.

== Honours and awards ==
Atkins was awarded an honorary Doctor of Law degree by the University of Exeter in 2016. He also received the Freedom of the City of Exeter in 2016. The same year (in the New Year Honours), he was appointed a Commander of the Order of the British Empire (CBE). He was knighted in the 2021 New Year Honours.
