= Chichester College =

Further education college in Chichester, West Sussex, England

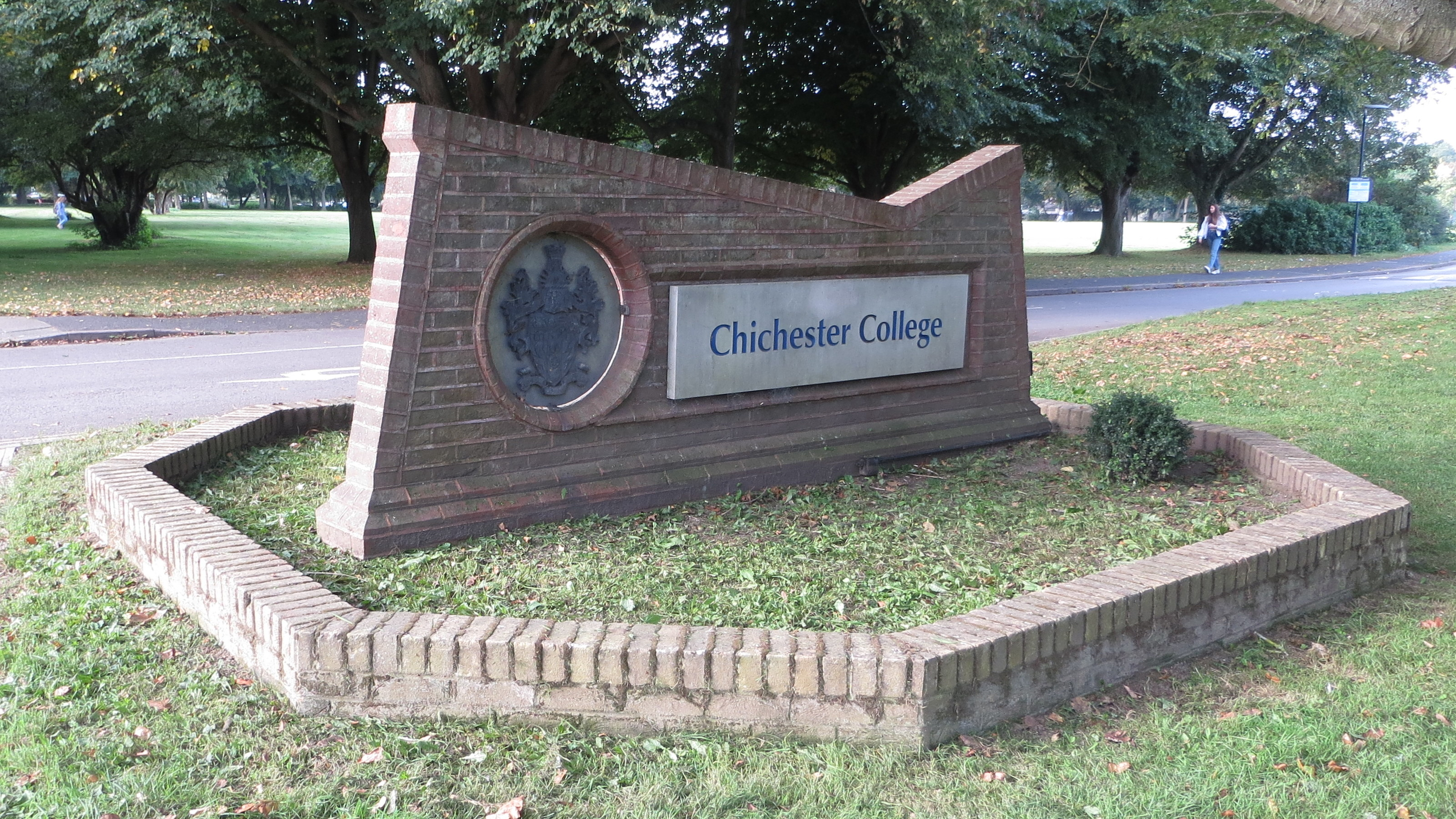
- Chichester College campus

Location
- Avenue de Chartres; Chichester, West Sussex, PO19 1SB; United Kingdom; 50°50′07″N 0°47′20″W

Information
- Established: 1964
- Ofsted: Reports
- Principal: Helen Loftus
- Gender: Co-educational
- Age: 16+
- Language: English
- Campus: Chichester; Brinsbury College (land-based campus near Pulborough)
- Campus type: Urban and rural
- Website: https://www.chichester.ac.uk

Chichester College is a further education college in Chichester, West Sussex, England. It forms the Chichester campus of the Chichester College Group, one of the largest providers of further education in the south-east of England.

The college was established in 1964 and provides a wide range of academic and vocational programmes including A levels, BTEC qualifications, apprenticeships and higher education courses. It also operates the Brinsbury College campus near Pulborough, which specialises in land-based education.

Chichester College Group also includes Crawley College, Worthing College, Haywards Heath College, Brighton MET College and Northbrook College.

Chichester College has over 20,000 students across its campuses, including more than 5,000 full-time learners. Courses range from academic programmes to technical and vocational training designed to prepare young people and adults for employment or further study.

The college was a member of the Collab Group, which represented large and high-performing further education colleges in England.

The college is inspected by Ofsted under URN SC042625.

== Campus ==
The main campus is located on Avenue de Chartres in Chichester.

The Chichester College group was rated 'Outstanding' in all areas of the Ofsted inspection framework in March 2020.

The Falkland Islands Government pays the college to educate Falkland Islanders for national diplomas and NVQs.

== History ==
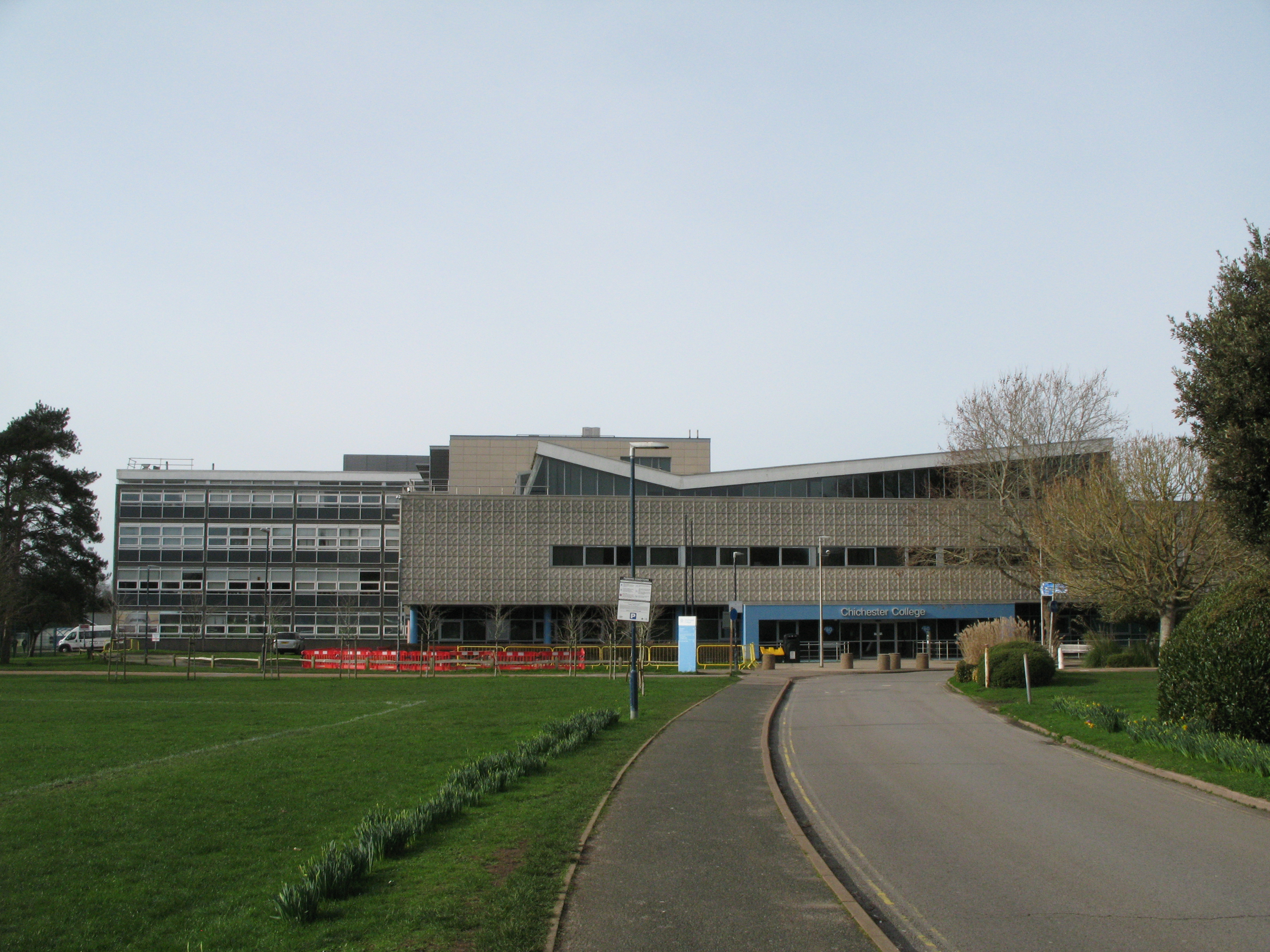
Chichester College's Front Building

Chichester College, opened on 28 September 1964 as the Chichester College of Art and Technology, as the major centre for a wide range of academic, commercial, scientific, technical, recreational and adult education courses in the south western part of West Sussex. The college is set in Westgate Fields within sight and to the south west of the Chichester Cathedral, half a mile from the Chichester Market Cross.

In the past, various musicians have performed at the college, including "The Who" who in April 1966 performed in the main hall of the college, and David Bowie on 23 February 1972 who performed at the college as part of the Ziggy Stardust Tour.

Brinsbury campus is in West Sussex, three miles north of Pulborough. It was founded as an agricultural education centre for West Sussex and was a base for Land Girls during the Second World War. In 1966 it was officially designated the West Sussex School of Agriculture. It became Brinsbury College in 1998 and then merged with Chichester College in 2002.

Chichester College was awarded an Ofsted "Outstanding" in 2014. The financial situation of the college in 2014 was later described by the chief executive, Shelagh Legrave, as "really grim".

In 2017, the college merged with Crawley College (formerly Central Sussex College) creating the largest college group in Sussex. It merged again in 2019 with Worthing College.

In 2020, the group reopened Haywards Heath College.

The Chichester College group was rated 'Outstanding' in all areas of the Ofsted inspection framework in March 2020.

== Facilities ==
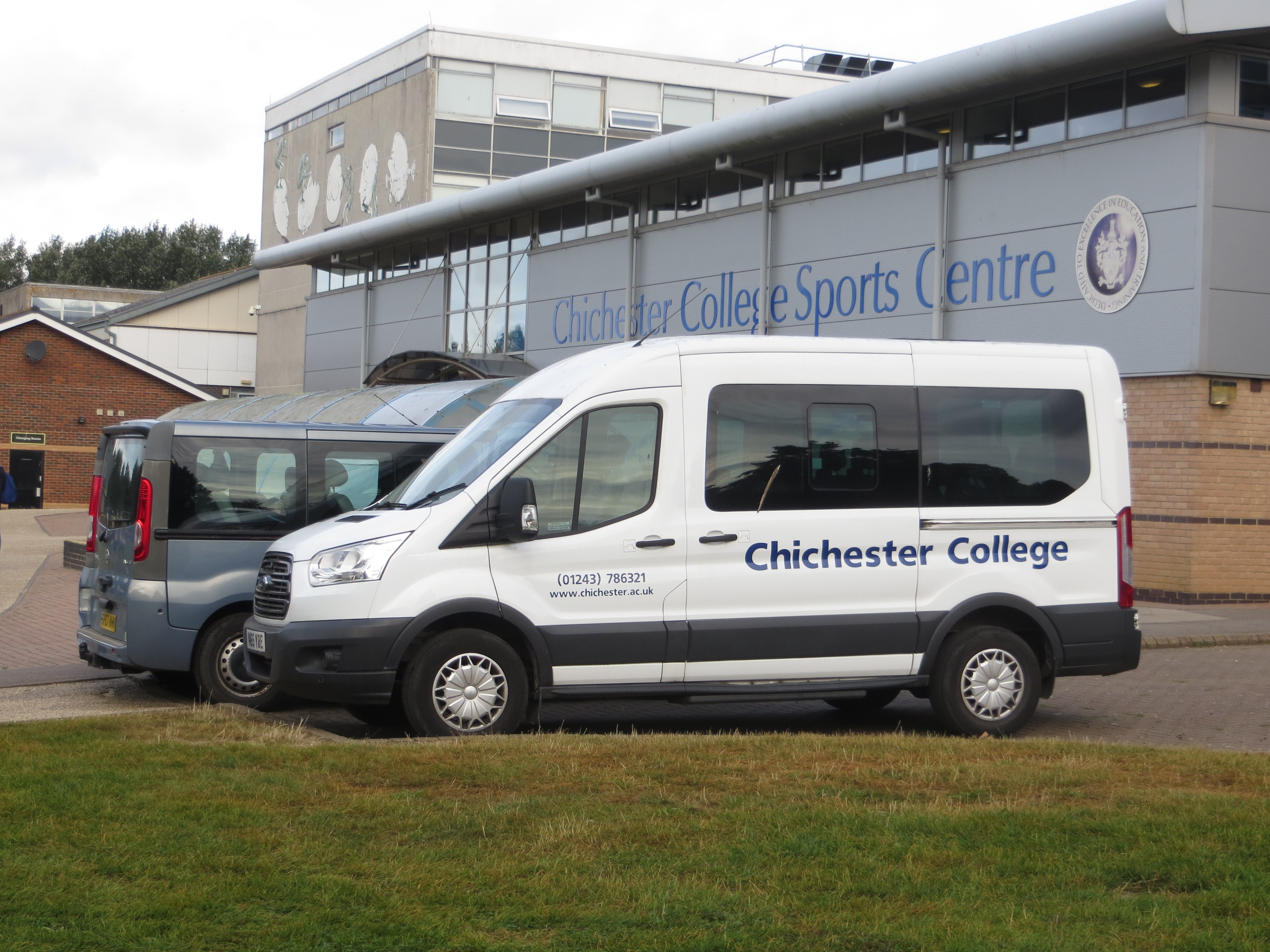
Chichester College Sports Centre and Minibus

Facilities at both campuses include laboratories, classrooms, libraries, computer suites, and specific facilities for vocational courses such as:

- Management & Business Studies Department
- Computer Studies Department
- iMedia rooms, art studios, a photography dark room and an exhibition space
- First Steps nurseries, a chain of children's nurseries owned by the college
- Anglia Examinations, a subsidiary company that organises English exams for international students
- Burlington English language room and other language labs
- Gas training centre
- 17 hairdressing and beauty therapy salons
- Training kitchens and two training restaurants: Cafe 19 and Restaurant 64, which is fine dining.
- The Riverside Theatre, recording studios, a recital hall, and many music rehearsal rooms
- Dance and drama studios
- All-weather sports pitch and a Sports Centre, which includes a climbing wall
- Stables, indoor riding school, two outdoor schools (Brinsbury Campus)
- Small animal unit (Brinsbury Campus)
- Dog grooming unit (Brinsbury Campus)
- Motor vehicle and motor cycle workshops
- Forge
- Construction workshops
