= Ed Mitchell =

British journalist and television presenter

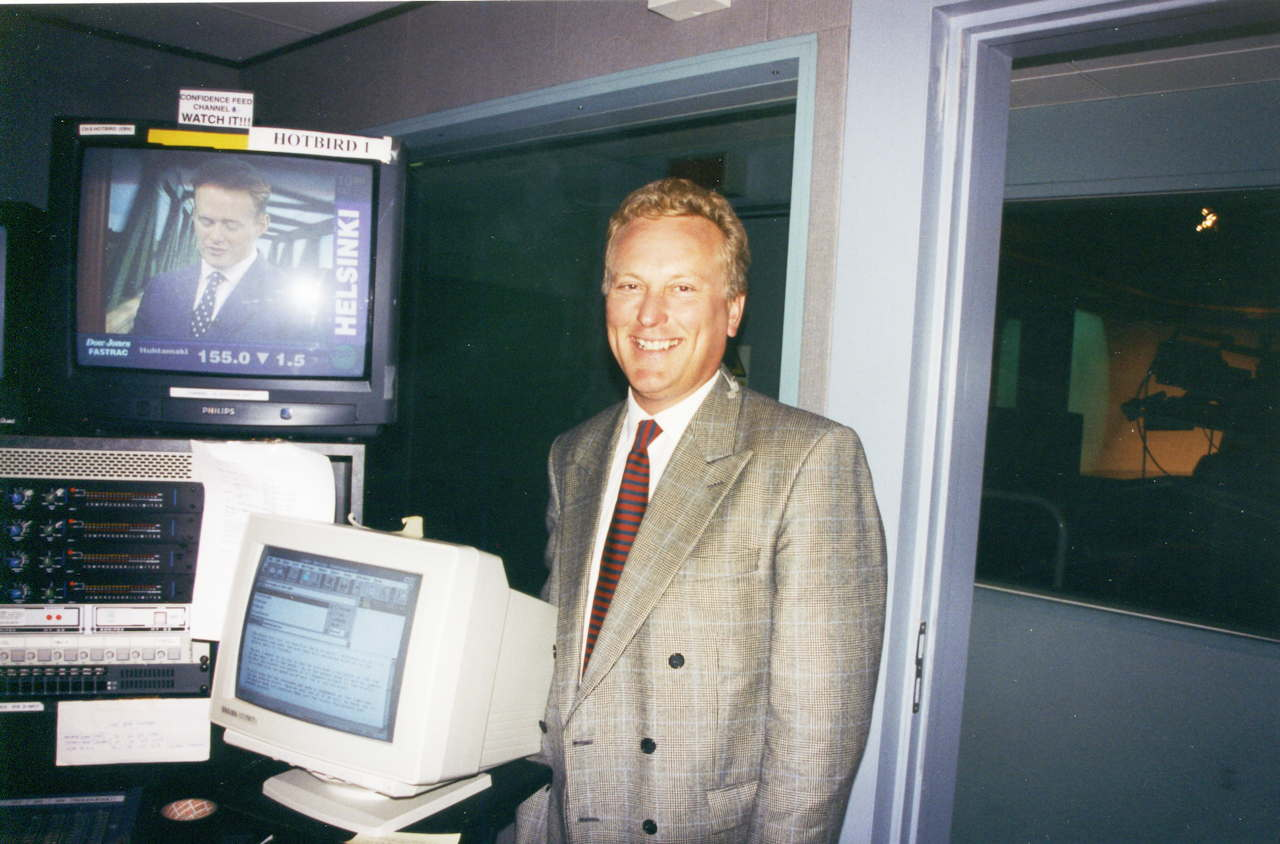
Ed Mitchell at European Business News TV (EBN), London, in 1996.

Edward Frederick Mitchell (born 1953) is a British former television presenter, business journalist and newsreader, best known for his work with ITN. Mitchell was educated at Worthing High School for Boys and Durham University. He also worked for Reuters, BBC News, Channel 4 News, European Business Channel, Asia Business News, European Business News and CNBC Europe in the 1990s until he was made redundant from CNBC in 2000.

In 2007, newspapers revealed that he had become homeless and was sleeping rough on Hove seafront.

On 20 November 2007, he filed for bankruptcy.

In January 2008, an ITV documentary, Saving Ed Mitchell, was shown about his struggle with huge credit card debts, alcoholism and homelessness. The end of the documentary, presented by his ITN colleague Carol Barnes, showed him being given an opportunity to return to presenting if he attended the Priory clinic for rehabilitation. He has successfully continued to abstain from drinking since then. He is the author of the best-selling book, From Headlines to Hard Times, which was published by Blake Publishing in January 2009. He made enough money from the book's sales to eventually move into a flat in Shoreham-by-Sea. A revised and updated paperback was published in 2010.

In November 2014, Mitchell began presenting a daily programme for a new financial radio station, Share Radio, in London.
