= Southern Theatre Arts Centre =

Coordinates: 50.82358°N 0.43143°W

Southern Theatre Arts Centre (STAC)
- Company type: Theatre
- Industry: Theatre
- Founded: 2008
- Headquarters: Durrington, West Sussex
- Website: STAC official website

The Southern Theatre Arts Centre (STAC) is a training venue for performers, technicians and production students, it is based in Durrington, West Sussex, near Worthing, West Sussex, England, about 15 miles from the city of Brighton & Hove. It is a division of Northbrook College and is affiliated with the University of Brighton.

STAC has a range of Theatre Arts Courses from National Diplomas to Foundation Degrees and BA Hons. Its venue Northbrook Theatre regularly hosts touring companies from around the UK and Europe. Productions in recent years include Wild Party, Chess, The Blue Room, Angles in America, Metamorphosis and West. The theatre, which can seat 200 people, is also used for music gigs and open day conferences. In the past STAC worked closely with Prodigal Theatre & The Nightingale Theatre, the patron was Steven Berkoff.

Many past pupils have gone on to work in TV & Film productions such has BBC's Inspector George Gently, Being Human, Britain's Next Top Model, Tracy Beaker Returns, Midsomer Murders, Prince of Persia: The Sands of Time, Hollyoaks, Holby City, Batman Begins, 24: Live Another Day, The Inbetweeners Movie, Extras, and Mission: Impossible – Rogue Nation.

Theatre works include The Chichester Festival Theatre, West End, Broadway, Sydney Opera House, The National Theatre, Birmingham Stage Company, Connaught Theatre, Bristol Old Vic and Cockpit Theatre, Marylebone. Brighton fringe, Southwark Playhouse.
