= Bohunt School Worthing =

Location
- 67a Broadwater Road; Worthing, West Sussex, BN14 8AH; England; 50.8427°N 0.3750°W

Information
- Other name: BSW
- Type: Academy
- Motto: Enjoy, Respect, achieve
- Established: September 2015
- Local authority: West Sussex County Council
- Trust: Bohunt Education Trust
- Department for Education URN: 140424 Tables
- Ofsted: Reports
- Head teacher: Nicole Jones
- Gender: Mixed
- Age range: 11–16
- Enrolment: 922 (2023)
- Capacity: 900
- Colours: Green and black
- Website: www.bohuntworthing.com

Bohunt School Worthing (BSW) is an 11–16 mixed secondary school with academy status in Worthing, West Sussex, England. It was established in September 2016 and is part of the Bohunt Education Trust. The school opened as part of the change of age of transfer arrangements in Worthing, which saw an end to three-tier education in the town.

== History ==
The school was proposed in 2013 as part of West Sussex County Council's plans to reorganise education in Worthing to remove the three-tier structure, following the award of £13 million in funding to provide additional secondary school places in the town. Proposals were invited for a sponsor to open a new school, with five being received. Durrington High School was originally selected as the school's sponsor in partnership with Northbrook College, The Livingstone Foundation Trust and the University of Brighton. However, the school later withdrew its support for the proposals, citing concerns about the funding and the site of the school (It's idea was a collage but its changed to a high school.

In September 2014, the Bohunt Education Trust was selected as the replacement sponsor for the new school. However, in December 2014 it too raised concerns about the site of the school, and indicated that it might pull out of the proposed school. The trust appointed a headteacher to the new school in October 2014, with initial building work beginning in the following February 2015. The school was due to open with approximately 50% of its intended places taken up at around 190 students in the first year.

== Campus ==
The school is being built on part of a site previously owned by Northbrook College in the Broadwater area of Worthing. The site is in a very constrained area, and so no immediate access to sports playing fields are available. The trust and the local authority have undertaken negotiations with Worthing Borough Council to arrange access to the nearby Manor Sports Ground, a public open space, for use by the school. The borough council declined to transfer the ownership of the land to the school, but instead proposed a shared-use arrangement, a new fence was built to keep dogs away from the sports area and a new pedestrian crossing on Broadwater Road which also connects with the southbound bus stop.
