= Geographical (magazine) =

Magazine

- Cover of the September 2016 issue of Geographical Magazine
- Editor: Katie Burton
- Categories: Geography, Science, Nature
- Frequency: Monthly
- Founder: Michael Huxley
- Founded: 1935
- Company: Syon Publishing
- Country: United Kingdom
- Based in: London
- Language: English
- Website: www.geographical.co.uk
- ISSN: 0016-741X

Geographical (formerly The Geographical Magazine) is the magazine of the Royal Geographical Society (with the Institute of British Geographers), a key associate and supporter of many famous expeditions, including those of Charles Darwin, Robert Falcon Scott and Ernest Shackleton. The publishers pay a licence fee to the Society, which is used to fund the advancement of exploration and research and the promotion of geographical knowledge.

The magazine is published monthly, and is sold in retail outlets and on subscription in both print and digital. It contains illustrated articles on people, places, adventure, travel, and environmental issues, as well as summarising the latest academic research and discoveries in geography. Geographical also reports news of the Society's latest work and activities to members and the public.

== History ==
May 1935 issue of The Geographical Magazine, the first ever issue published

The Geographical Magazine was founded by English diplomat Michael Huxley in May 1935. Huxley’s editorial policy was centred on presenting “an understanding of the world that no other periodicals can give”. The original print release of the magazine in 1935 sold out, and a total of 50,000 copies of the first issue were printed. During the first few months of publication the magazine brought its readers stories from Mexico, Tahiti and Ankara, examining different regions in a way that offered both analysis and the traveller’s impression. “There is nothing about this magazine that is not first-rate,” read the issue's review in The Spectator, “and if the standard of the first number can be maintained, it should establish itself both as the most interesting English monthly magazine being published and as an educational factor of considerable importance”. It also noted that The Geographical Magazine contained “illustrations of the kind that can provoke only an astonished rhapsody”.

The Geographical Magazine continued to publish throughout the Second World War, under the editorship of Ivy Davison, despite facing shortages of paper and government censorship. The post-war period saw it expand to accommodate the interpretation of geography as done by geographers into the original founder’s editorial policy. Publishing of the magazine was taken over by The Times in 1956, and then by Odhams in 1965. Eventually the magazine became part of the International Publishing Corporation, and in 1968 the magazine underwent a substantial re-design. In 1981 the publisher changed hands again, with United Newspapers taking control of the magazine, and then by Hyde Park Publications in 1988, when the title was changed from The Geographical Magazine to simply Geographical.

== Staff and Contributors ==
The current editor is Katie Burton. Publishing of the magazine was taken over in 2005 by Syon Publishing which was set up by Graeme Gourlay in 1995.

Notable recent writers have included Nicholas Crane, Christopher Ondaatje, Nick Danziger, Nick Middleton and Vitali Vitaliev, while the magazine has also interviewed numerous significant figures from the world of geography and travel, such as David Attenborough, Jane Goodall, Edmund Hillary, Paul Theroux and Michael Palin.

== Reception ==
Robin Hanbury-Tenison said “I have watched Geographical through many incarnations over the years. It goes from strength to strength and has never been in better heart.”

Sir Ranulph Fiennes praised the magazine, stating “This magazine is a valuable resource as well as an enjoyable read. I really like the balance of interest, serious articles and brilliant photography.”

== Spin-offs ==
In the summer of 2016, Geographical launched a quarterly spin off publication on travel entitled Geographical Expeditions., a “magazine for travellers” and “provide[s] context and reference to make your adventures more enjoyable”.
