= Claire Phillips (artist) =

British portrait artist (born 1963)

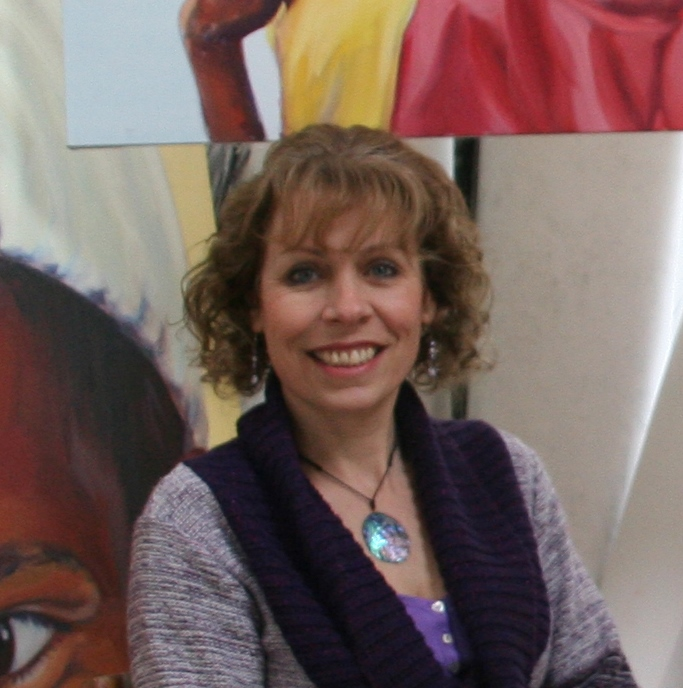
- Claire Phillips in her studio in 2013
- Born: 1963 (age 62–63); Hammersmith, England
- Known for: Portrait Painting
- Notable work: Prisoner of Conscience, Sir Charles Wheeler, Boris Johnson, Kailash Satyarthi – Speaker of Truth

Claire Phillips (born 1963 in Hammersmith, England) is a British portrait artist, whose paintings generally have a social or political narrative. Her portraits of prisoners on death row and children rescued from slave labour have received wide media coverage.

== Education ==
Phillips was educated at Brunel University London (1982–1986) and Northbrook College in West Sussex (1999–2004).

== Works ==
Prisoner of Conscience portrait of Clive Stafford Smith OBE

Phillips is a social narrative portrait painter. Her works tell stories about the subjects, encouraging the viewer to consider social and political themes.

In 2005, she completed her painting Prisoner of Conscience, a portrait of Clive Stafford Smith OBE, founder of the British human rights charity, Reprieve. During her meetings with Stafford Smith she was inspired to explore issues around the death penalty in the US.

In 2007, funded by the Arts Council England, she travelled to the US to meet with people impacted in different ways by the death penalty in that country. In 2009, she exhibited a series of portraits at The Oxo Tower in London centred on this theme. The exhibition, The Human Face of Death Row was facilitated by Reprieve, and subsequently toured in the UK. During research for the exhibition, she met with Dr Don Cabana, who along with Stafford Smith had appeared in Fourteen Days in May, a 1987 BBC documentary showing the last fortnight in the life of Edward Earl Johnson before he was executed in the gas chamber in Mississippi State Penitentiary. Phillips subsequently completed portraits of both Cabana and Johnson, which were included in the exhibition. On the same trip she also met with Linda Carty, a British national held on death row in Texas. Her portrait of Carty has subsequently been used regularly in national and international campaigning for Carty's exoneration. She also met with Krishna Maharaj, a Trinidad and Tobago–born British businessman, who was incarcerated in Florida from 1987 until his death in 2024, for first degree murder and kidnapping. Maharaj has always denied committing the crime and repeated this denial to Phillips during their meeting.

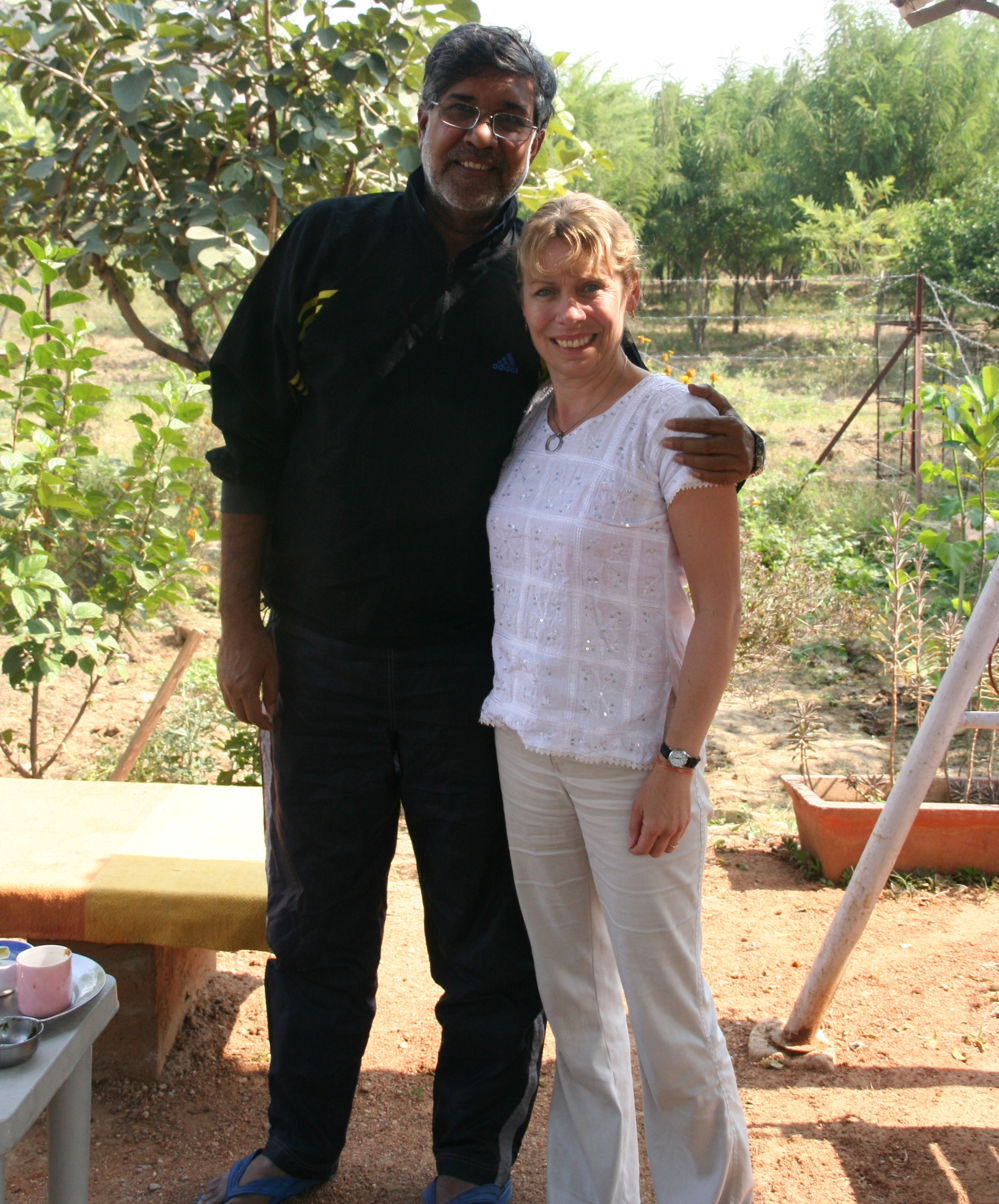
Claire Phillips, with Nobel Peace Prize winner, Kailash Satyarthi, in October 2011

In July 2010, Phillips was inspired by an article in the British Sunday Times to investigate the issue of child labour and trafficking. She was reported as being troubled by Western reactions to the practice and so in October 2011 she travelled to India to meet with Kailash Satyarthi, the Nobel Peace Prize winner and founder of the Indian charity Bachpan Bachao Andolanon (BBA), which rescues children from slave labour. Working closely with BBA, she began researching the issue, interviewing, sketching and photographing dozens of children and rescue workers. Satyarthi spoke on the issue of child labour at the resulting exhibition, which ran from 9–27 July 2014 at the Oxo Tower in London. The exhibition included a portrait of Satyarthi., which Phillips entitled Kailash Satyarthi – Speaker of Truth. Following the London run the exhibition moved on to Worthing Museum and Art Gallery from 13 September 2014 until 24 January 2015.

In December 2011 she completed a portrait of the then London Mayor and future British Prime Minister, Boris Johnson, and her earlier portrait of the British journalist, Sir Charles Wheeler was purchased by Horsham Museum in West Sussex.

Her work is also held in private collections in the UK and Europe.

In July 2025, Phillips was reported to be working on a new project focused on extraordinary achievements by older people. Included in the cohort of people Phillips intends to paint for this latest project are British masters triathlete Daphne Belt and veteran slalom water skier Celia Kent.

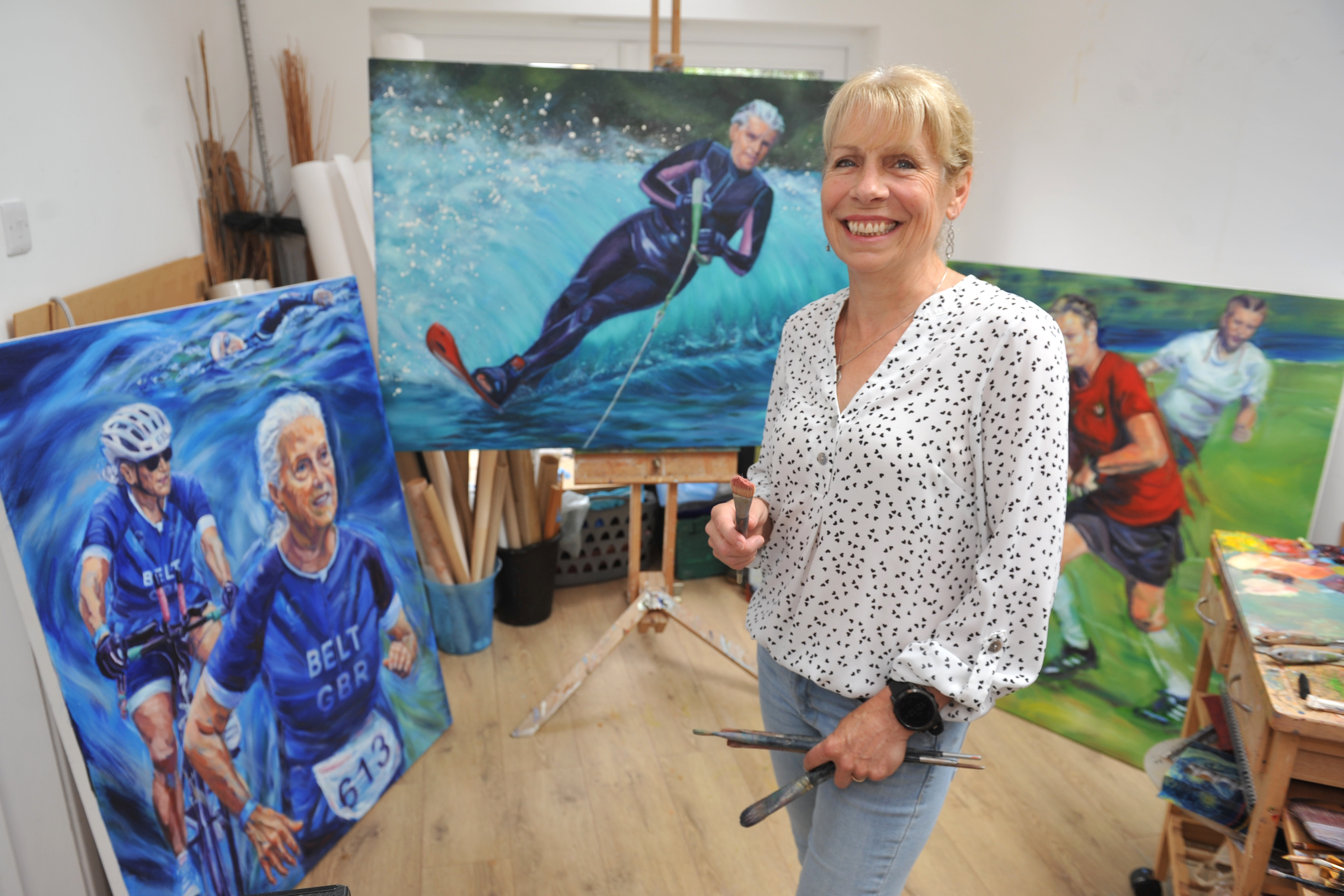
Claire Phillips in her studio in July 2025, together with paintings from her latest project on extraordinary older people
