= Northbrook College =

College of further and higher education in West Sussex, England

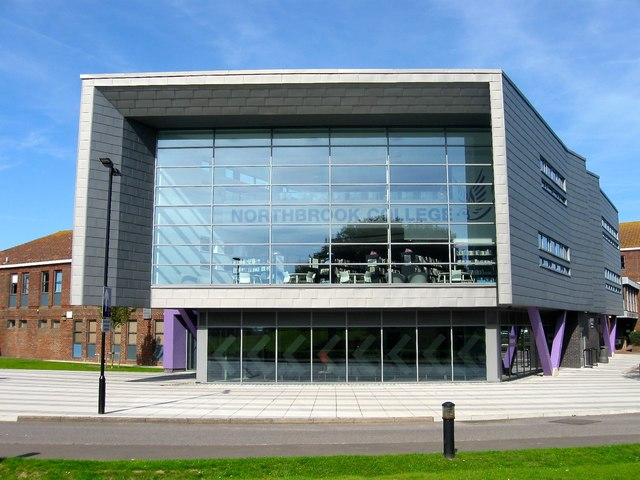
- Learning Resource Centre, West Durrington campus, Worthing
- Type: Public
- Established: By 1890 – Worthing School of Art and Science 1912 – West Sussex College of Art and Design; 1986 – Northbrook College; 2017 – Greater Brighton Metropolitan College 2022 – affiliated to the Chichester College Group
- Affiliations: Chichester College Group; University of the Arts, London; University of Brighton
- Principal: Helena Thomas
- Administrative staff: 1,000
- Students: 16,000
- Location: Worthing, England, United Kingdom; 50.824°N 0.432°W
- Campus: Suburban
- Website: https://www.northbrook.ac.uk/

Northbrook College is a further education and higher education college that is part of the Chichester College Group.

It currently has three campuses: Broadwater Campus and West Durrington Campus in Worthing and Shoreham Airport Campus in Shoreham-by-Sea, although in 2024 it announced its intention to sell the 2.4-ha (5.9-acre) Broadwater Campus which would be closed in 2025, with learning consolidated across the West Durington site and Worthing College's site in Broadwater.

It was founded in or before 1890 as the Worthing School of Art and Science.

The college is the largest provider of higher education for the creative and cultural industries in West Sussex. It is also a significant provider of higher education in a variety of other work-related areas.

The college also has contracts for apprenticeship training and adult and community learning, and provides courses in most work-related areas as well as those for personal development.

The college's creative degrees, including fashion, photography and media in Worthing are validated by the University of the Arts London and its Motorsport courses in Shoreham are validated by the University of Brighton.

== History ==
Founded as the Worthing School of Arts and Science by 1890, it became the leading art college in West Sussex and was renamed the West Sussex College of Art & Design in 1912. Following a merger with Worthing Technical College and Chelsea College of Aeronautical and Automobile Engineering in 1986 it was renamed Northbrook College. In 2017 Northbrook merged with City College Brighton & Hove to create a unified college under the name Greater Brighton Metropolitan College (MET). Since 2022 Northbrook College has been part of the Chichester College Group after Greater Brighton Metropolitan College merged with the existing members of the group, including Worthing College, to become the largest college group in Sussex and one of the largest in the UK.

As of 2024 the college's principal, Helena Thomas, is also principal of Worthing College.

== Facilities ==
The West Durrington campus is home to the Southern Theatre Arts Centre, providing theatre courses ranging from National Diplomas to Foundation Degrees and BA Hons, which like all Northbrook's higher education courses are affiliated with the University of Brighton. Its venue, The Northbrook Theatre, is a professional theatre that regularly hosts touring companies from around the UK and Europe. Productions in recent years include Wild Party, Chess, The Blue Room, Angels in America, Metamorphosis and West.

== Notable alumni ==
- Jamie Hewlett, comic book artist and co-creator of the comic Tank Girl and co-creator of the virtual band Gorillaz
- Mike Kerr, vocalist and lead guitarist of Royal Blood
- Alan Martin, comic book writer and co-creator of the comic Tank Girl
- Luke Newton, actor
- Paul Norris, Oscar winner in Visual Effects for the film Ex Machina.
- Claire Phillips, British portrait artist
- Leo Sayer, singer-songwriter and musician
- Hilary Stratton, Sculptor and teacher (West Sussex College of Art & Design)
- Sunset Strippers, electronic music band
- Pearl Thompson, musician and artist, guitarist with The Cure
- Nick Waplington, artist and photographer
