= Greater Brighton Metropolitan College =

Public college in West Sussex, UK

- Type: Public
- Active: 2017–2022
- Students: 12,800
- Undergraduates: 1,000
- Location: Brighton, Worthing, England, United Kingdom
- Campus: Pelham Street, Brighton West Durrington, Worthing Shoreham Airport
- Website: http://www.gbmc.ac.uk

Greater Brighton Metropolitan College was a large further education college based in Brighton, Worthing and Shoreham-by-Sea in Sussex on the south coast of England.

It was formed in early 2017 by the merger of Brighton-based City College Brighton & Hove and Worthing-based Northbrook College. The merger was brought together by Nick Jubb who was on the board of Northbrook and CEO/Principle of City College Brighton.

After continuing financial issues and the surprise departure or Mr Judd the CEO of Chichester College Group took over as interim head.

Chichester College Group, who operate as a federation of colleges in West Sussex took over Greater Brighton Metropolitan College on 1 August 2022 returning the Northbrook brand back as a stand alone college within the federation and restabilising City College, Brighton under the Brighton MET (Metropolitan College) brand
