= Chichester College Group =

Further education college group in Sussex, England

Location
- Westgate Fields; Chichester, West Sussex, PO19 1SB; United Kingdom

Information
- Established: 2017
- Ofsted: Reports
- Principal: Andrew Green
- Gender: Co-educational
- Age: 16+
- Enrolment: 25,000+
- Language: English
- Campus: Chichester College; Crawley College; Brinsbury College; Worthing College; Haywards Heath College; Brighton MET College; Northbrook College; BN1 Arts;
- Campus type: Multi-site
- Nickname: CCG
- Website: https://www.chigroup.ac.uk

Chichester College Group (CCG) is a group of further education colleges based in West Sussex and Brighton and Hove, England. It is one of the largest providers of further education in the south-east of England, educating more than 25,000 students each year across multiple campuses. The group operates several colleges as well as associated educational services including First Steps Childcare and Anglia Examinations.

The group expanded significantly through a series of mergers, including the incorporation of Crawley College in 2017 and Worthing College in 2019. In August 2022 the group merged with Greater Brighton Metropolitan College, bringing Brighton MET College and Northbrook College into the organisation.

The Chichester College Group was rated "Outstanding" in all areas by Ofsted following an inspection in March 2020. This was downgraded by Ofsted to Good in February 2025.

== Colleges and services ==
The group consists of seven colleges and several education-related organisations.

=== Chichester College ===
Chichester College is a further education college located in Chichester, West Sussex. Established in 1964, it offers a wide range of academic and vocational courses including A levels, BTEC qualifications, apprenticeships, and higher education programmes. The college also operates a campus at Brinsbury College focused on land-based education.

=== Crawley College ===
Crawley College is a further education institution in Crawley, West Sussex. It provides vocational education, apprenticeships, adult education and some higher education courses. The college became part of the Chichester College Group following the merger with Central Sussex College in 2017.

=== Brinsbury College ===
Brinsbury College is a specialist land-based campus located near Pulborough in West Sussex. Situated within the South Downs National Park, the campus includes working farms, equine facilities and woodland areas used for teaching agriculture, animal management and countryside management. The college forms part of Chichester College and the wider Chichester College Group.

=== Worthing College ===
Worthing College is a sixth form college located in Worthing, West Sussex. Established in 1973, it primarily offers academic courses including A levels for students aged 16–18, as well as a range of enrichment and extracurricular programmes.

=== Haywards Heath College ===
Haywards Heath College is a sixth form college located in Haywards Heath, West Sussex. The college opened in 2020 as part of the Chichester College Group and provides academic and vocational programmes primarily for students aged 16–18.

=== Brighton MET College ===
Brighton MET College (Brighton Metropolitan College) is a further education college in Brighton and Brighton and Hove. Founded in 1858, it offers vocational training, apprenticeships and academic courses across campuses in central and east Brighton. The college joined the Chichester College Group following the 2022 merger with Greater Brighton Metropolitan College.

=== Northbrook College ===
Northbrook College is a further and higher education college based in Worthing and Shoreham-by-Sea. The college has a strong focus on creative industries, performing arts and technical training, and offers degree-level courses validated by the University of the Arts London and the University of Brighton. It joined the Chichester College Group in 2022 following the dissolution of Greater Brighton Metropolitan College.

=== First Steps Childcare ===
First Steps Childcare is a childcare provider operated by the Chichester College Group. The organisation runs a network of nurseries linked to the group’s colleges and provides early years education as well as training opportunities for childcare and early years students.

=== Anglia Examinations ===
Anglia Examinations is an international English language examination organisation operated by the Chichester College Group. It provides English language assessments and qualifications for learners around the world and works with schools and education providers internationally.

== See also ==
- Further education
- List of further education colleges in England
- Education in England
