= Mowbray, West Sussex =

Coordinates: 51.092277°N 0.30077457°W

Mowbray
- Location within West Sussex
- OS grid reference: TQ190339
  - London: 27 miles (43 km) NNE
- District: Horsham
- Shire county: West Sussex
- Region: South East
- Country: England
- Sovereign state: United Kingdom
- Post town: Horsham
- Postcode district: RH12
- Dialling code: 01403
- Police: Sussex
- Fire: West Sussex
- Ambulance: South East Coast
- UK Parliament: Horsham

Mowbray (also known as Mowbray Village) is a large new community on the northern edge of Horsham, West Sussex. Outline planning for the site, on former agricultural land, was granted in 2017, with the project being led by the financial services and asset management group Legal & General, which took over the land in 2019 after permission was originally granted to developer Liberty Property Trust.

== Development ==
The masterplan divides the site into three phases – Mowbray Village, Mowbray West, and Mowbray East – and is expected to deliver approximately 2,750 homes across a variety of tenures, alongside 500,000 sq ft of employment space, a supermarket and a sports campus. Phase One, the central section known as Mowbray Village itself, has permission for around 1,000 homes along with Bohunt Horsham school, commercial space, extra care housing, and community and green space.

Housebuilder Cala Homes has been responsible for delivering the first homes on the site, with an initial 596 homes, and launched its Furzefield development in 2024. Other developers on the site include Dandara, which began a new phase in partnership with housing association Saxon Weald, including 28 affordable homes, as part of a wider scheme combining established infrastructure, green open space and transport connectivity.

== Infrastructure and schools ==
Bohunt Horsham School was the first building completed on the site, opening to pupils in January 2022, with eventual capacity for 1,620 pupils aged 4 to 16 plus a 50-place nursery. A footbridge over the A264 opened in April 2022, providing pedestrians and cyclists in Horsham with safe access to the school and the wider development. Road works to create a new junction serving the development's business park and sports hub led West Sussex Highways to permanently reduce the speed limit on the A264 between the Rusper Road and Moorhead roundabouts to 50 mph.

== Etymology ==
The name Mowbray derives from Geoffrey de Montbray, an adviser to William the Conqueror. His descendants became entrusted with the manor of Horsham in the 14th century after marrying into the de Braose family, who had originally been granted the manor by William the Conqueror. The developers chose the name as a reference to this strand of Horsham's history.
