= Runcton =

Village in West Sussex, England

Coordinates: 50.81505°N 0.7514°W

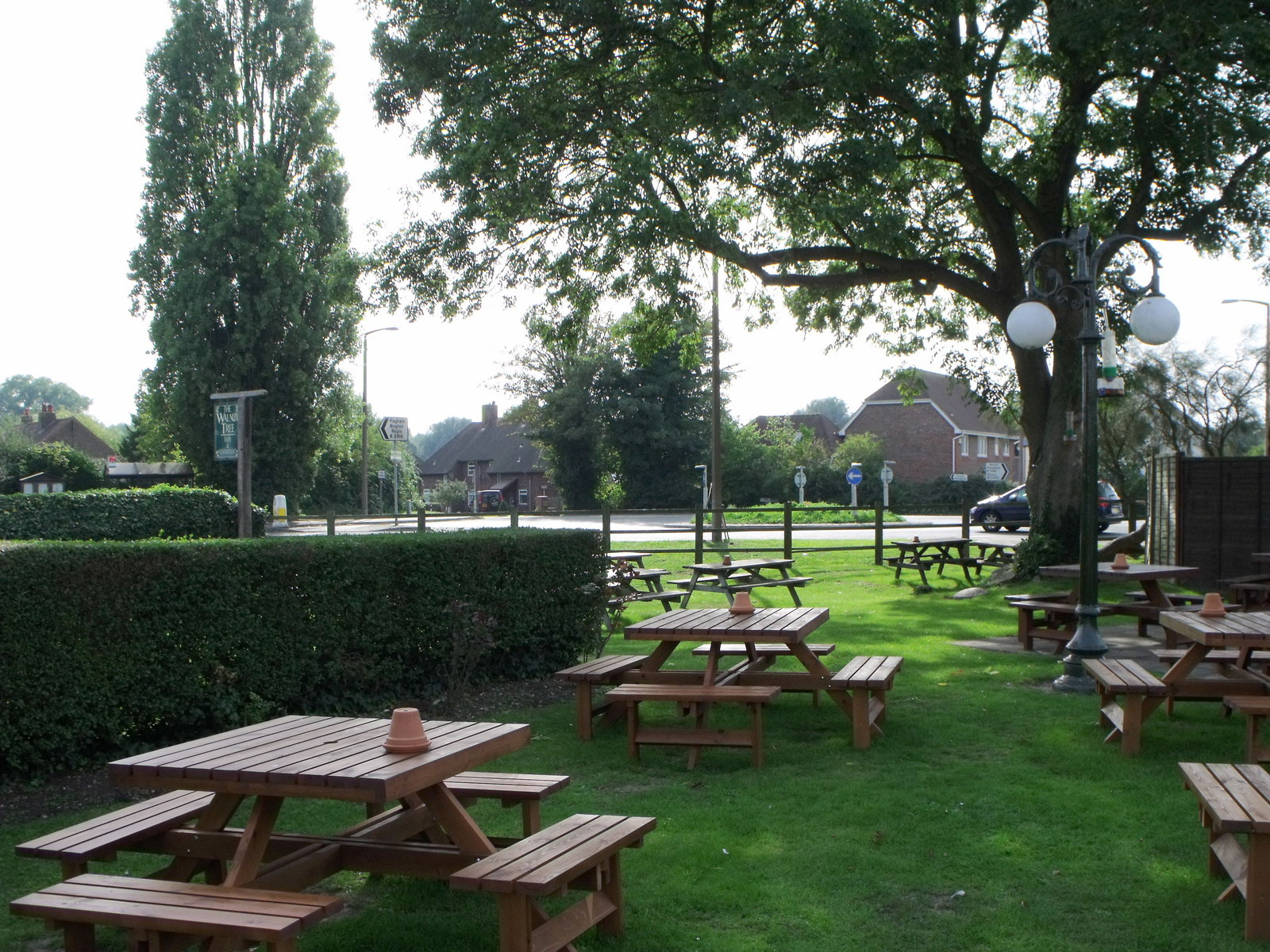
- The Walnut Tree pub garden

- Location within West Sussex
- OS grid reference: SU880024
- Civil parish: North Mundham
- District: Chichester
- Shire county: West Sussex
- Region: South East
- Country: England
- Sovereign state: United Kingdom
- Post town: Chichester
- Postcode district: PO20
- Police: Sussex
- Fire: West Sussex
- Ambulance: South East Coast
- UK Parliament: Chichester

Runcton is a village in the Chichester district of West Sussex, England. It lies on the B2166 road 1.9 miles (3.1 km) southeast of Chichester.

In the 2011 census the population of the hamlet was included in the civil parish of North Mundham.

The village includes a farm shop, garden centre, a pub The Walnut Tree, nearby North Mundham primary school and Chichester Free School.

== History ==
Runcton was a significant settlement in the ancient hundred of Boxgrove and was listed in the Domesday survey of 1086 as having 26 households (six villagers, five slaves and 15 cottagers). Resources included ploughing lands, two mills and a fishery.

Prior to 1086, the Norman lord Roger of Montgomery, Earl of Shrewsbury and Chichester, gave the manor of Runcton to the Norman abbey of Troarn: in 1260, Bruton Priory in Somerset took over all the English lands of Troarn abbey. After the dissolution of the monasteries in the 1530s, Thomas Bowyer bought the manor of Runcton and joined it with the manor of North Mundham.

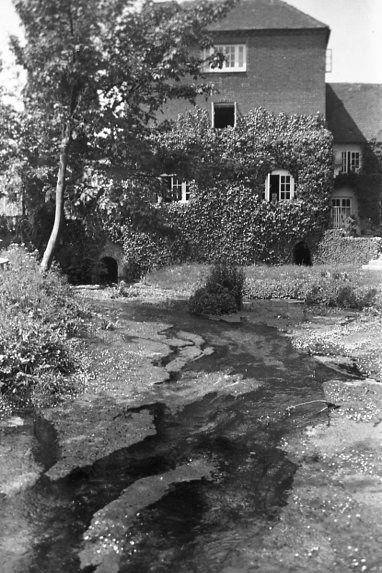
Runcton Mill (1949)

In 1848, the hamlet of Runcton had 98 inhabitants.

== Listed buildings ==
Runcton Manor is a Grade II-listed house on Runcton Lane: the main front part is a Regency era building, from the late 18th/early 19th century, with an older building to the rear.

There are four other listed buildings: Severals (II*), Springdale Cottage, Runcton Manor, Runcton Mill and Runcton Cottage.

== Amenities ==
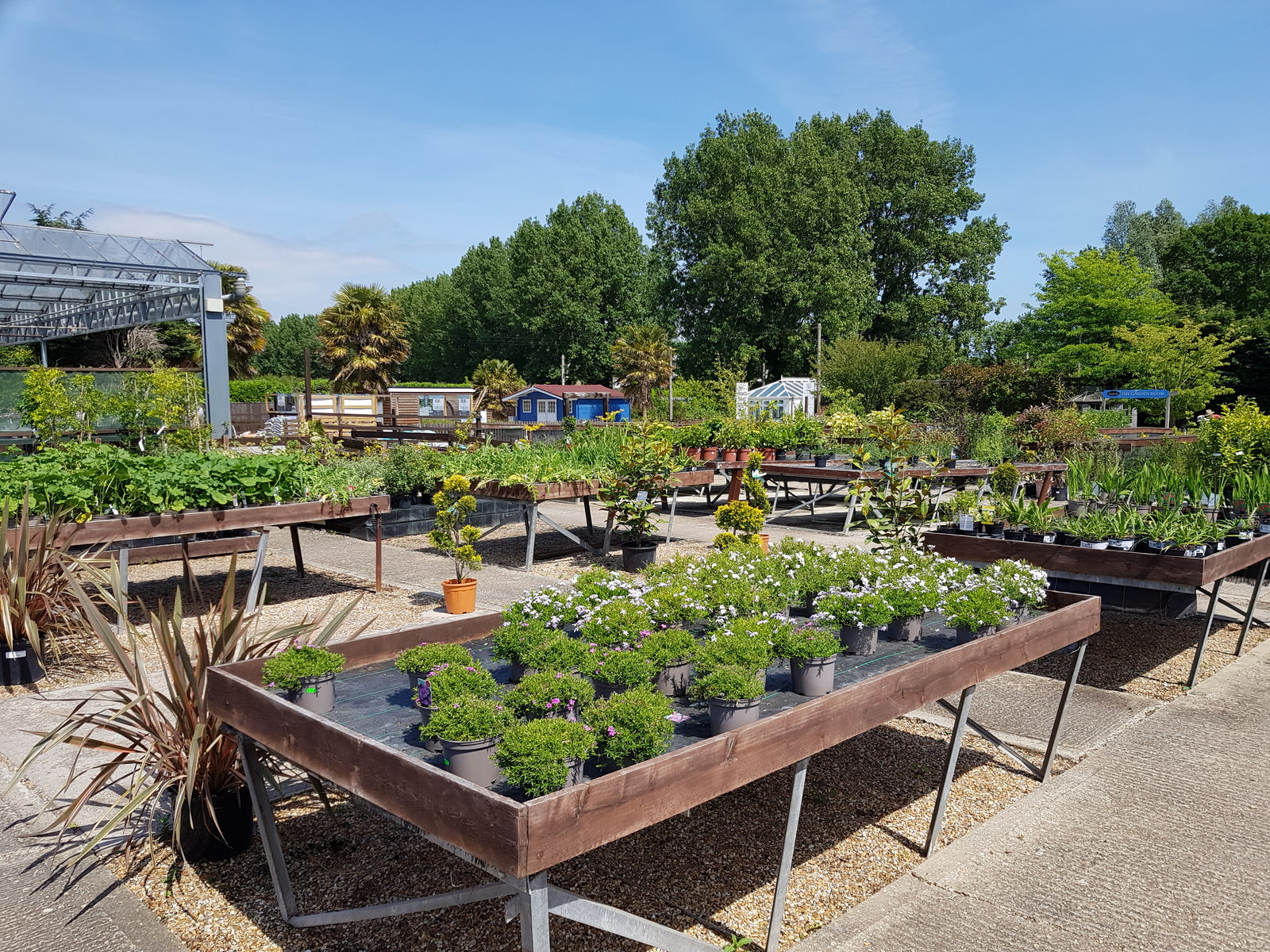
Manor Nurseries (2020)

Local amenities including a farm shop, garden centre, a pub The Walnut Tree, nearby North Mundham primary school and Chichester Free School.
