= Bohunt Horsham =

Location
- Bailey Road, Horsham, West Sussex, RH12 6AP; England; 51.091336°N 0.298407°W

Information
- School type: Free school
- Motto: Enjoy, Respect, Achieve
- Established: 1 September 2019
- Local authority: West Sussex
- Trust: Bohunt Education Trust (BET)
- Department for Education URN: 147187 Tables
- Ofsted: Reports
- Head teacher: Georgette Ayling
- Staff: 9 teaching, 7 support
- Gender: Coeducational
- Age: 4 to 16
- Capacity: 1620
- Colors: Green and Black
- Website: www.bohunthorsham.com

Bohunt Horsham is a coeducational all-through school located in Horsham, West Sussex, England. The school opened to 120 students in Year 7 in 2019 in temporary accommodation near the centre of Horsham and a new, purpose-built school was opened at Mowbray, north of the town, in 2022 Eventually the school will take 1620 students from ages 4–16, and will include a nursery with provision for 50 places. Bohunt School Horsham is funded by the Department for Education as a free school. The school is sponsored by the Bohunt Education Trust, led by Bohunt School in Liphook, Hampshire.

== Opening in 2019 & Temporary Site ==
The new school is the third newly opened school by the Bohunt Education Trust. It opened in a temporary site in Hurst Road, Horsham in September 2019, with 120 students joining in the first year. The trust announced the Head Teacher in November 2018.

== Permanent Site ==
The school relocated to the Mowbray development off Rusper Road in 2022. This is part of a wider development north of Horsham, including up to 2,750 homes, a business park, and sports facilities.
