= South Mundham =

Hamlet in West Sussex, England

Coordinates: 50.79551°N 0.7555°W

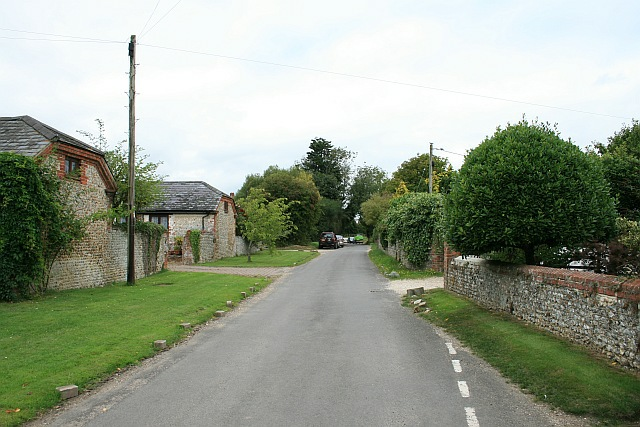
- Manor Lane

- Location within West Sussex
- OS grid reference: SU878002
- Civil parish: North Mundham
- District: Chichester
- Shire county: West Sussex
- Region: South East
- Country: England
- Sovereign state: United Kingdom
- Police: Sussex
- Fire: West Sussex
- Ambulance: South East Coast
- UK Parliament: Chichester

South Mundham is a hamlet in the Chichester district of West Sussex, England. It lies in isolated countryside to the north of Pagham Harbour 1.2 miles (2 km) south of North Mundham, its larger neighbour.
