= The Gatwick School =

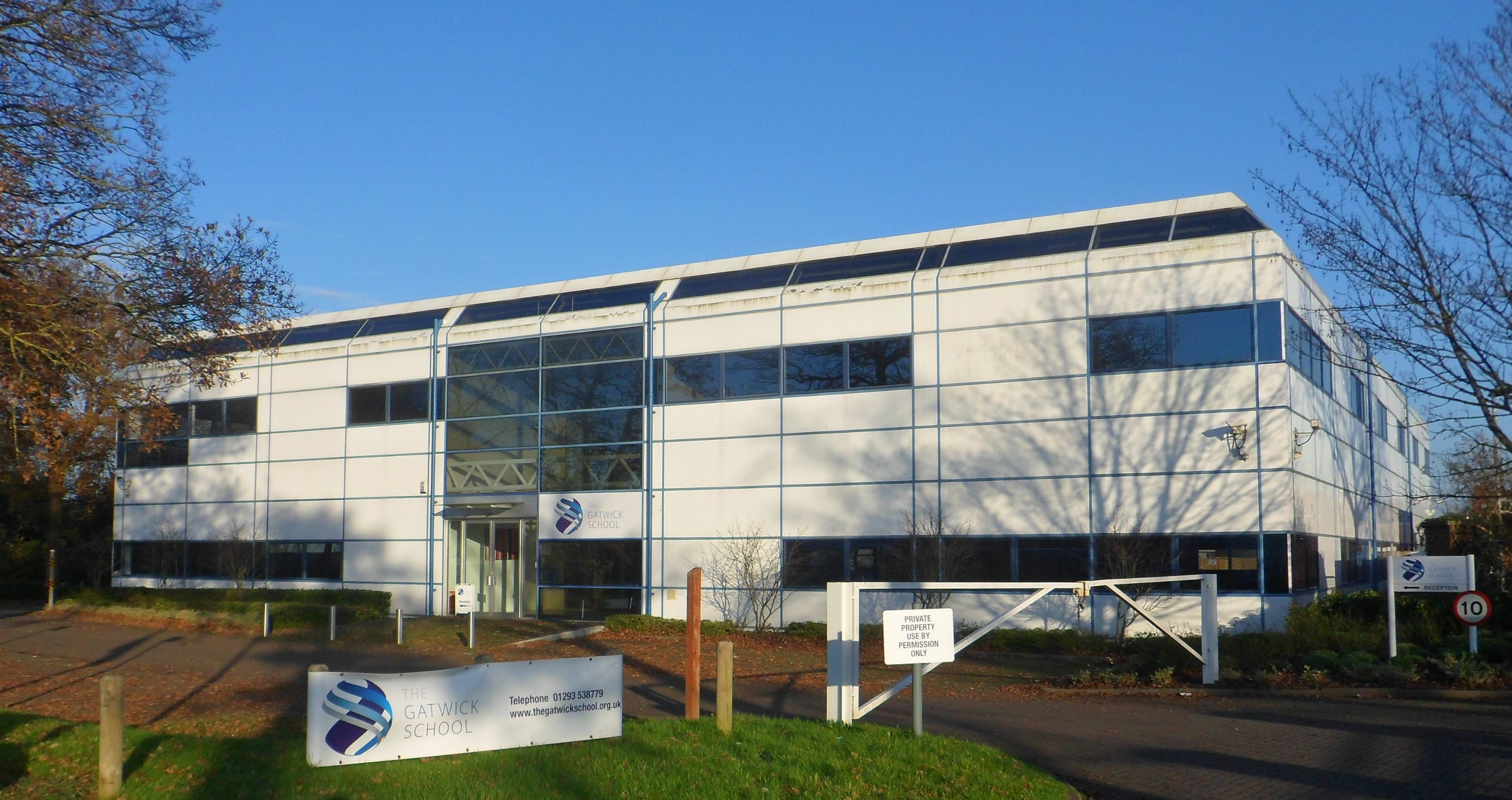

Location
- 23 Gatwick Road; Crawley, West Sussex, RH10 9TP; England; 51°08′17″N 0°09′50″W

Information
- Type: Free school
- Motto: Choices / Chance / Culture
- Established: 2014
- Local authority: West Sussex
- Department for Education URN: 141038 Tables
- Ofsted: Reports
- Headteacher: David Marillat
- Gender: Mixed
- Age: 4 to 16
- Enrolment: As of 2025: 885
- Capacity: As of 2025: 1020
- Website: http://www.gatwickschool.org.uk

The Gatwick School is an all-through free school located on the Manor Royal estate, on the northern outskirts of Crawley, just south of the Gatwick Airport perimeter. It is a non-denominational, co-educational school and one of seven run by Aurora Academies Trust. It was rated 'good' by Ofsted in its 2024 inspection.

== Historical development ==
The Gatwick School opened in September 2014 with an initial intake of 60 reception pupils and 30 Year 7 students located in a former office building which subsequently underwent a £9 million refurbishment by Willmott Dixon.

However, the school was not granted permanent planning permission by Crawley Borough Council until February 2021, having previously operated under temporary permissions since its inception. The decision followed earlier refusals due to concerns about traffic and parking, which were addressed in the subsequent, successful application. The application had also been opposed by the Manor Royal Business Group which was against any non-business development within the Manor Royal.

== Headteachers ==
- Simon Ruscoe-Price - from 2014
- Mark Roessler - from 2016
- Bianca Greenhalgh - from 2020
- Simon Firth - from 2022
- David Marillat - from 2023
