= Chichester Free School =

Location
- Hunston Road; Chichester, West Sussex, PO20 1NP; England; 50°49′23″N 0°45′04″W

Information
- Type: Free school
- Motto: Nurture · Challenge · Inspire
- Established: 2013
- Local authority: West Sussex
- Department for Education URN: 139668 Tables
- Ofsted: Reports
- Chair of Governors: Helen Humphry
- Principal: James Garner
- Gender: Coed
- Age: 4 to 16
- Enrolment: 1020
- Houses: 4
- Website: http://www.chichesterfreeschool.org.uk/

Chichester Free School is a mixed-sex free school located in Chichester, West Sussex, England. It opened in 2013 and caters for students aged 4–16 years. The school is located on the newly re-developed Carmelite convent site, which was damaged in a fire in 2009.

== Academic performance ==
In 2019, 34% of pupils achieved Grade 5+ in English and Maths GCSEs, compared to 43% nationally and locally. The school's Attainment 8 Score was 44, compared to 47 nationally and locally. 64% of pupils were entered for the English Baccalaureate, compared to 40% nationally and locally.

== Ofsted judgements ==
In June 2015, the school had its first Ofsted inspection, when the school was judged to be Good. The inspectors noted that the school benefited from several strong senior and middle leaders who were highly committed and were effectively raising standards across the school; other leaders were not as strong and there was no leadership training. Teaching in the primary phase was weaker than in the secondary phase.

The school was inspected again in 2019 and again judged Good.
