= Broadwater, West Sussex =

Area of Worthing, West Sussex, England

Coordinates: 50.82819°N 0.3742°W

Broadwater
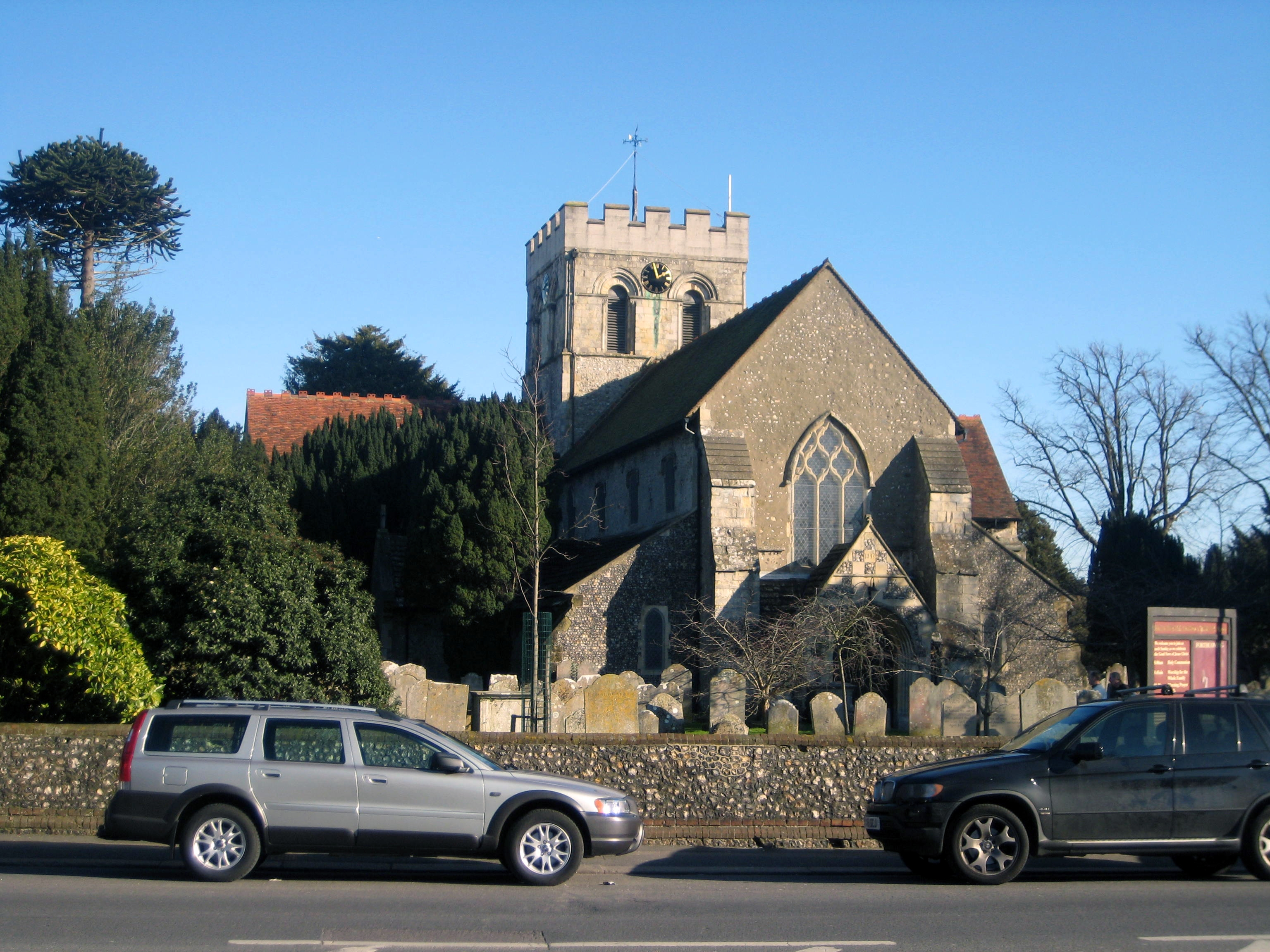
- Broadwater Church

- Location within West Sussex
- Population: 9,373 (2011.Ward)
- OS grid reference: TQ145044
- District: Worthing
- Shire county: West Sussex
- Region: South East
- Country: England
- Sovereign state: United Kingdom
- Post town: WORTHING
- Postcode district: BN14 7-9
- Dialling code: 01903
- Police: Sussex
- Fire: West Sussex
- Ambulance: South East Coast
- UK Parliament: East Worthing and Shoreham

Broadwater is a neighbourhood of Worthing, in the borough of Worthing in West Sussex, England. Situated between the South Downs and the English Channel, Broadwater was once a parish in its own right and included Worthing when the latter was a small fishing hamlet. Before its incorporation into the Borough of Worthing in 1902 Broadwater also included the manor of Offington to the north. It borders Tarring to the west, Sompting to the east, and East Worthing to the south-east.

== History ==
In 1931, the civil parish had a population of 1187. On 9 November 1902, the parish was abolished and merged with Worthing, Durrington and Sompting.

St Mary's Church, burial place of the Barons de la Warr, is in Broadwater.

== Education ==
There are nine schools in Broadwater: Broadwater C of E Primary School, Downsbrook Primary School, Springfield Infant School, Whytemead Primary School, Bramber Primary School, the private Lancing College Prep School Worthing (formerly Broadwater Manor School), St Andrew's High School, Worthing High, Davison High School and Bohunt School Worthing.

== Notable people ==
- Walter Dew (1863–1947), police officer
- William Henry Hudson (1841–1922), author, naturalist and ornithologist
- Richard Jefferies (1848–1877), nature writer
- Ann Thwaytes (1789–1866), philanthropist
