= North Mundham =

Village and parish in West Sussex, England

Coordinates: 50.8139°N 0.75871°W

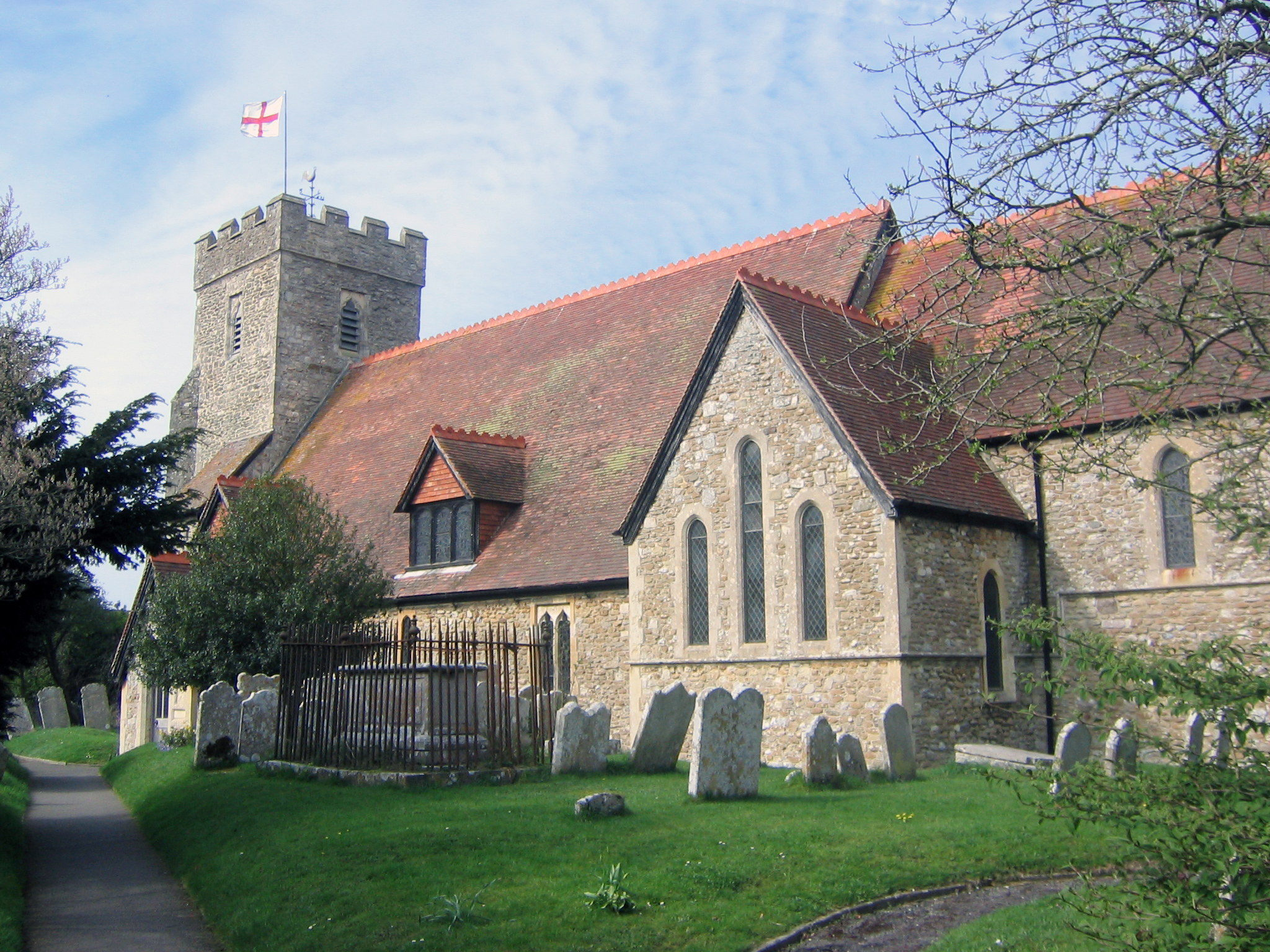
- Church of St. Stephen

- Location within West Sussex
- Area: 10.27 km^{2} (3.97 sq mi)
- Population: 1,201. 2011 Census including Runcton
  - Density: 114/km^{2} (300/sq mi)
- OS grid reference: SU875023
  - London: 55 miles (89 km) NNE
- Civil parish: North Mundham
- District: Chichester
- Shire county: West Sussex
- Region: South East
- Country: England
- Sovereign state: United Kingdom
- Post town: CHICHESTER
- Postcode district: PO20
- Dialling code: 01243
- Police: Sussex
- Fire: West Sussex
- Ambulance: South East Coast
- UK Parliament: Chichester

North Mundham is a village, Anglican parish and civil parish in the Chichester district of West Sussex, England. It lies on the B2166 road two miles (3.2 km) southeast of Chichester. The parish includes the village of Runcton. The Anglican parish includes the neighbouring settlements of South Mundham, Runcton and Merston.

== Etymology ==
The earliest known appearance of the name is se northra Mundan ham, which is listed as appurtenant in a charter from AD 680 by which Cædwalla of Wessex gave Pagham to St Wilfrid. Mund is the nominative plural of the Old English word munda, meaning "protector" or "guardian." The suffix -ham is the Old English noun meaning "homestead, village, manor or estate." The suffix -hamm is the Old English for enclosure, land hemmed by water or marsh or higher ground, land in a riverbend, rivermeadow or promontory". Both appear as -ham in modern place-names.

== History ==
Mundham (not distinguishing between North Mundham and South Mundham) was listed in the Domesday Book of 1086 in the Hundred of Stockbridge as having 30 households, plough lands, church and mills, and a value of 8 pounds.

In 1861 the area of the ecclesiastical parish was 1,882 acres (762 ha) and had a population of 426. It included the village of Runcton.

== Listed buildings ==
The parish church, in the Diocese of Chichester, is dedicated to St Stephen and is a Grade II* listed building; it dates from the 13th century, but was largely (apart from the tower) restored in 1883 by Sir Arthur Blomfield.

There are 23 other listed buildings in the parish; four are classified as Grade II*, and the remainder as Grade II.

== Governance ==
An electoral ward in the same name exists. This ward includes Oving with a total ward population taken at the 2011 census of 2,252.
