= Crawley College =

Location
- College Road; Crawley, West Sussex, RH10 1NR; England; 51.1162°N 0.1815°W

Information
- Type: Further education college
- Established: 1958
- Ofsted: Reports
- Principal: Dean Wynter (acting)
- Gender: Mixed
- Age: 16+
- Website: https://www.crawley.ac.uk

Crawley College is a further education college in Crawley, West Sussex, England. It forms the Crawley campus of the Chichester College Group, one of the largest providers of further education in the south-east of England.

The college offers vocational and technical education, apprenticeships, sixth form study and adult education. Some higher education courses are delivered through partnerships with universities including the University of Chichester.

== History ==
The institution originated as Crawley College of Further Education, established in 1958 by West Sussex County Council.

In 1977 it was renamed Crawley College of Technology, reflecting its emphasis on engineering and technical courses.

In August 2005 Crawley College merged with Haywards Heath College to form Central Sussex College.

Central Sussex College later merged with Chichester College in August 2017, after which the Crawley campus was re-established under the name Crawley College within the newly expanded Chichester College Group.

== Campus ==
The main campus is located on College Road in central Crawley. The site includes specialist facilities for engineering, construction, hair and beauty, hospitality and information technology training.

The college building includes an eleven-storey tower block which is one of the tallest buildings in Crawley.

== Enterprise facilities ==
Crawley College operates a number of training businesses open to the public. These include trainee hairdressing and beauty salons operating under the brand Intuition, allowing students to gain practical experience with customers.

== 2021 incident ==
On 26 April 2021 an 18-year-old former student entered the college with an imitation firearm and a knife, causing panic on campus. Two members of staff confronted and subdued him.

In March 2022 he was convicted of possessing an imitation firearm with intent to cause fear of violence and having a bladed article on school premises. He was sentenced to five and a half years in a young offender institution.

== Notable alumni ==
- Liz Byrski, journalist
- Michael Dempsey, bassist with The Cure
- Laura Moffatt, former Labour MP for Crawley

== See also ==
- Chichester College Group
- Further education in England
