= Brighton MET College =

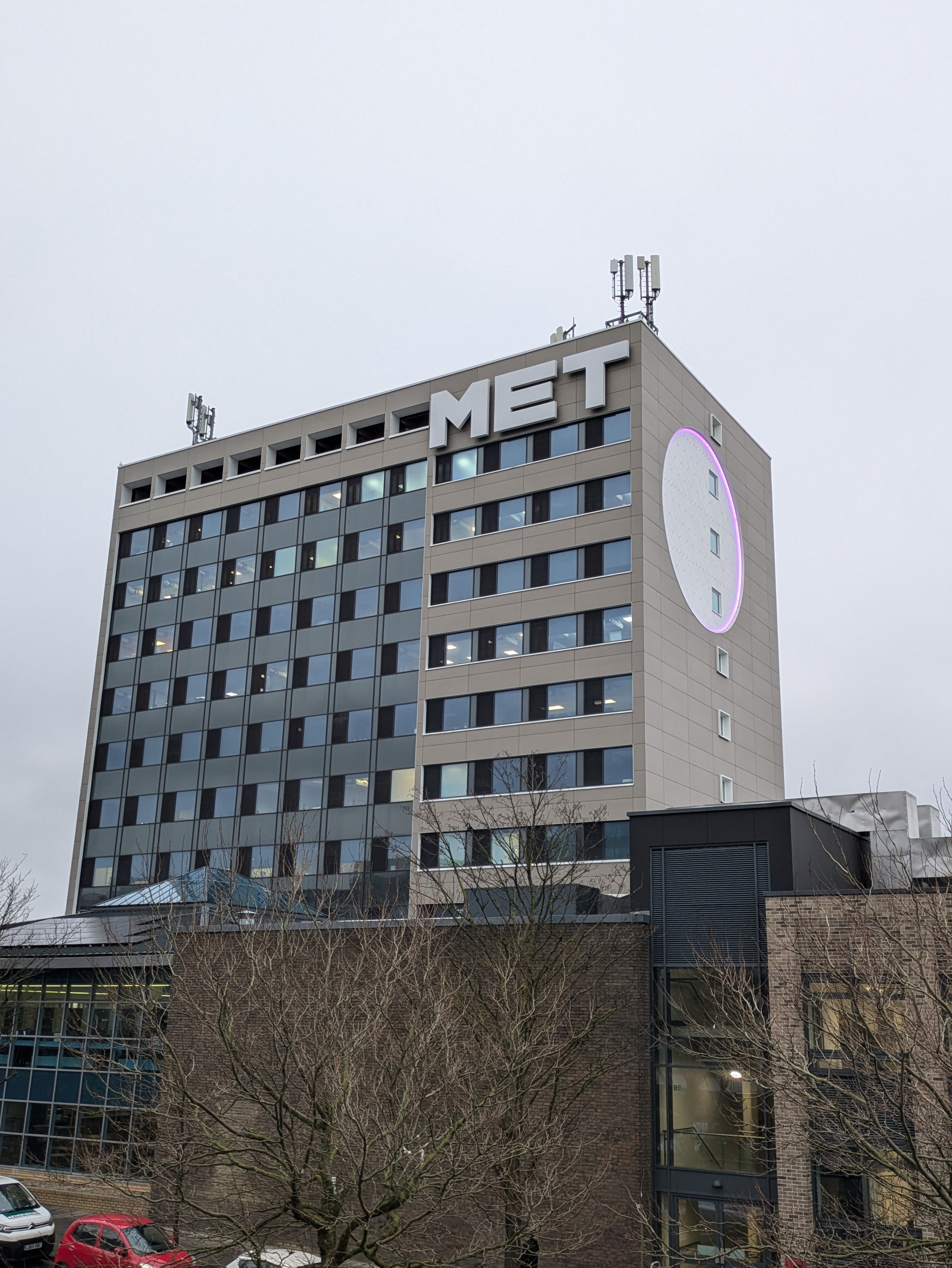
- Pelham Tower, the main building of the Central Brighton Campus

Location
- Central Brighton Campus Pelham Street, Brighton, BN1 4FA; 50.8292°N 0.1371°W

Information
- Other name: Brighton Metropolitan College
- Former name: City College Brighton & Hove, Brighton College of Technology, Brighton Technical College, Brighton School of Art & Science
- Type: Further Education College
- Established: 1858
- Gender: Coeducational
- Age: 16+
- Enrolment: c. 6,000 students
- Campuses: Central Brighton Campus, East Brighton Campus
- Affiliation: Chichester College Group
- Website: www.brightonmet.ac.uk

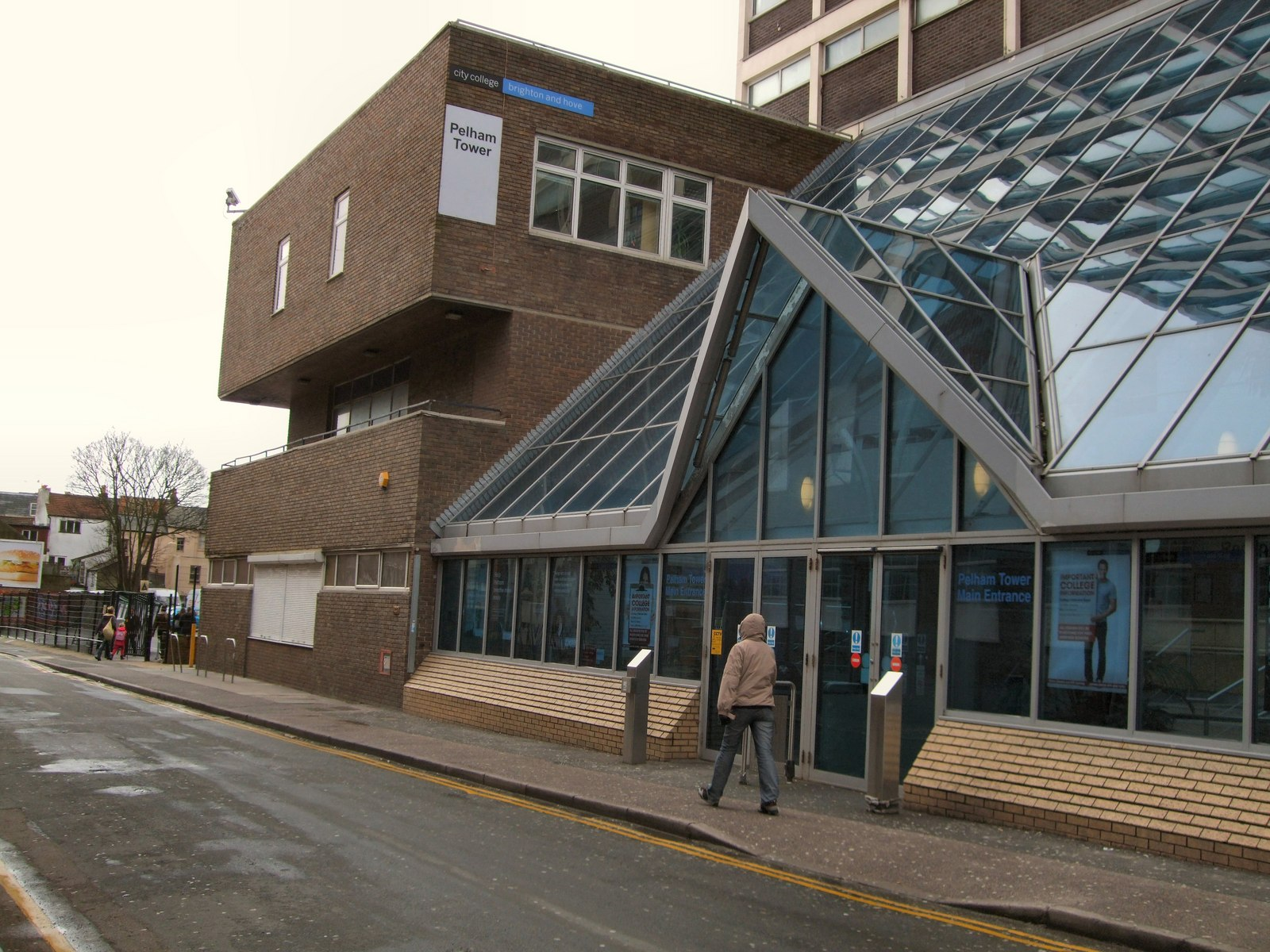
The main entrance of the Central Brighton Campus in 2010, prior to the college's redevelopment.

Brighton MET is a general further education college located in Brighton and Hove. It became part of the Chichester College Group after Greater Brighton Metropolitan College merged with CCG on 1 August 2021. It has two campus: Central Brighton Campus on Pelham Street and East Brighton Campus on Wilson Avenue.

The college is a choice for visual arts progression from nearby colleges e.g. A-level art and photography courses, and provides academic grounding in workmanships such as woodwork, carpentry, engineering, plumbing and electronics. The technical progressions the college provided gave opportunities for post-GCSE students wishing to pursue a specific profession rather than studying multiple A-levels. The college also supported adult learning for over 21s, including those without existing traditional qualifications but the necessary experience and intentions.

== History ==
The college has formerly been known as City College Brighton & Hove, Brighton College of Technology, Brighton Technical College and Brighton College of Arts and Technology.

=== Redevelopment ===
On 11 December 2013 it was announced that plans for the college to be rebuilt were approved by the local planning committees. It was hoped the new building would be more appropriate for teaching, aiding growth in the local area by creating 141 construction jobs. However, the plan was controversial among students, staff and residents. This is partly due to part of the college plot being sold off for housing and many departments being reduced in size.

== Courses ==
The college offers vocational courses, academic and vocational A-levels, BTEC National and First Diplomas and NVQs, and progression to its own Higher Education courses in conjunction with the University of Brighton.

== Awards ==
The college's carpentry department was awarded a City & Guilds Medal for Excellence eleven times from 1996. The college also achieved the ‘Action for Business Colleges’ (AfBC) accreditation, marking the college's responsiveness to the needs of the local business community.

In addition the college was also awarded a 'Centre of Vocational Excellence' (CoVE) status in Digital Design, Instrumentation, Automation and Control Engineering, Heritage Engineering, Business, Management and Finance, Hospitality and Tourism.

== Alumni ==
Famous alumni of the college include:

- Julie Christie, actress
- Navnit Dholakia, Baron Dholakia, Liberal Democrat politician
- Bob Goody, actor and writer
- Isa Ibrahim, Bruneian lawyer and politician
- Graham Kerr, chef ("The Galloping Gourmet")
- Deborah Meaden, businesswoman on Dragons' Den
- Steve Ovett, track athlete, Olympic gold medalist
- Dame Flora Robson, actress
- Arumugam Vijiaratnam, engineer and Olympic athlete

== See also ==
- List of UCAS institutions
- List of universities in the United Kingdom
