= Oak Grove College =

Coordinates: 50.8273°N 0.4100°W

Location
- The Boulevard; Worthing, West Sussex, BN13 1JX; England

Information
- Type: Community special school
- Local authority: West Sussex
- Department for Education URN: 126161 Tables
- Ofsted: Reports
- Headteacher: Phillip Potter
- Gender: Coeducational
- Age: 11 to 19
- Website: oakgrovecollege.org.uk

Oak Grove College is a coeducational special school and sixth form in Worthing, Sussex, England, maintained by West Sussex County Council. The school provides special education for students with learning difficulties from Year 7 to Year 14. In late 2016 the school was awarded foundation level of the British Council's International School Award in recognition of its work to bring the world into the classroom. From 1971 to 2005, the school was named Highdown School and was at Durrington Lane, Durrington, Worthing.

== History ==
=== Early days ===
The school was originally Durrington Junior Training Centre, and was at Durrington Lane, Durrington, Worthing. In 1971, administration of the training centre was transferred from West Sussex County Council, where it had come under the health committee, to Worthing Borough Council; it was renamed Highdown School.

=== Highdown School ===
In 1973, Highdown School had 96 pupils, who were described as mentally handicapped, and a unit where the student-teacher ratio was one-to-one. The same year, nursery children from the Fitzalan Howard Children's Centre in Worthing, run by Worthing, Littlehampton and district Spastics Society, were moved to a new unit at Highdown School. In 1975, the school had 111 pupils aged from two and a half to sixteen, and 16 teachers. In 1977, there was a waiting list for the school. In 1997, it had 107 children on roll. It was an all-through school.

==== Facilities ====
In 1974, the school had a swimming pool, riding lessons and camping holidays for its pupils. The school was proud of the work it did to design equipment to suit children's needs, and of its flat for teaching home economics. In 1976, it opened a caravan for pupils to stay in at Lodge Hill, Ditchling. In 1996, children in its nursery class could access portage, an educational service provided through home visits. In 1999, the school opened a service for children and young people aged 16-19, to help them to learn independence skills. By 2003, the school had a unit for children with autism.

==== Residential and foster care ====
In the 1970s and 1980s, the school had a hostel for thirty children, with a housemother. By 1986, this was known as Highdown Hostel, and also provided respite care. By 1988, it had been renamed Cissbury Lodge. By 2002, when the school on the Durrington Lane site was closed, not all children at Cissbury Lodge were attending Highdown School.

In 1984, some of the children attending the school were in foster care.

==== Notable connected people ====
In the 1960s and 1970s, Lavinia Fitzalan-Howard, Duchess of Norfolk took an interest in the school and visited frequently.

In 1999, Liam Neeson gave the school £5,000 and a signed poster of the film Star Wars: Episode I – The Phantom Menace; he had a family member attending the school and had been impressed by it.

== Plan for closure, protests and school move ==
In 2002, the county council announced that Highdown School would close in 2004 and be replaced by a secondary school for children with special educational needs (SEN). This was part of a series of changes to schools for children with SEN locally, and meant that children with severe learning difficulties at Highdown would be educated with children with moderate learning difficulties attending Palantine School, Worthing, and Herons Dale School, Shoreham. Parents had concerns about the changes, and were described as angry and upset. In May 2003, the council announced that Highdown would move to the Durrington High School site in 2005, and change its pupils' age range from 3-19 to 11-19. The West Sussex Gazette described this as the result of "a successful campaign by parents to keep it open". In April 2004, councillors rejected the building plans for the new Highdown School on the Durrington High site. In May 2004, revised plans were approved. Building work started in July 2004. Whilst the school was being built, two men working on the site died falling from a crane.

== Oak Grove College ==
The new school opened in 2005, and was renamed Oak Grove College. The headteacher, Phillip Potter, said in 2018 that the school was poorly funded and was in deficit by £240,000; there had been no increase in child-level funding over the previous seven years. In 2019 he again criticised funding, and a lack of integrated services for children. In 2020, he criticised the lack of guidance for special schools relating to the COVID-19 pandemic in the United Kingdom.

== Ofsted ==
Oak Grove "continues to be a good school" following a 2024 Ofsted inspection. In 1997, as Highdown School, Ofsted judged it effective.
