= National Diploma (United Kingdom) =

Academic qualification in the United Kingdom

A National Diploma is a standard academic qualification, offered by most further education colleges and universities in the United Kingdom. It is part of the National qualifications frameworks in the United Kingdom.

In England, Wales and Northern Ireland, National Diplomas are offered at Level 3 (secondary education), while the Higher National Diploma is offered at Level 5 (higher education); a Higher National Certificate is offered at Level 4.

Scottish institutions offer a Higher National Diploma at Scottish Level 8.

National Diplomas can be used as an alternative to A-levels; students will study one subject for two years, instead of studying 2 or 3 A-level subjects. One National Diploma is normally equivalent to 2 A-levels while a BTEC Extended Diploma is equivalent to 3 A-levels.

National Diplomas can be used to apply to university.

National Diplomas scores are given as Pass, Merit and Distinction; a Distinction* grade may be given to excellent work.

The title National Diploma is used in a variety of ways. Most National Diplomas are further education qualifications rated at level 3 on the National Qualifications Framework, but some are at levels 4 and 5 (higher education). The Higher National Diploma is rated at level 5 on the Framework for Higher Education Qualifications in England, Wales and Northern Ireland. Some professional National Diplomas are rated at level 6, but these are usually awarded by an independent body, recognising specialist study in a particular field.

The most common National Diplomas in the UK are those awarded by BTEC. BTEC National Diplomas are awarded in numerous subjects, standardised programmes of study which are offered by colleges and universities nationwide. Many colleges, universities and externally examining bodies will also offer their own independently devised National Diploma courses.
