= Durrington High School =

Academy in West Sussex, England

Location
- The Boulevard; Worthing, West Sussex, BN13 1JX; England; 50.827°N 0.40°W

Information
- Type: Academy
- Established: 1973
- Department for Education URN: 140713 Tables
- Ofsted: Reports
- Chair of Governors: Dawn Kearney
- Headteacher: Shaun Allison and Chris Woodcock
- Gender: Mixed
- Age: 11 to 16
- Enrolment: 1607
- Houses: Malala (Yellow), Turing (Red), Attenborough (White), Seacole (Green), Angelou (Purple), Pele (Blue), Year 7 (Pink)
- Website: durringtonhighschool.co.uk

Durrington High School is a coeducational secondary school located in Worthing, West Sussex. The school operated as a high school between 1973 and 2015 as part of Worthing's three-tier provision. From September 2015 the school became a standard secondary for 11 – 16-year-olds. The school converted to academy status on 1 April 2014.

== History ==
This senior school is the product of a merger in 1973 of two neighbouring schools, with their playing fields divided by a single white line: Worthing County Secondary School for Girls (Rodmell Road site) and Worthing Technical High School (Boulevard site).

The County Secondary School for Girls moved to the new brick-built Rodmell Road building in 1953 from the Sussex Road school with Miss Lilian Belchamber continuing as the head mistress until the creation of Durrington High School in 1973.

The Technical High moved to the Boulevard location in 1955 from Union Place Worthing and was renamed Worthing Technical High School (strictly speaking, it was renamed 'The Technical High School, Worthing' as it was a West Sussex institution rather than a Worthing one, and had a catchment area covering the whole of the West Sussex coastal area).

The school building has been rebuilt and extended considerably with the Technical High building demolished during the mid-1990s and sections of the Rodmell Road building still standing and extended.

In 2015, education provision in Worthing was reorganised into the standard two-tier provision, with Durrington increasing its roll by extending to take pupils in Year 7 who had previously attended the local middle schools.

== Campus ==
The school shares a campus with Oak Grove College Special School. The building is purpose-built, offering facilities for all subjects, including science labs, technology suites and a music department. There is also a large field in which cricket pitches and goal posts are set up, and a MUGA (Multi Use Games Arena) for 6 a-side leagues etc. An astro turf was built in 2015, the size of a full hockey pitch with two hockey goals and four goal posts, and is rented out.

== Houses ==
All pupils and staff are assigned to one of seven houses, named after modern saints: Acutis, Bakhita, Bernadette, John Paul II, Francis, Romero and Teresa.

== Notable former pupils ==
- Harrison Reed (footballer) - professional football player currently playing for Fulham
