= Worthing Downland Estate =

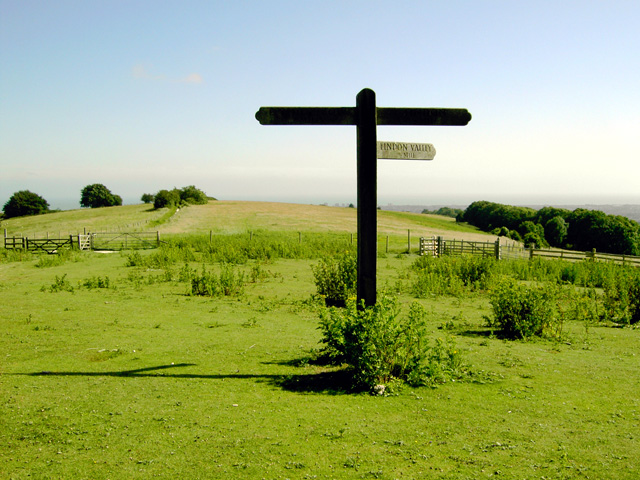
- View across the top of Mount Carvey, with the sea beyond

- Location within England
- Location: West Sussex, England
- Nearest city: Worthing, West Sussex, England
- Coordinates: 50.860141°N 0.37932°W
- Area: 150 acres (61 ha)
- Established: 1930s
- Governing body: Worthing Borough Council, Adur District Council, South Downs National Park Authority, Natural England

The Worthing Downland Estate, Worthing Downs or Worthing Downland, is an area of land in the South Downs National Park in West Sussex, England, close to the town of Worthing. It was bought by the public, following threats to the beauty spot of Cissbury Ring and the surrounding farmland, which led to a public campaign purchases in the 1930s. It is currently owned and managed, on behalf of the public, by Worthing Borough Council.

== Location ==
The land lies in the north of the borough of Worthing in West Sussex. To the north lies Cissbury Ring, which is owned by the National Trust; to the west lies the Worthing suburb of Findon Valley and to the south lies Charmandean Lane in the Worthing suburb of Broadwater. Three golf courses lie to the south and were formerly part of the Worthing Downland Estate. Two golf courses are part of Worthing Golf Club and a further course forms part of Hill Barn Golf Club.

== Ancient history ==
Plough disturbed sites at Mount Carvey and High Salvington remain a possible sites of Neolithic flint mines. The downs north of Worthing held the greatest concentration of flint mines in Neolithic Britain.

The remains of a trackway that follows the ridge of Tenants Hill can be seen. It was in use from the early Iron Age to Roman periods (between around 800BC to 409AD). The trackway extends south to Charmandean Lane, which in Broadwater turns into a footpath known as the Quashetts, which becomes Worthing High Street and finally the Steyne before reaching the sea. It is likely that Worthing's Roman grid system of centuriation would have been based on this ancient track. To the north the track extended to Cissbury Ring and from there continued northwards to Chanctonbury Ring and into the Weald. The track would have been used as a droveway for the seasonal movement of livestock or transhumance in the summer months into the forest of the Weald. One of the track's northern destinations would have been 'Little Broadwater', 17 miles (27 km) to the north of Broadwater and about 19 miles (31 km) north of Worthing seafront. This area, which includes the remains of Sedgwick Castle, remained an outlying part of the parish of Broadwater until its amalgamation with the parish of Nuthurst in 1877.

== Modern history ==
=== Purchase in 1930s ===
Throughout the 1920s and 1930s large the Brighton and Eastbourne Corporations bought up large tracts of downland to protect them from development. It was at this period that concern about development also saw the formation of groups such as the Society of Sussex Downsmen (later the South Downs Society and now the Friends of the South Downs ). In the 1930s geographer Vaughan Cornish advocated a national park for the South Downs between the rivers Arun and Adur, believing that the eastern downs would be looked after by Brighton and Eastbourne Councils and the western downs were too wooded to be representative of the South Downs. At Findon Valley, Thakeham Rural District Council has approved considerable building of bungalows and this was seen as threatening the integrity of the Iron Age hillfort of Cissbury Ring. With the help of Worthing residents, the National Trust bought land at Cissbury Ring in 1925 to protect it from development.

Worthing Corporation (the forerunner to present-day Worthing Borough Council) continued this trend around Worthing in the 1930s. Between 1933 and 1939, the Worthing Corporation purchased 1,000 acres (405 ha) acres of open downland north of Worthing, mostly in the parish of Broadwater and at High Salvington. In 1939 the Worthing Corporation purchased 72 acres (29 ha) acres of land at High Salvington. This land adjoined another 59 acres (24 ha) acres that were purchased around the same time. When land at High Salvington had been threatened with development, Worthing resident, the actress Nancy Price, wrote to The Times newspaper which raised money by public subscription which allowed the Worthing Corporation to purchase the land. Nancy Price raised almost £7,000, included donations from Caroline Kipling and Ada Galsworthy, the wives of Sussex-based novelists Rudyard Kipling and John Galsworthy.

At the time of the transaction the Town Clerk of the Worthing Corporation stated, “Most of it is land over which the public is free to roam at will and which will remain undeveloped for ever. It is a tremendous and valuable lung in view of the continuous encroachment of bricks and mortar on all parts of the south coast.”

=== Open access designation in 2000s ===
Following the death of a tenant farmer in 2009, Worthing Borough Council proposed to sell-off the public land. On 14 November 2009 hundreds of people gathered on the downland to the north of Worthing to protest against the proposed sale of the land. Following the protests, the decision was taken on 3 December 2009 to be withdrawn from sale.

On 29 November 2015 Worthing Borough Council dedicated the land at Mount Carvey and Tenants Hill as open access land under the Countryside and Rights of Way Act 2000 to be used in perpetuity for public access and enjoyment. The decision followed a six-year public campaign led a group called the Worthing Downlanders (formerly the Stop the Cissbury Sell Off group). Worthing Council agreed to long-term leases rather than selling freeholds on farm buildings and land.

== Biodiversity ==
The site forms part of the North-east Worthing downs Biodiversity Opportunity Area. Tenants Hill forms part of the Tenants Hill and Reservoirs Site of Nature Conservation Interest (SNCI). Further SNCIs are located adjacent to the Worthing Downland Estate at the Cissbury Ring SNCI and the Worthing and Hill Barn Golf Courses SNCI.

The land is lowland calcareous grassland. Species present include slow-worm (anguis fragilis), tree pipit (anthus trivialis), dusky brocade (apamea remissa), common toad (bufo bufo) and adder (vipera berus).

== Gallery ==
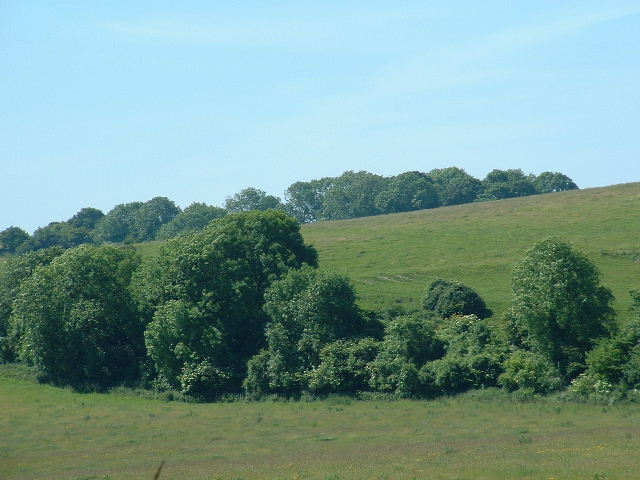
Looking south-west to Tenants Hill

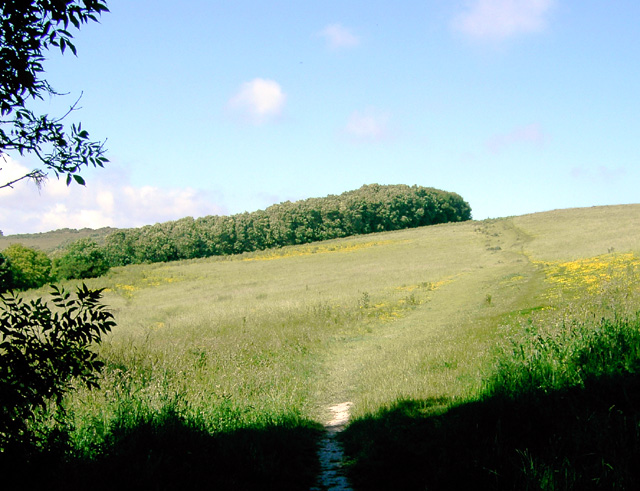
Path ascending Mount Carvey from Findon Valley

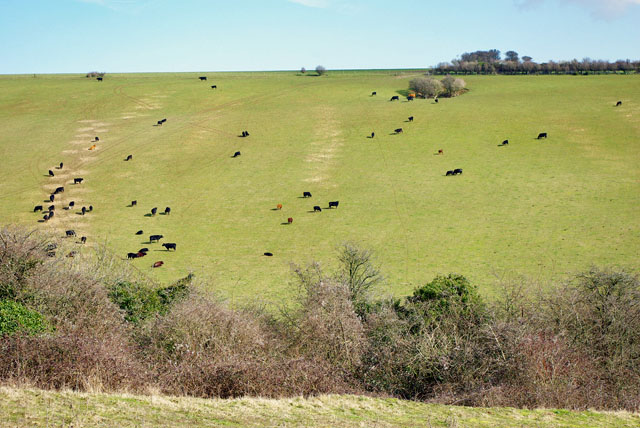
View from Tenants Hill of cattle on west slopes of Lychpole Hill

== See also ==
- Geography of Sussex
- Eastbourne Downland Estate
- Brighton and Lewes Downs Biosphere Reserve
- Titnore Wood
- Highdown Hill

== Bibliography ==
- Brandon, Peter (2010). The Discovery of Sussex. London: Phillimore. ISBN 978-1860776168.
- Kerridge, Ronald; Standing, Michael (2005). Worthing. Teffont: The Francis Frith Collection. ISBN 978-1-85937-995-0.
