= Teville Stream =

Coordinates: 50.817°N 0.376°W

Location
- Country: England
- Counties: West Sussex
- Towns/Cities: Worthing

Physical characteristics
- Source
  - location: West Tarring, Worthing, West Sussex, UK
- Mouth: Brooklands Park
  - location: Worthing, West Sussex, UK
  - elevation: 0 m (0 ft)

Basin features
- Tributaries
  - left: Broadwater Brook or Sompting Brook

The Teville Stream is a stream which flows through the town of Worthing in West Sussex. Once significantly wider than the current stream, it is now culverted for much of its length.

== Watercourse ==
The Teville Stream rises at allotments in Tarring, West Sussex before flowing alongside Tarring Road and Teville Road for much of its length. Passing through Homefield Park and the playing fields of Davison High School, the stream continues into fields near East Worthing railway station, it meets with Broadwater Brook (also known as Sompting Brook) before turning abruptly southwards to Brooklands Lake, from where it flows into the English Channel. The Teville stream forms a shallow valley, so land to the south of the stream rises, reaching a high point along the line of the A259 before falling again to the south, towards the sea.

== History ==
To the west of modern Teville Gate, there is evidence of a broad lagoon in the valley of the Teville stream which existed in the Mesolithic period and was filled through silting from the start of the Neolithic period until around 2000BC. There is evidence that Worthing's Roman grid system, known as 'centuriation', was based on plots and their distance from the Teville stream and the neighbouring inlet of the sea from which Broadwater gets its name. It is possible that in medieval times a harbour was sited at the stream's estuary. Until the 19th century, Worthing was fairly isolated. The Teville Stream was tidal and considerably wider than it is today. The only road into Worthing from Broadwater and the north was much further west along the Teville Stream, it being the first place the stream could be forded. This was modern South Farm Road (formerly known as Brook Street or Port Street as it led to Worthing's port). In 1803 a new turnpike was opened linking Worthing directly with Broadwater to the north. A tollgate to use the new road, known as Teville Gate, was set up near the Teville stream.

The Teville stream flowed through common land (the Teville Common) and there was also a pond on the common which was filled in the 19th century (the Teville Pond). The Teville stream in the east marked the boundary between Broadwater and Worthing, while to the west it formed the boundary between the parishes of Tarring and Heene.

In the 19th century, the Teville stream formed an extensive boundary around the north and east of the town of Worthing. It was supplemented by a wall built to the town's west (close to Heene in modern West Worthing) which allowed movement into the town to be restricted to people deemed respectable. Later, in 1832, the leader of Worthing's last smuggling gang was shot dead at point blank range whilst escaping across a narrow footbridge across the Teville stream.

In 1820, the sea around the mouth of the Teville stream and Broadwater brook (modern-day Brooklands lake) broke through the beach east of Worthing and briefly re-created the former tidal inlets of the Teville stream and Broadwater brook, almost reaching Broadwater village. For some time, Tarring Road was known as Vapours Lane, supposedly because of the vapours and mists which settled near the stream.

The Teville Stream once fed an ornamental lake in Homefield Park.

During the Second World War the culverts of the Teville stream were recut to form a more effective barrier against tanks which might travel along the potentially vulnerable gap through the South Downs at Findon Valley.

In 1958, land around the lower part of the stream was drained to form a park containing a boating lake, to act as a tidal reservoir for surface water from the Teville stream and Broadwater brook.

In the future, it is hoped that new paths can be created that allow part of the Teville stream to be visited. A new link of nature trails have been proposed to run from Brooklands and the present-day mouth of the Teville stream by the sea, right the way up to the Downs. The first stage of this would be a route following the Teville stream from Pages Lane in East Worthing across fields to Brooklands lake.

== Etymology ==
The name Teville is of unknown origin, although according to local historian Robert Elleray, the stream is named after the Tevill or Teevil common which was enclosed by two branches of the stream. Other sources state the Teville Common was named after the stream The Teville Gate shopping centre (which has since been demolished) was named after the Teville Gate tollgate for the turnpike road from Worthing northwards across the stream. The stream was once known as the Selbourne or Selborne, as evidenced by two locations on the stream's route - Selbourne Terrace, which stands on Teville Road, and Selborne Road, in which Davison High School lies. It was also known for a while as Town Mead Ditch, after a common known as Town Mead that lay near the Teville common.

== See also ==
- Worthing
