= Worthing =

Town and borough in West Sussex, England

Worthing Borough of Worthing
- Town and borough
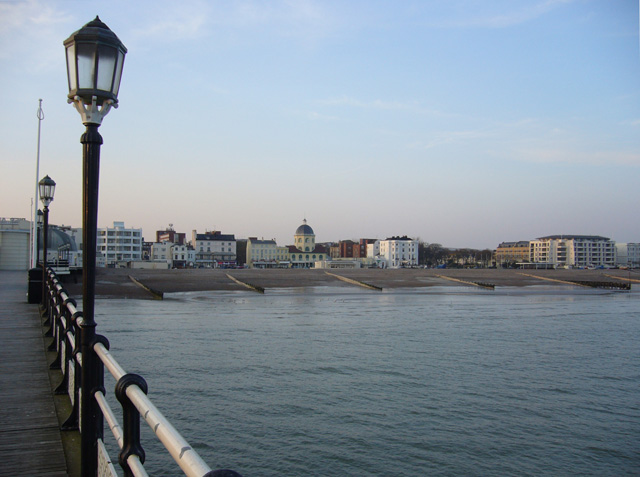
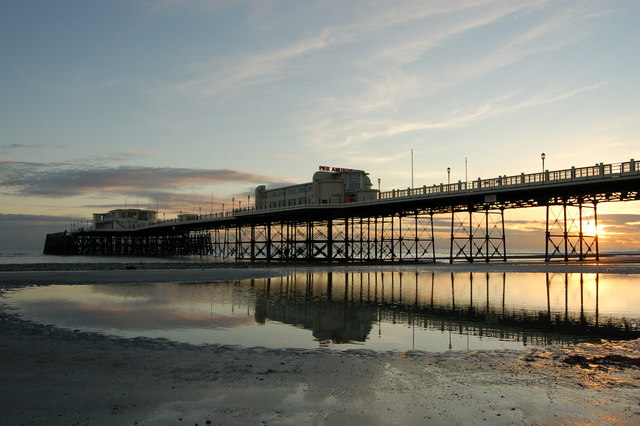
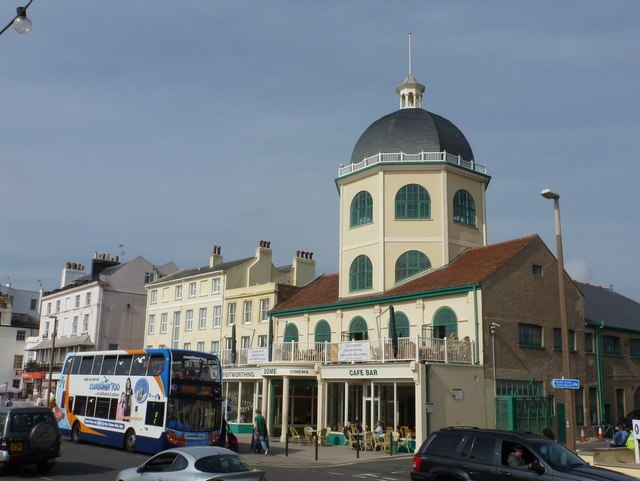
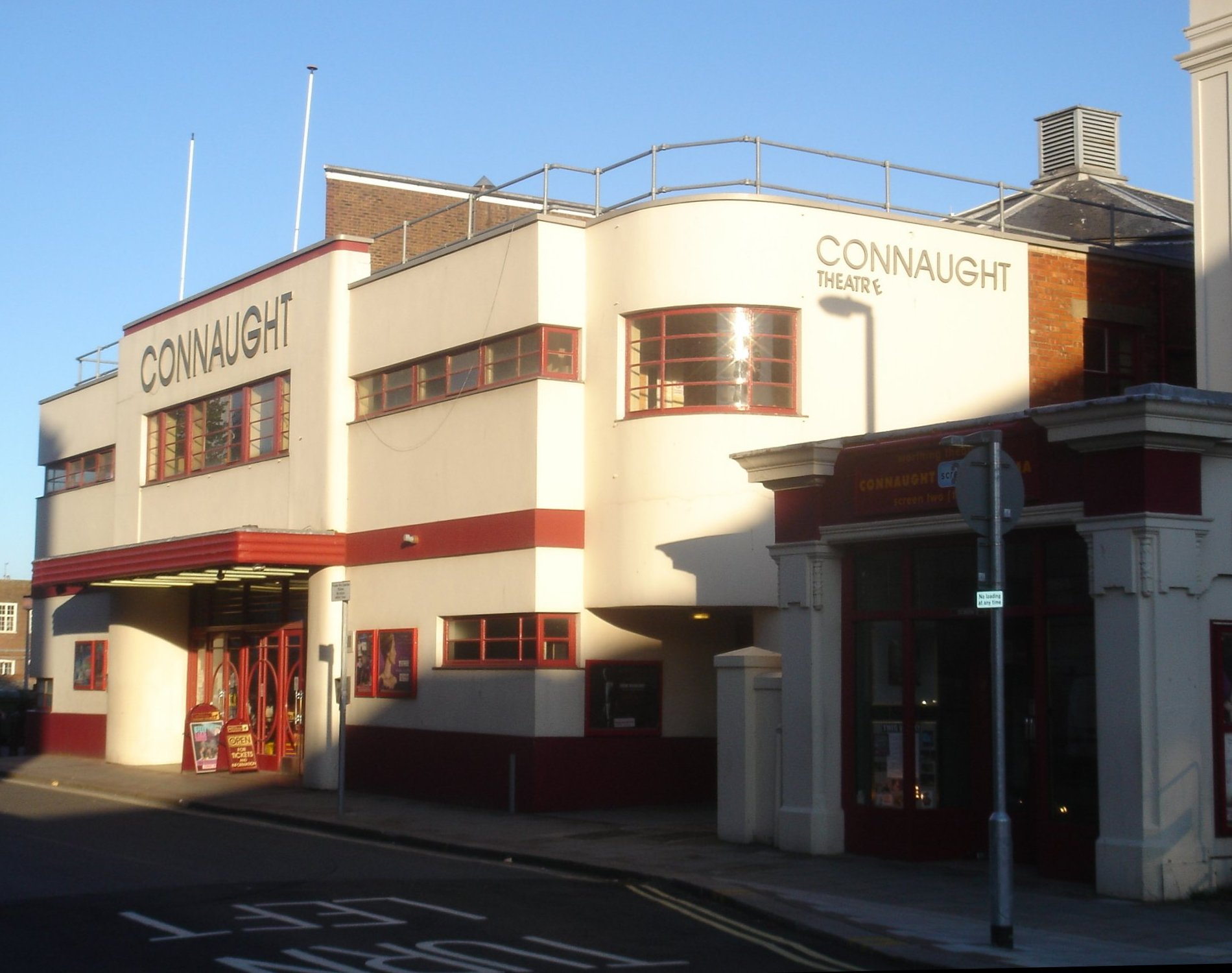
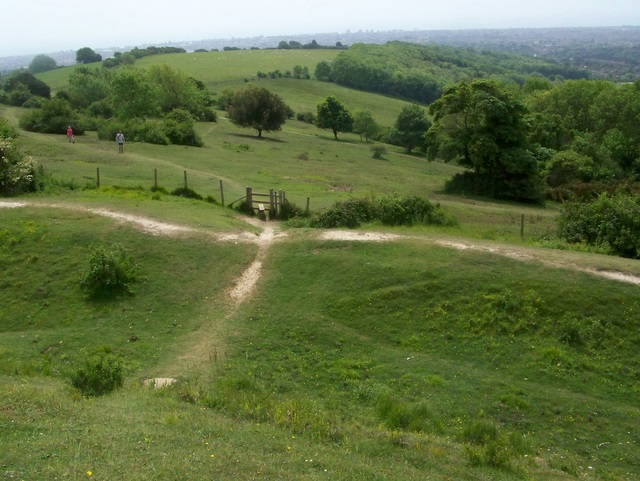
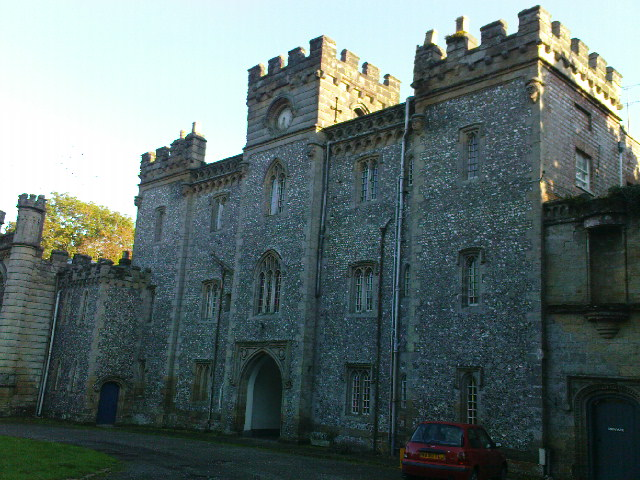
- Clockwise, from top: Worthing seafront from Worthing Pier, Dome Cinema, Castle Goring, Cissbury Ring in the South Downs National Park, Connaught Theatre, Worthing Pier

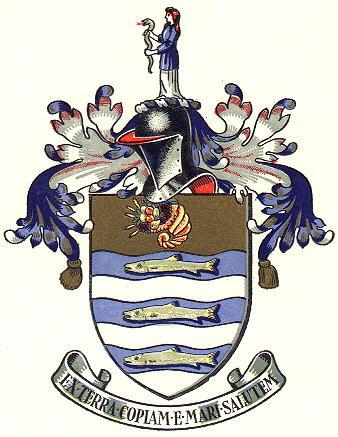
- Coat of Arms of the Borough Council
- Etymology: Old English Wyrtingas
- Nickname: Sunny Worthing
- Motto: "Ex terra copiam e mari salutem" (Latin for "From the land plenty and from the sea health")
- Location within West Sussex

- Location within England Location within the United Kingdom Location within Europe
- Coordinates: 50°48′53″N 0°22′17″W
- Sovereign state: United Kingdom
- Country: England
- Region: South East England
- Historic county: Sussex
- County: West Sussex
- Borough: Worthing
- Founded: In Antiquity
- Town charter: 1803; 223 years ago
- Borough status: 1890; 136 years ago
- Administrative HQ: Worthing Town Hall

Government
  - Type: Borough
  - Body: Worthing Borough Council
  - Leadership: Leader and cabinet
  - Executive: Labour
  - Leader of Council: Cllr Sophie Cox (Lab)
  - Chief Executive: Catherine Howe
  - MPs: Beccy Cooper (Lab); Tom Rutland (Lab)

Area
  - Borough: 12.54 sq mi (32.48 km^{2})
  - Rank: 277th
- Elevation: 23 ft (7 m)
- Highest elevation: 604 ft (184 m)

Population (2025)
  - Borough: 113,844 (ranked 217th)
  - Density: 9,070/sq mi (3,501/km^{2})
  - Urban: 474,485
- Demonym: Worthingite

Ethnicity (2021)
  - Ethnic groups: List: 91.4% White; 3.9% Asian; 2.6% Mixed; 1.2% Black; 1% other

Religion (2021)
  - Religion: List: 45.7% no religion; 43.9% Christianity; 6.3% not stated; 1.7% Islam; 0.7% other; 0.7% Hinduism; 0.6% Buddhism; 0.2% Judaism; 0.1% Sikhism
- Time zone: GMT
  - Summer (DST): British Summer Time
- Postcode: BN11–BN14
- Area code: 01903
- ONS code: 45UH
- Highest point: Cissbury Ring (184m)
- Grid reference: TQ147190
- Website: adur-worthing.gov.uk

Worthing (/ˈwɜːrðɪŋ/ WUR-dhing) is a seaside town and borough in West Sussex, England, at the foot of the South Downs, 11 miles (18 km) west of Brighton, and 18 miles (29 km) east of Chichester. With a population of 113,094 and an area of 12.5 square miles (32.4 km^{2}), the borough is the second largest component of the Brighton and Hove built-up area, the 15th most populous urban area in the United Kingdom. Northern parts of the borough, including the Worthing Downland Estate, form part of the South Downs National Park. In 2019, the Art Deco Worthing Pier was dubbed the best in Britain.

Dating from around 4000 BC, the flint mines at Cissbury and nearby Church Hill, Blackpatch and Harrow Hill are amongst the earliest Neolithic monuments in Britain. The Iron Age hill fort of Cissbury Ring is one of Britain's largest. The recorded history of Worthing began with the Domesday Book. Worthing is historically part of Sussex, mostly in the rape of Bramber; Goring, which forms part of the rape of Arundel, was incorporated in 1929. Worthing was a small mackerel fishing hamlet for many centuries until, in the late 18th century, it developed into an elegant Georgian seaside resort and attracted the well-known and wealthy of the day. In the 19th and 20th centuries, the area was one of Britain's chief market gardening centres.

Modern Worthing has a large service industry, particularly in financial services. It has three theatres and one of Britain's oldest cinemas, the Dome. Writers Oscar Wilde and Harold Pinter lived and worked in the town.

== Etymology ==
The earliest known appearance of the name of Worthing is Wyrtingas, from circa AD 960. It was listed as Ordinges or Wordinges in the Domesday Book of 1086, and was subsequently known as Wuroininege, Wurdingg, Wording or Wurthing, Worthinges, Wyrthyng, Worthen and Weorðingas. The modern name Worthing was first documented in AD 1297.

The etymology of the root Worth- is uncertain. Wyrt is the Old English word for "plant," "vegetable," "herb" or "spice," though there is no obvious connection with the name of the town. Additionally, the "y" was a front-loaded vowel that was indistinguishable from "i" by the end of the Anglo-Saxon period and the spelling never evolved in that direction. The more obvious Middle English worth is not likely as well, as there was a dramatic Norman language influence on the spelling at the time of the Domesday Book. A more probable root is the word for an Anglo-Saxon goddess - Wyrd, known in Norse mythology as Urðr - with a shift of the alveolar consonant d to t as evidenced by the eleventh century evolution of the word.

The suffix -ing is a cognate of inge, an ethnonym for the Germanic Ingaevones peoples, said variously to mean "of Yngvi" - of Freyr in Norse mythology, "family, people or followers of" or a genitive plural form of an inhabitant appellation.

== History ==
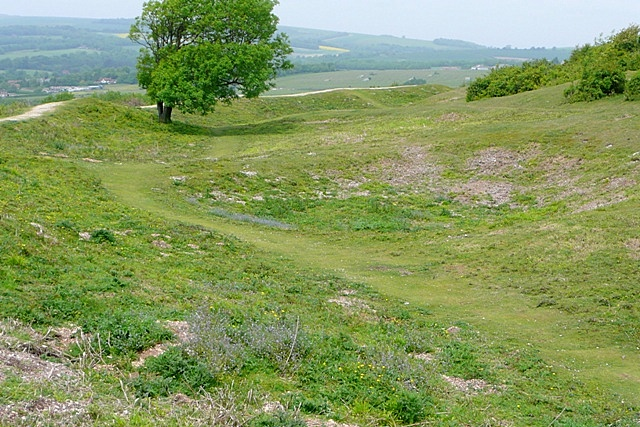
The backfilled remains of a flint mine shaft, one of about 270 mine shafts at Cissbury. From around 4000 BC, the South Downs above Worthing was Britain's earliest and largest flint-mining area.

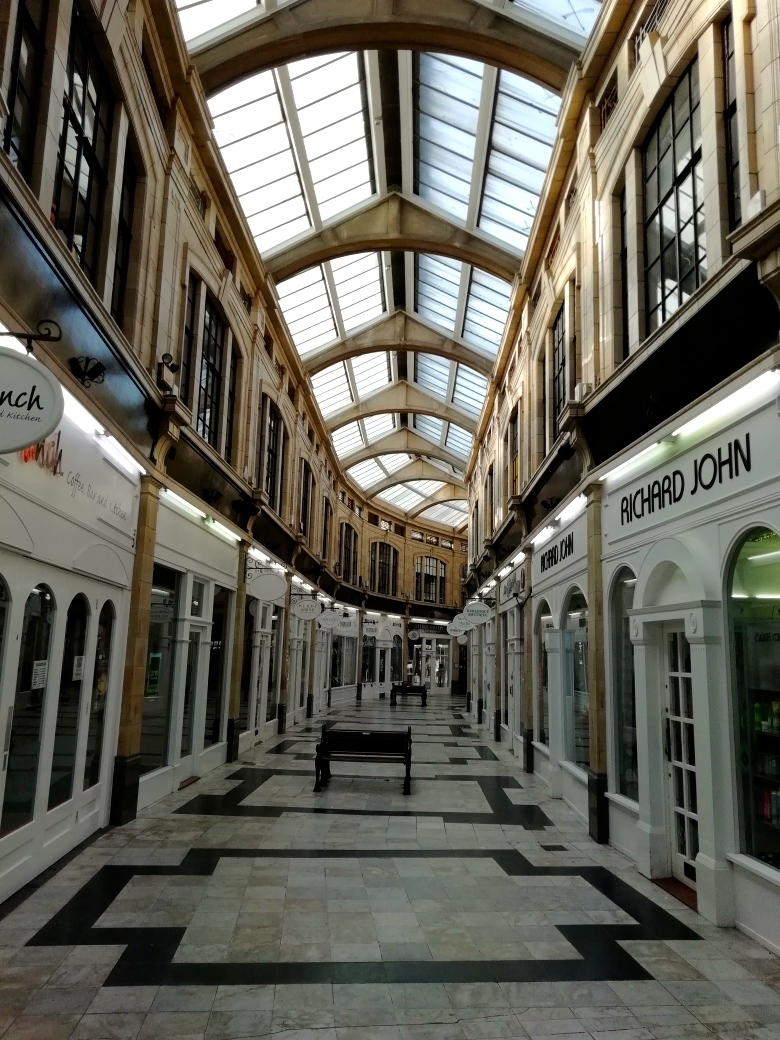
The marbled Edwardian architecture of The Royal Arcade, Worthing

From around 4000 BC, the South Downs above Worthing was Britain's earliest and largest flint-mining area, with four of the UK's 14 known flint mines lying within 7 miles (11 km) of the centre of Worthing. The flint mine at Cissbury, the highest point in the borough of Worthing, had around 270 mine shafts, some up to 12 metres (39 ft) deep, dug using tools made from the bone and antlers of red deer. More than an industrial complex, the site probably had sacred and ritualistic meaning to Neolithic people perhaps due to its stark white colour and its association with the Earth's surface and the entrance to the underworld. Graffiti or art scratched into the chalk at Cissbury and nearby Harrow Hill may be the earliest dateable examples of Neolithic art in Britain. An excavation at Little High Street dates the earliest remains from Worthing town centre to the Bronze Age. There is also an important Bronze Age hill fort on the western fringes of the modern borough at Highdown Hill.

During the Iron Age, one of Britain's largest hill forts was built at Cissbury Ring. The area was part of the civitas of the Regni during the Romano-British period. Several of the borough's roads date from this era and lie in a grid layout known as centuriation. A Romano-British farmstead once stood in the centre of the town, at a site close to Worthing Town Hall. In the 5th and 6th centuries, the area became part of the Kingdom of Sussex. The place names of the area, including the name Worthing itself, date from this period.

Worthing remained an agricultural and fishing hamlet for centuries until the arrival of wealthy visitors in the 1750s. Princess Amelia stayed in the town in 1798 and the fashionable and wealthy continued to stay in Worthing, which became a town in 1803. The town expanded and elegant developments such as Park Crescent and Liverpool Terrace were begun. The area was a stronghold of smugglers in the 19th century and was the site of rioting by the Skeleton Army in the 1880s.

Oscar Wilde holidayed in the town in 1893 and 1894, writing the Importance of Being Earnest during his second visit. The town was home to several literary figures in the 20th century, including Nobel Prize-winner Harold Pinter. On 9 October 1934 violent confrontations took place in the town between protestors and Oswald Mosley's British Union of Fascists which subsequently became known as the Battle of South Street. During the Second World War, Worthing was home to several allied military divisions in preparation for the D-Day landings, in particular many Canadian divisions.

Worthing became the world's 229th Transition Town in October 2009. The project explored the town's transition to life after oil, and was established by local residents as a way of planning the town's Energy Descent Action Plan.

== Governance ==
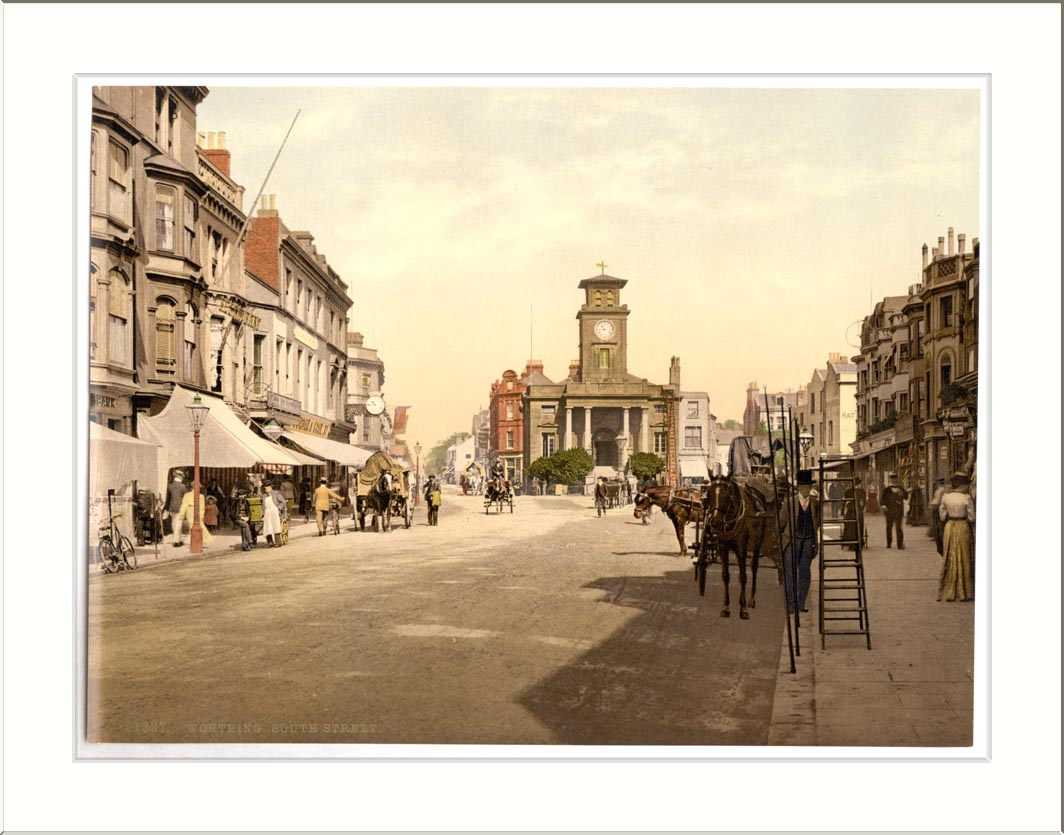
Photochrom print of South Street in the 1890s, showing the Old Town Hall

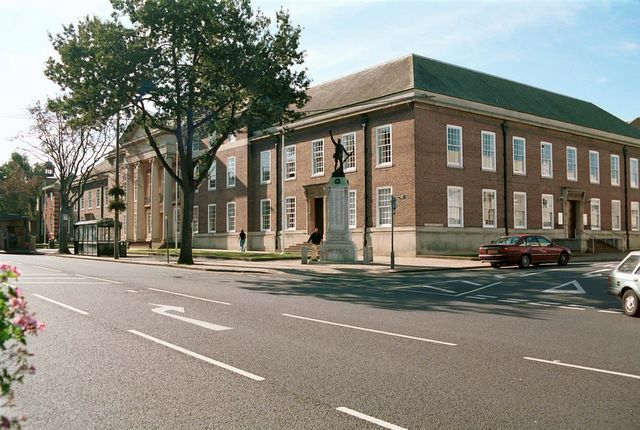
Built in 1933, Worthing Town Hall replaced the town's original Georgian town hall as the headquarters of Worthing Borough Council

Local government for the borough of Worthing is shared between Worthing Borough Council and West Sussex County Council in a two-tier structure. Worthing Borough Council partners with neighbouring local authorities, as part of Adur and Worthing Councils and the Greater Brighton City Region. The borough is divided into 13 wards, with 11 returning three councillors and two returning two councillors to form a total council of 37 members. The borough is unparished. At the 2022 election the Labour Party won control of the council for the first time, ending 18 years of Conservative administration.

The town currently returns nine councillors from nine single-member electoral divisions to West Sussex County Council out of a total of 70. At the 2021 West Sussex County Council election, Worthing returned five Labour and four Conservative councillors. The council is responsible for services including school education, social care and highways. The county council has been controlled by the Conservative Party since 1974, with the exception of the period 1993—97 when the council was under no overall control.

Since 2014, Worthing has also been within the area of the Greater Brighton City Region. The borough is represented on the City Region's Economic Board by the leader of the borough council.

The town has two Members of Parliament (MPs): Beccy Cooper (Labour) for Worthing West and Tom Rutland (Labour) for East Worthing and Shoreham.

At the 2017 general election, the East Worthing and Shoreham seat became a marginal seat for the first time, with both seats having been held by their incumbents since the seats' creation before the 1997 general election. From 1945 to 1997 Worthing returned one MP. From 1945 until 2024 Worthing had always returned Conservative MPs. Until 1945 Worthing formed part of the Horsham and Worthing parliamentary constituency.

== Geography ==
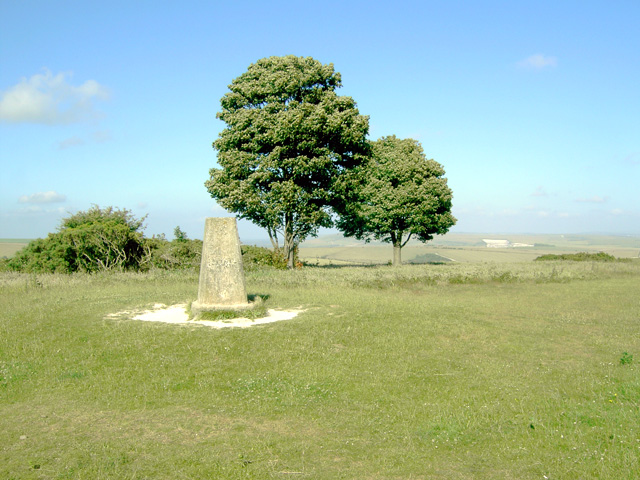
At 184 metres (604 ft) above sea level, the summit of Cissbury Ring is the highest point in Worthing.

Worthing is situated in West Sussex in South East England, 49 miles (79 km) south of London and 10 miles (16 km) west of Brighton and Hove. Historically within Sussex, in the rape of Bramber, Worthing is built on the South Coast Plain facing the English Channel. To the north of the urban area are the chalk hills of the South Downs, which form a National Park. The suburbs of High Salvington and Findon Valley climb the lower slopes of the Downs, reaching up to the 120-metre (394 ft) contour line, whereas the highest point in the borough reaches 184 metres (604 ft) at Cissbury Ring. Land at Cissbury Ring and the adjacent publicly owned Worthing Downland Estate together form a 145-hectare (360-acre) area of open access land within the borough. Further high points are at West Hill (139m) north-west of High Salvington and at Highdown Hill (81m) on the boundary with Ferring. Cissbury Ring forms the only Site of Special Scientific Interest in the borough.

With a population of about 200,000, (Note: The combined population in 2011 of the Worthing urban subdivision (109,120), the Littlehampton subdivision (55,706), Sompting (8,561) and Lancing (18,810) was 192,197) the Centre for Cities identifies the wider primary urban area of Worthing as one of the 63 largest cities and towns in the UK. Extending from Littlehampton to Lancing, the primary urban area is roughly equivalent to the present day borough and the area administered from 1933 to 1974 as the Worthing Rural District, or the 01903 Worthing telephone code area. Worthing forms the second-largest part of the Brighton and Hove built-up area, England's 12th largest conurbation, with a population in 2011 of over 470,000. The borough of Worthing is bordered by the West Sussex local authority districts of Arun in the north and west, and Adur in the east.

Worthing is situated on a mix of two beds of sedimentary rock. The large part of the town, including the town centre, is built upon chalk (part of the Chalk Group), with a bed of London clay found in a band heading west from Lancing through Broadwater and Durrington.

Worthing lies roughly midway between the Rivers Arun and Adur. The culverted Teville Stream and the partially-culverted Ferring Rife run through the town. One of the Ferring Rife's sources is in Titnore Wood, a Site of Nature Conservation Interest and one of the last remaining blocks of ancient woodland on the coastal plain.

The development along the coastal strip is interrupted by strategic gaps at the borough boundaries in the east and west, referred to as the Goring Gap and the Sompting Gap. Each gap falling largely outside the borough boundaries. The borough of Worthing contains no nature reserves: the nearest is Widewater Lagoon in Lancing.

=== Marine environment ===
Lying some 3 miles (5 km) off the coast of Worthing, the Worthing Lumps are a series of underwater chalk cliff faces, up to 3 metres (10 ft) high. The lumps, described as "one of the best chalk reefs in Europe" by the Marine Conservation Society, are home to rare fish such as blennies and the lesser spotted dogfish. The site has been declared a Site of Nature Conservation Importance (SNCI) (a site of county importance) by West Sussex County Council. Since 2013 the area has also formed part of the Kingmere Marine Conservation Zone. Just south of the shoreline lies remains of what was once an extensive kelp forest which until the 1980s stretched from Bognor Regis to Brighton and covered approximately 177 km^{2} (68 sq mi). With only 6 km^{2} (2 sq mi) remaining, the kelp forest is now being supported to recover.

=== Climate ===
Worthing has a temperate oceanic climate: its Köppen climate classification is Cfb. Its mean annual temperature of 10.6 °C (51.1 °F) is similar to that experienced along the Sussex coast, and slightly warmer than nearby areas such as the Sussex Weald. On most summer afternoons a sea breeze, sometimes known as The Worthing Effect by the local watersports community, blows from the south-west, building throughout the morning and peaking generally mid to late afternoon.

Climate data for Brighton City Airport, (Note: Weather station is located 4.0 miles (6.4 km) from the Worthing city centre.) (1991–2020 normals, extremes 1998–present)
Month	Jan	Feb	Mar	Apr	May	Jun	Jul	Aug	Sep	Oct	Nov	Dec	Year
Record high °C (°F)	14.4 (57.9)	16.5 (61.7)	19.6 (67.3)	24.2 (75.6)	26.5 (79.7)	29.5 (85.1)	33.4 (92.1)	33.2 (91.8)	29.4 (84.9)	23.0 (73.4)	17.8 (64.0)	14.1 (57.4)	33.4 (92.1)
Mean daily maximum °C (°F)	8.2 (46.8)	8.4 (47.1)	10.5 (50.9)	13.1 (55.6)	16.3 (61.3)	19.1 (66.4)	20.9 (69.6)	21.0 (69.8)	18.9 (66.0)	15.5 (59.9)	11.6 (52.9)	8.9 (48.0)	14.4 (57.9)
Daily mean °C (°F)	5.3 (41.5)	5.4 (41.7)	7.1 (44.8)	9.2 (48.6)	12.2 (54.0)	15.1 (59.2)	17.0 (62.6)	17.1 (62.8)	14.9 (58.8)	12.0 (53.6)	8.4 (47.1)	5.9 (42.6)	10.8 (51.4)
Mean daily minimum °C (°F)	2.4 (36.3)	2.3 (36.1)	3.6 (38.5)	5.2 (41.4)	8.1 (46.6)	11.0 (51.8)	13.0 (55.4)	13.1 (55.6)	10.9 (51.6)	8.4 (47.1)	5.2 (41.4)	2.8 (37.0)	7.2 (45.0)
Record low °C (°F)	−7.4 (18.7)	−2.8 (27.0)	−6.7 (19.9)	−4.2 (24.4)	−0.5 (31.1)	3.2 (37.8)	6.5 (43.7)	5.0 (41.0)	2.1 (35.8)	−3.2 (26.2)	−4.1 (24.6)	−10.3 (13.5)	−10.3 (13.5)
Average precipitation mm (inches)	80.5 (3.17)	56.7 (2.23)	45.7 (1.80)	45.1 (1.78)	45.9 (1.81)	46.7 (1.84)	54.2 (2.13)	58.7 (2.31)	59.1 (2.33)	82.2 (3.24)	90.4 (3.56)	87.5 (3.44)	752.6 (29.63)
Average precipitation days (≥ 1.0 mm)	12.7	10.3	9.0	9.1	8.3	7.7	7.6	8.5	8.2	11.6	13.1	12.6	118.8
Source 1: Met Office
Source 2: Starlings Roost Weather

=== Districts ===
The naming of parts of the town reflect its growth in its formative years of the 19th century. Central parts of the town are made up of the former townships of Worthing and West Worthing, which merged in 1890 when the town gained borough status. This area comprises the town centre, East Worthing and West Worthing. To the north and west of this area are the former villages of Worthing which have old roots but only became urbanised in the 20th century. These districts sometimes share their names – although not necessarily boundaries – with local electoral wards and include the former parishes of Broadwater, Durrington, Goring and (West) Tarring, as well as Findon Valley, which was formerly part of the parish of Findon. Other areas within these parishes include High Salvington, Offington and Salvington.

== Demography ==
=== Population change ===
According to the Office for National Statistics, Worthing's population increased to an estimated 110,570 in 2019. Worthing is the second most densely populated local authority area in East and West Sussex, with a population density in 2011 of 33.83 people per hectare. Worthing underwent dramatic population growth both in the early 19th century as the hamlet had newly become a town and again in the 1880s. The town experienced further growth in the 1930s, and again when new estates were built, using prisoner of war labour, to the west of the town from 1948. The main driver of population growth in Worthing during the 1990s and first decade of the 21st century has been in-migration into Worthing; in particular Worthing is the most popular destination for people moving from the nearby city of Brighton and Hove, with significant numbers also moving to the borough from London.

Historic and projected population growth in Worthing since 1801
Year	Population	Year	Population
1801	2,151	1921	37,906
1811	3,824	1931	45,905
1821	4,922	1939	55,584
1831	5,654	1951	67,305
1841	6,856	1961	77,155
1851	7,615	1971	88,467
1861	9,744	1981	90,686
1871	11,873	1991	98,066
1881	14,002	2001	97,540
1891	19,177	2011	104,640
1901	24,479	2021	111,400
1911	0	2031	117,713

Source: A Vision of Britain Through Time, Office for National Statistics ONS population projections 2022 base

In 2021, 4.02% of residents, rising to 7.08% in central Worthing identified as a sexual orientation other than heterosexual, compared with an average in England and Wales of 3.2%. The figure for under-35s in the borough of Worthing rose to 7.9% compared with an England and Wales average of 6.2%.

=== Ethnicity ===
According to the UK Government's 2021 census, 91.2% of the population was White (85.1% White British, 0.8% White Irish, 0.1% Gypsy/Irish Traveller, 0.2% Roma, 5.2% Other White), 2.5% of mixed ancestry (0.9% White and Black Caribbean, 0.5% White and Black African, 0.9% White and Asian, 0.7% Other Mixed), 4.0% Asian (1.0% Indian, 0.2% Pakistani, 0.7% Bangladeshi, 0.5% Chinese, 1.5% Other Asian), 1.2% Black (0.8% African, 0.2% Caribbean, 0.1% Other Black), 0.2% Arab and 0.8% of other ethnic heritage.

The town also has some notable communities from overseas. At the 2021 census 0.79% (864 people) were born in Poland, 0.70% of its population (778 people) were born in India, 0.68% (753 people) were born in the Philippines and 0.65% (724 people) were born in Romania.

=== Age ===
Worthing has a younger population than the other three districts of coastal West Sussex, albeit older than the South East average. In 2006, 26.7% of the population were between 25 and 44 years old, which is a higher proportion compared to the other districts in the coastal West Sussex area. Over the last 20 years, Worthing has seen the sharpest decline in its population aged 65 years or more with its proportion of the total population falling by 8.1% (7,000 in real terms), at a time when this age group has actually grown across the South East region and elsewhere. In contrast there have been comparatively significant increases in older families (4.5%) and family makers (4.3%) within the borough. In 2010 the estimated median age of the population of Worthing was 42.8 years, 3.2 years older than the average for the UK of 39.6 years.

=== Religion ===
Religion	2001		2011		2021	
Religion	Number	%	Number	%	Number	%
Holds religious beliefs	72,477	74.2	64,326	61.4	53,428	47.9
Christian	70,387	72.1	60,817	58.1	48,897	43.9
Buddhist	330	0.3	600	0.6	704	0.6
Hindu	214	0.2	546	0.5	739	0.7
Jewish	256	0.3	227	0.2	274	0.2
Islam	733	0.8	1,348	1.3	1,912	1.7
Sikh	106	0.1	122	0.1	124	0.1
Other religion	451	0.5	666	0.6	778	0.7
No religion	16,575	17.0	31,577	30.2	50,895	45.7
Religion not stated	8,516	8.7	8,737	8.3	7,013	6.3
Total population	97,568	100.0	104,640	100.0	111,336	100.0

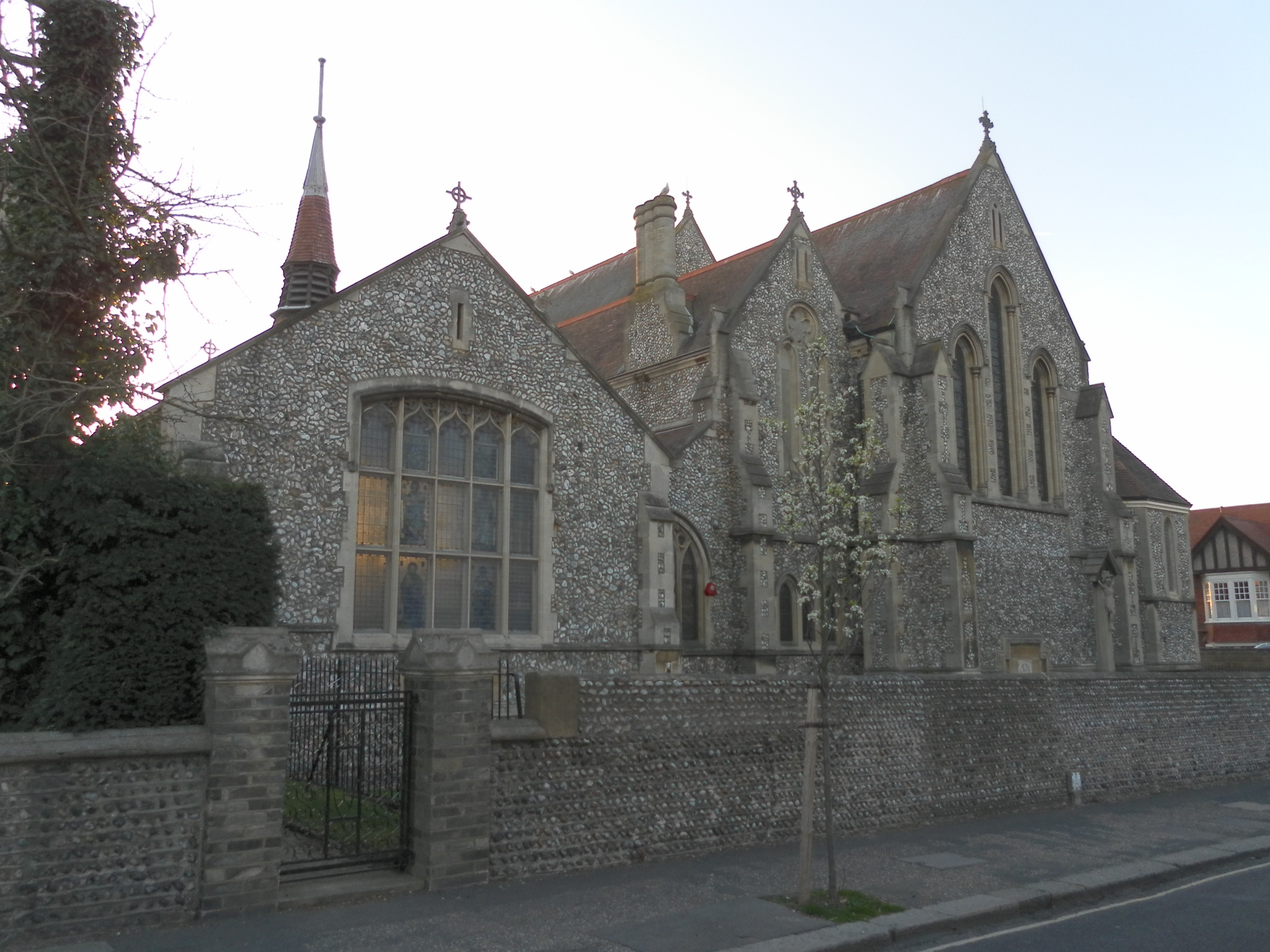
The Church of St Andrew the Apostle (Church of England)

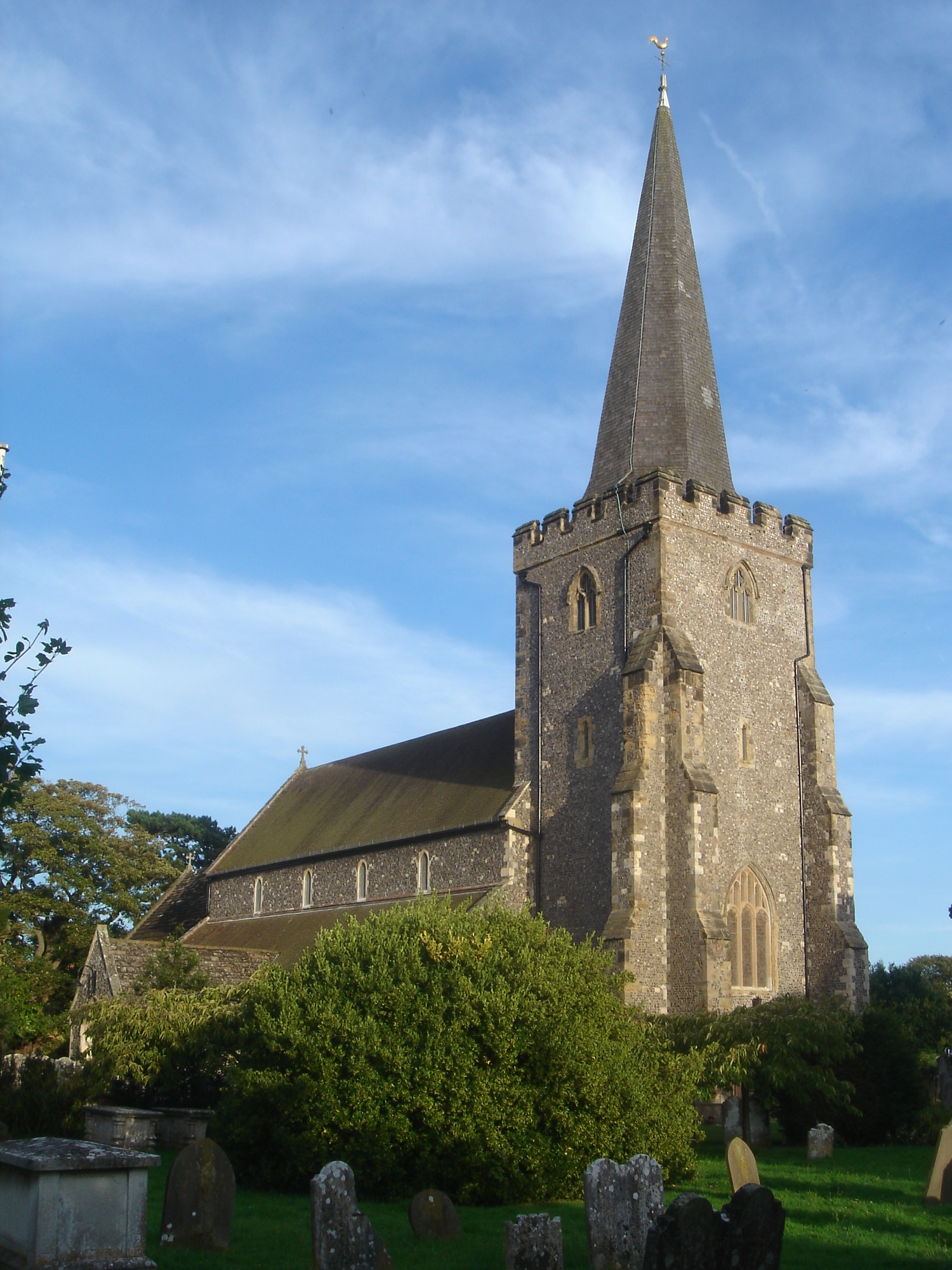
St Andrew's is the parish church of West Tarring.

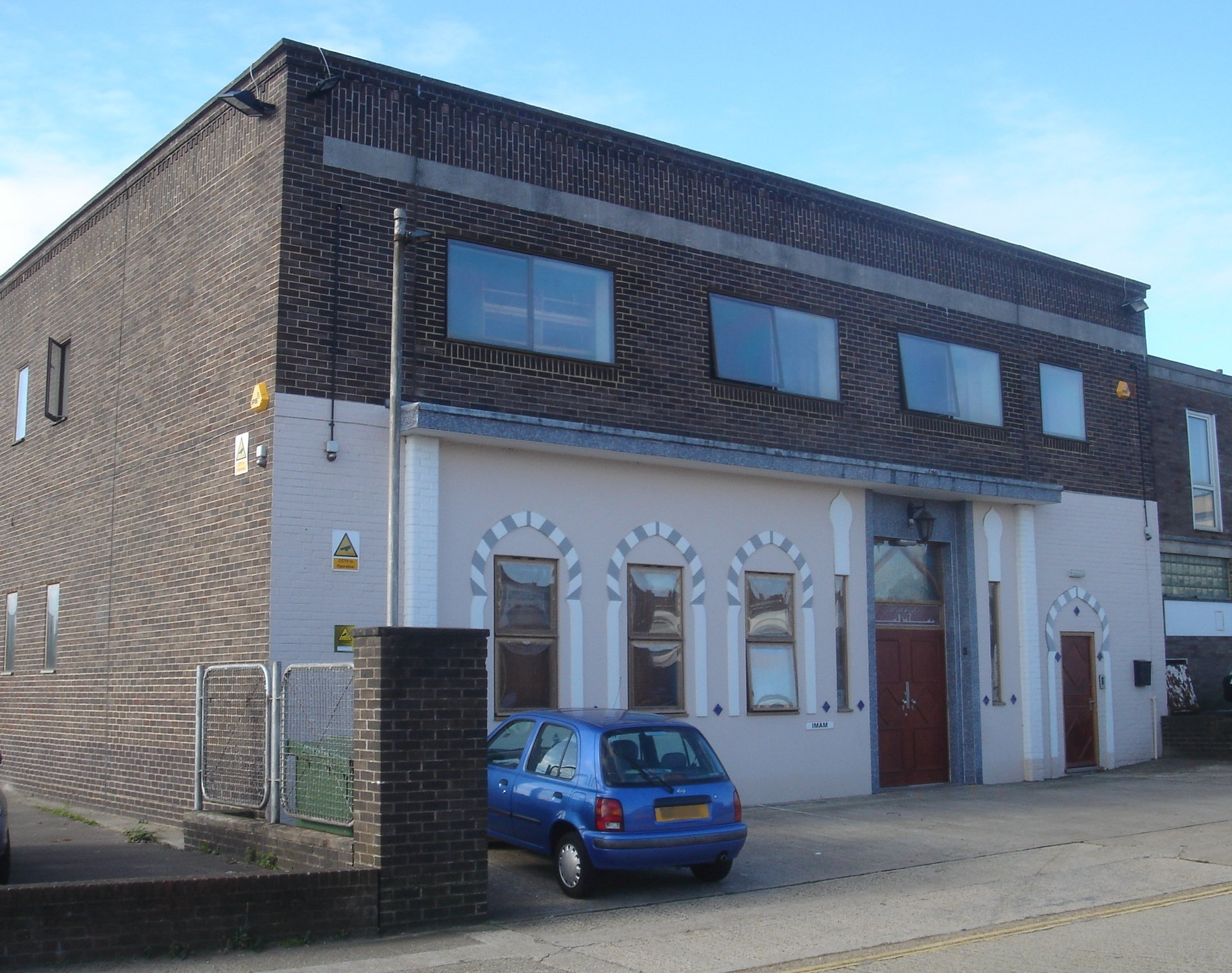
The Masjid Assalam mosque serves the town's Sunni Muslim population.

More people in Worthing identify as Christian than any other religion (43.9% in 2021) and the borough has about 50 active Christian places of worship. Worthing's Churches Together organisation encourages ecumenical work and links between the town's churches.

Worthing's first Anglican church, St Paul's, was built in 1812; previously, worshippers had to travel to the ancient parish church of Broadwater. Residential growth in the 19th century led to several other Anglican churches opening in the town centre: Christ Church was started in 1840 and survived a closure threat in 2006; Arthur Blomfield's St Andrew's Church brought the controversial "High Church" form of worship to the town in the 1880s—its "Worthing Madonna" icon was particularly contentious; and Holy Trinity church opened at the same time but with less dispute.

Other Anglican churches were built in the 20th century to serve new residential areas such as High Salvington and Maybridge; and the ancient villages which were absorbed into Worthing Borough between 1890 and 1929 each had their own church: Broadwater's had Saxon origins, St Mary's at Goring-by-Sea was Norman (although it was rebuilt in 1837), St Andrew's at West Tarring was 13th century, and St Botolph's at Heene and St Symphorian's at Durrington were rebuilt from medieval ruins. All of the borough's churches are in the Rural Deanery of Worthing and the Diocese of Chichester.

The first Roman Catholic church in Worthing opened in 1864; the centrally located St Mary of the Angels Church has since been joined by others at East Worthing, Goring-by-Sea and High Salvington. All are in Worthing Deanery in the Roman Catholic Diocese of Arundel and Brighton. Protestant Nonconformism has a long history in Worthing: the town's first place of worship was an Independent chapel. Methodists, Baptists, the United Reformed Church and Evangelical Christian groups each have several churches in the borough, and other denominations represented include Christadelphians, Christian Scientists, Jehovah's Witnesses, Mormons and Plymouth Brethren. A Coptic Orthodox church is also present in the town. The Salvation Army have been established for more than a century, but their arrival in Worthing prompted large-scale riots involving a group called the Skeleton Army. These continued intermittently for several years in the 1880s. Other Christian organisations include Worthing Churches Homeless Projects and Street Pastors.

In 2021, 1.7% of the population of Worthing were Muslim. Since 1994 the Muslim community has had a mosque at the Worthing Islamic Cultural Centre, also known as Worthing Masjid (Worthing Mosque) or Masjid Assalam (Mosque of Peace, or Mosque of Allah) which follows the Sunni tradition and holds prayer, education, and funeral services for the local community.

There are also small communities of Buddhists (0.6% in 2021) in Worthing, including a community of Triratna Buddhists. There is a small Jewish community (0.2% in 2021) and the town had a synagogue in the 1930s. In 2011, 0.7% of the population were Hindu, 0.1% were Sikh and 0.7% followed another religion. A small community of the Baháʼí Faith practises in Worthing. 45.7% claimed no religious affiliation, a figure significantly higher than the average for England and Wales of 37.2%, and 6.3% did not state their religion.

== Education ==
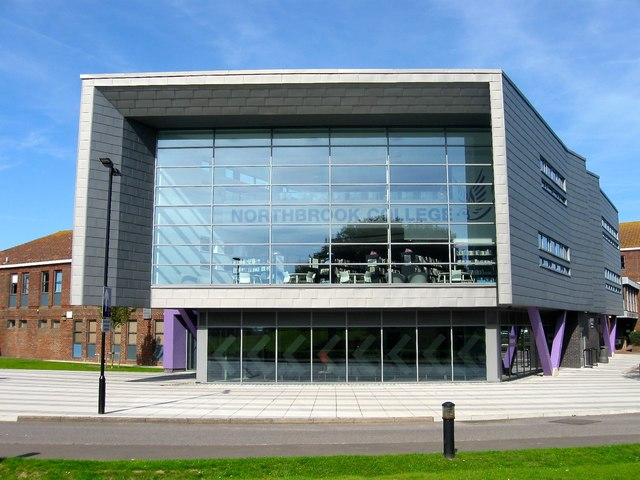
The Learning Resource Centre at Northbrook College's main campus in West Durrington

Worthing has 22 primary schools, six secondary schools, one primary and secondary special school, two independent schools, one sixth form college and one college of higher and further education.

Founded by 1890 as the Worthing School of Art and Science, Northbrook College's main campus is located on the outskirts of Worthing at West Durrington, where its creative arts degrees are validated by the University of the Arts London. Northbrook's Broadwater campus is set to close in 2025 and courses are to be consolidated at West Durrington and at the Broadwater campus of the town's sixth form college, Worthing College. Northbrook and Worthing Colleges share a principal and are both part of the Chichester College Group.

West Sussex County Council provides six state secondary schools: Bohunt School Worthing in Broadwater is a coeducational academy school, Durrington High School and St Andrews High School and Worthing High School are all coeducational, with St Andrew's taking in girls from 2021. Davison High School in East Worthing is a girls' school. St Oscar Romero Catholic School in Goring is a Catholic School. Our Lady of Sion School in the town centre is a private school for children aged 3–18.

== Economy and regeneration ==
Labour profile
Total employee jobs	43,800	—N/a
Full-time	28,000	63.9%
Part-time	15,800	36.1%
Manufacturing	3,300	7.5%
Construction	1,100	2.4%
Services	38,900	88.7%
Distribution, hotels & restaurants	9,600	22.0%
Transport & communications	1,400	3.3%
Finance, IT, other business activities	9,600	22.0%
Public admin, education & health	16,200	36.9%
Other services	2,000	4.6%
Tourism-related	3,000	7.0%

Worthing's economy is dominated by the service industry, particularly financial services. Major employers include GSK, LEMO electronics, Rayner Lenses, HM Revenue & Customs, the Environment Agency and Southern Water.

In October 2009, GlaxoSmithKline confirmed that 250 employees in Worthing would lose their jobs at the factory, which makes the antibiotics co-amoxiclav (Augmentin) and amoxicillin (Amoxin) and hundreds of other products. As of 2009, there were approximately 43,000 jobs in the borough.

Although Worthing was voted the most profitable town in Britain for three consecutive years at the end of the 1990s, the Annual Survey of Hours and Earnings 2009 found that Worthing residents' mean pre-tax pay is only £452 per week, compared to £487 for West Sussex and £535 for South East England as a whole.

In 2008, Worthing was in the top 10 urban areas in England for jobs in each of three key sectors, thought to have a significant impact on economic performance: creative, high-tech industries and knowledge-intensive business services. The 2012 UK Town and City Index from Santander UK ranked Worthing as the second highest town or city in the UK for connectivity and ranked fifth in the UK overall out of 74 towns and cities.

=== Regeneration ===
In June 2006, Worthing Borough Council agreed a masterplan for the town's regeneration, focused on improving the town centre and seafront. A new £150 million development is proposed for Teville Gate, between Worthing railway station and the A24 at the northern approach to the town centre. It is expected to include two residential towers, a multiplex cinema, hotel and conference and exhibition centre. The developers are expected to apply for planning permission in the summer of 2010. Redevelopment is planned for the Grafton Street car park area; and the town's major undercover shopping centre, the Guildbourne Centre, may be rebuilt entirely and extended to Union Place, covering the site of the town's former police station.

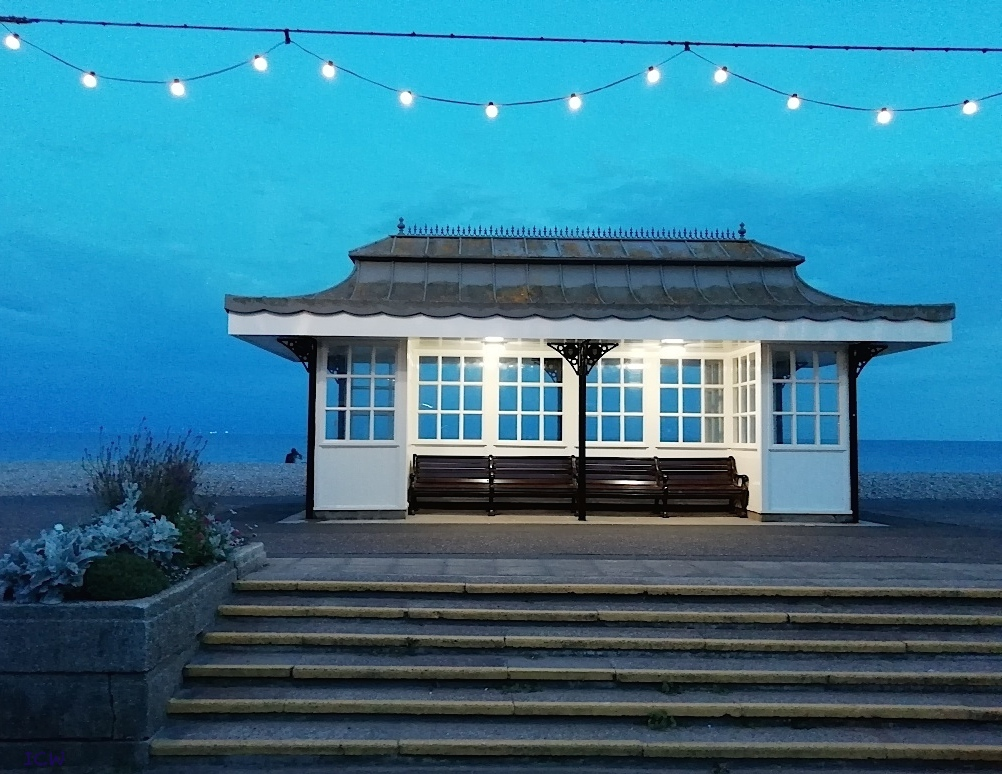
Worthing Victorian promenade shelter at dusk, July 2018

In the longer term, the area around Worthing's museum, art gallery, library and town hall—collectively described as the "Worthing Cultural and Civic Hub"—is to be revamped to provide extra facilities and new housing. In 2009, Worthing Borough Council applied for a £5 million grant from the Heritage Lottery Fund to redevelop and enlarge the museum. A new £16 million municipal swimming pool, Splash Point Leisure Centre, has been designed by Stirling Prize-winning architects Wilkinson Eyre; it was opened by Paralympian Ellie Simmonds in June 2013. It has been proposed that Montague Place is pedestrianised to improve the link between the town centre and the seafront.

Completed regeneration projects include the reopening of the Dome Cinema in 2007 after major investment from the Heritage Lottery Fund, and a £5.5 million mixed-use development on the site of a former hotel near Teville Gate.

== Transport ==
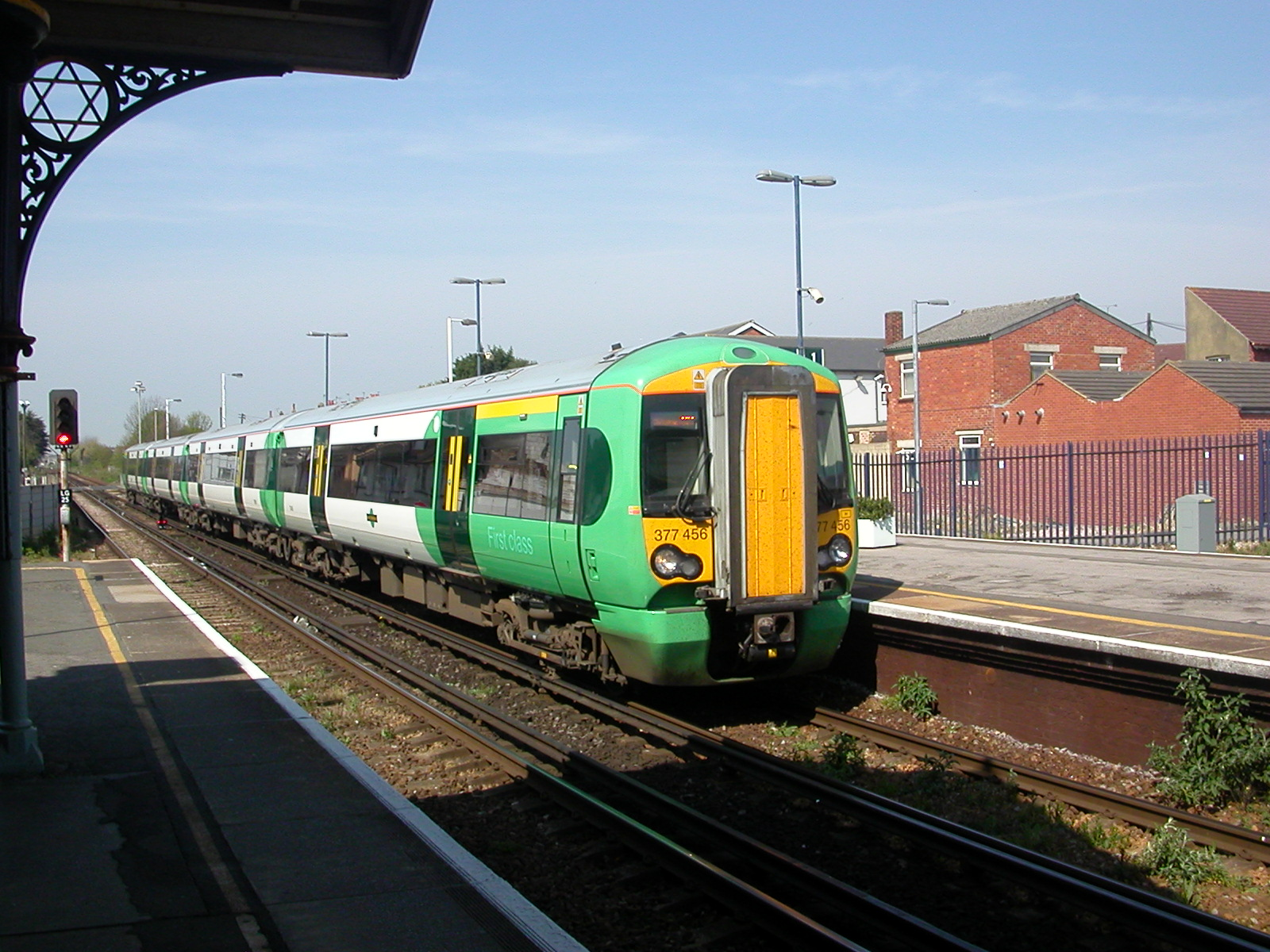
A Southern train arrives at Worthing railway station, 2007

A turnpike was opened in 1803 to connect Worthing with London, and similar toll roads were built later in the 19th century to connect nearby villages. Stagecoach traffic grew rapidly until 1845, when the opening of a railway line from Brighton brought about an immediate decline. The former turnpike is now the A24, a primary route which runs northwards to London via Horsham and connects Worthing with the M25 motorway. Two east–west routes run through the borough: the A27 trunk road runs to Brighton in the east, and to Chichester, Portsmouth, and the M27 motorway in the west. The A259 follows a coastal route between Hampshire and Kent.

Most local and long-distance buses are operated by Stagecoach South. It has its origins in Southdown Motor Services, which was founded in 1915 with one route to Pulborough. Stagecoach in the South Downs operates several routes around the town and to Midhurst, Brighton and Portsmouth. The most frequent service, between Lancing and Durrington, was branded PULSE in 2006. Worthing-based Compass Travel have routes to Angmering, Chichester, Henfield and Lancing; and other companies serve Horsham, Crawley, Brighton and intermediate destinations. National Express coaches run between London's Victoria Coach Station and Marine Parade. During the 1920s and 1930s, a fleet of up to 15 converted Shelvoke & Drewry dustbin lorries—the Worthing Tramocars—operated local bus services alongside more conventional vehicles.

The borough has five railway stations: East Worthing, Worthing, West Worthing, Durrington-on-Sea and Goring-by-Sea. All are on the West Coastway Line and are managed and operated by Govia Thameslink Railway. Worthing opened on 24 November 1845 as a temporary terminus of the line from Brighton, which was extended to Chichester the following year and electrified in the 1930s. Regular services run to destinations such as London, Gatwick Airport, Brighton, Littlehampton and Portsmouth.

Shoreham Airport is about 5 miles (8 km) east of Worthing. The nearest international airport is Gatwick, about 28 miles (45 km) to the northeast.

== Public services ==
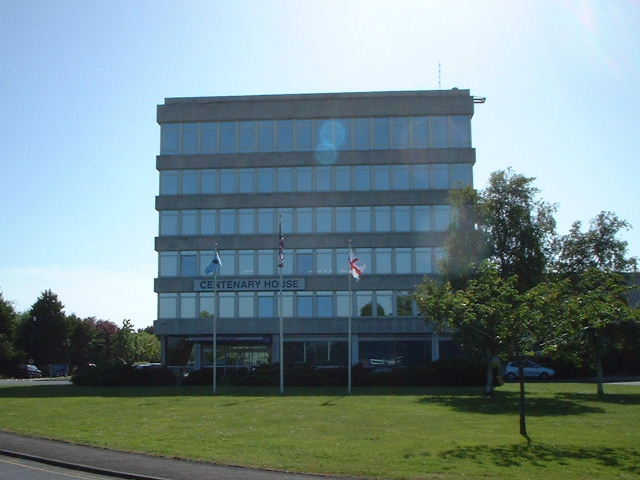
Centenary House is the headquarters of the West Downs division of Sussex Police.

Home Office policing in Worthing is provided by the Worthing district of the West Sussex division of Sussex Police. The district is divided into two neighbourhood policing teams—North and South—for operational purposes. The police station is in Chatsworth Road. The West Downs division's headquarters is at Centenary House in Durrington. Worthing's fire station has been in Broadwater since 1962. The borough had been in charge of fire protection since 1891, after several decades in which volunteers provided the service. A fire station was built on Worthing High Street in 1908; it was demolished after the move to Broadwater. The Worthing and Adur District Team, part of the West Sussex Fire and Rescue Service, employs 60 full-time and 18 retained firefighters.

Worthing Hospital is administered by the University Hospitals Sussex NHS Foundation Trust. The 500-bed facility on Lyndhurst Road was founded in 1881 as an 18-bed infirmary. It replaced older hospitals on Ann Street and Chapel Road. Other medical care facilities include two mental health units (Greenacres and Meadowfield Hospital) and a 38-bed private hospital in the Grade II-listed Goring Hall.

Gas was manufactured in Worthing for nearly 100 years until 1931, but Scotia Gas Networks now supply the town through their Southern Gas Networks division. Electricity generation took place locally between 1901 and 1961; EDF Energy now supply the town. Southern Water, who have been based in Durrington since 1989, have controlled Worthing's water supply, drainage and sewerage since 1974. The town's first waterworks was built in 1852. Drainage and sewage disposal was poorly developed in the 19th century, but a fatal typhoid outbreak in 1893 prompted investment in sewage works and better pipes.

== Voluntary and community groups ==
There are a number of voluntary and community groups active in the town ranging from small volunteer-led groups to large well established charities. There is a Council for Voluntary Service and a Volunteer Centre funded by the local authority to support voluntary action. In 2003-4 registered charities in Worthing indicated a combined income of £56 million in the submitted accounts to the Charity Commission. The Place Survey conducted in all local authority districts by central government in 2009 found that up to 24,000 people in Worthing described themselves as giving volunteer time in the community.

== Culture ==
=== Literature ===
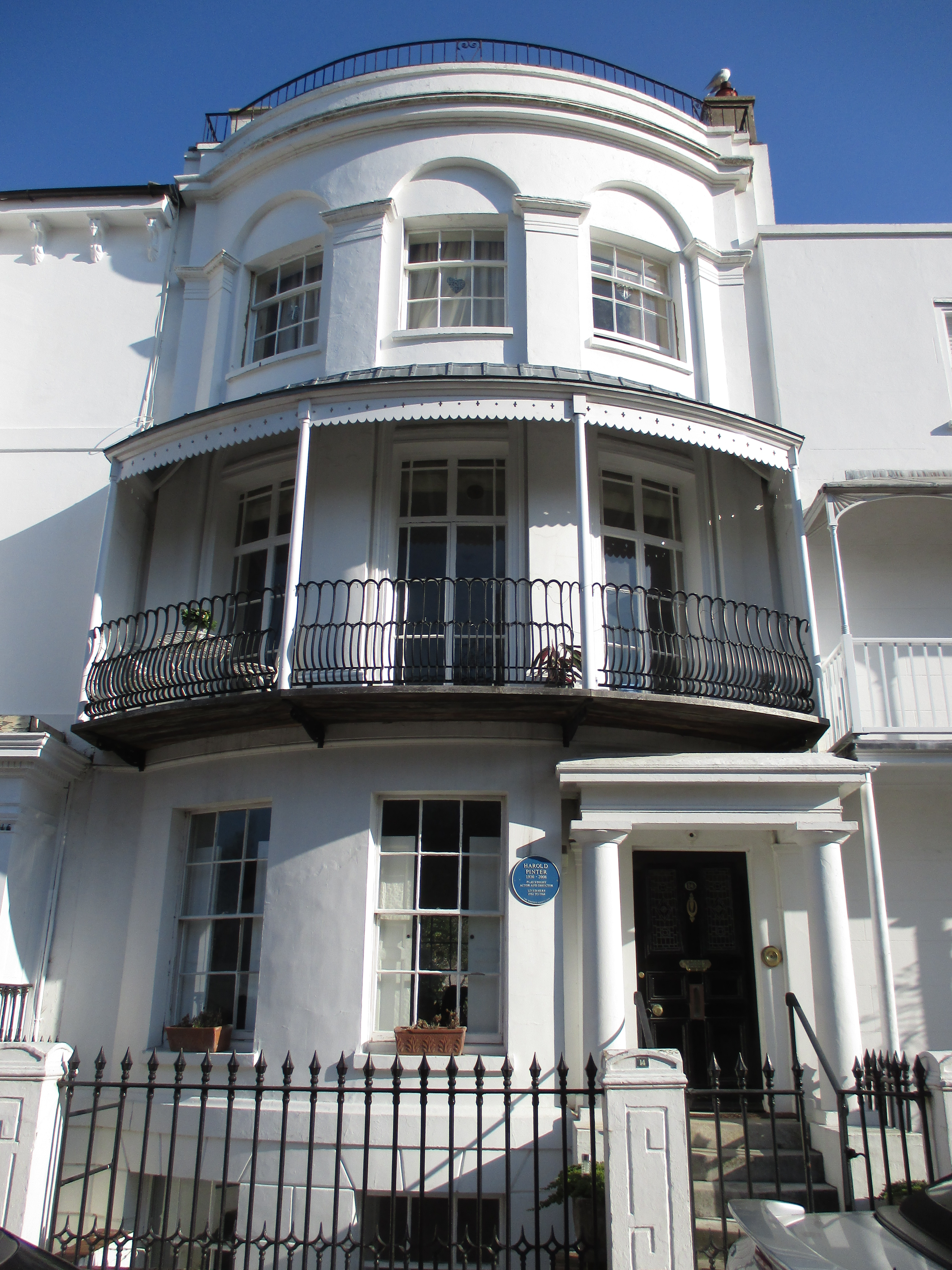
Harold Pinter's former house in Ambrose Place

Salvington in Worthing was the birthplace of philosopher and scholar John Selden in 1584. Jane Austen's unfinished final novel Sanditon is thought to have been significantly based on experiences from her stay in Worthing in 1805. Two of Percy Bysshe Shelley's earliest works were printed in Worthing, including The Necessity of Atheism in 1811, which resulted in Shelley's expulsion from Oxford University and falling out with his father. Shelley's grandfather built Castle Goring and his father was the first chairman of what became Worthing Council. Oscar Wilde wrote The Importance of Being Earnest while staying in the town in the summer of 1894; its main character Jack/Ernest Worthing is named after it. In the 1960s, playwright Harold Pinter lived wrote The Homecoming at his home in Ambrose Place. Other literary figures to have lived in the town include W.E. Henley, W.H. Hudson, Stephen Spender, Dorothy Richardson, Edward Knoblock, Beatrice Hastings, Maureen Duffy, Vivien Alcock, John Oxenham and his daughter Elsie J. Oxenham.

=== Film and television ===
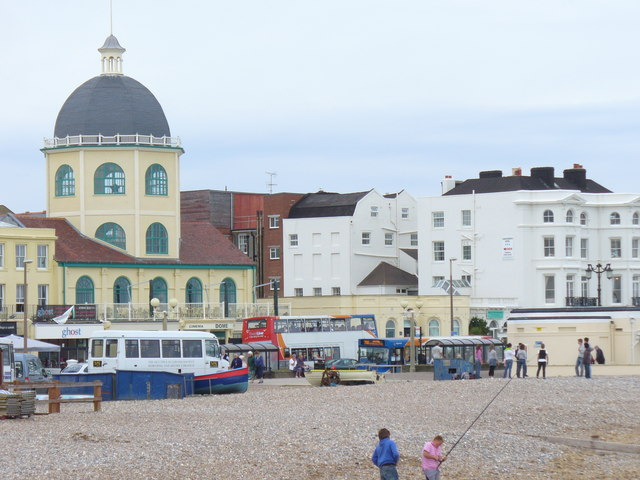
Facing the seafront, the Dome Cinema first opened in 1911 and is one of the UK's oldest working cinemas.

The history of film in Worthing dates back to exhibitions on Worthing Pier in 1896, and two years later William Kennedy Dickson—inventor of the Kinetoscope, a pioneering motion picture device—visited the town to film daily life. In the early 20th century, several cinemas were established, although most were short-lived. Other former cinemas include the Rivoli (1924–1960), the 2,000-capacity Plaza (1933–1968) and the 1,600-capacity Odeon (1934–1986). The Kursaal was built in 1910 as a combined skating rink and theatre by Swiss impresario Carl Adolf Seebold. It was renamed the Dome in 1915 in response to anti-German sentiment during World War I. Seebold opened the 950-capacity Dome Cinema in place of the skating rink in 1922; it is still open, and is one of Britain's oldest operational cinemas. The Connaught Screen 2 cinema (formerly the Ritz, and before that Connaught Hall) was established in 1995.

Many films and television programmes have been filmed using Worthing as the backdrop including: Pinter's The Birthday Party (1968), directed by William Friedkin (best known for directing The French Connection in 1971 and The Exorcist in 1973), Black Mirror (2023), Dance with a Stranger (1985), Wish You Were Here (1987), Stan & Ollie (2018), My Policeman (2022), Vindication Swim (2024) and Wicked Little Letters (2024) as well as the television drama series Cuffs (2015) and The Death of Bunny Munro (2025).

=== Music ===
Artists from Worthing include Alma Cogan, Royal Blood and The Ordinary Boys. During the 1960s, the Worthing Pier Pavilion and Assembly Hall hosted major rock acts, including The Who, The Kinks, The Hollies, The Zombies, The Byrds and Zoot Money. Local bands supported these acts. The venue was a key stop for touring bands during the 60s boom. Worthing was home in the late 1960s to the Worthing Workshop, a group of artists and musicians who included Leo Sayer, Brian James of The Damned, Billy Idol and Steamhammer, whose guitarist, Martin Quittenton, went on to co-write Rod Stewart's UK number one hits "You Wear It Well" and "Maggie May". For three days in 1970 a field on the outskirts of Worthing was the site of the Phun City music festival, the UK's first large-scale free music festival and organised by two former Worthing residents, UK underground musician and author Mick Farren and Gez Cox. In the late 1980s and early 1990s Sterns Nightclub was a major centre for rave culture in the UK and Worthing continues to have a notable electronic music scene.

Music venues include the Assembly Hall, the Pavilion Theatre, The Venue, the Factory Live, Jungle and the Cellar Arts Club. The Assembly Hall is home to the Worthing Symphony Orchestra, the Worthing Philharmonic Orchestra and the Sussex International Piano Competition. Howarth of London, the UK's largest manufacturer of professional standard oboes are based in Worthing.

=== Theatre ===
As of 2019 Worthing has three council-owned theatres: the Art Deco Connaught Theatre (formerly called Picturdrome), the Baroque Pavilion Theatre and the Modernist, Grade II-listed Assembly Hall, which is mostly used for musical performances (including since 1950 an annual music festival). Theatre has been performed in Worthing since 1796. Thomas Trotter, the early promoter and manager at the town's temporary venues, was asked to open a permanent theatre in 1807; his Theatre Royal opened on 7 July of that year and operated until 1855. The building survived until 1870. The 1,000-capacity New Theatre Royal in Bath Place, run by Carl Adolf Seebold for several years, lasted from 1897 until 1929.

=== Museums and galleries ===
Worthing Museum and Art Gallery hosts one of the most significant costume collections in the UK. Built in 1908 as the town's museum and library, it is expected to undergo a major redevelopment in 2020. Alfred Cortis, the first mayor of Worthing, and the international philanthropist Andrew Carnegie funded the construction.

In the visual arts, painter Copley Fielding lived at 5 Park Crescent in the mid-18th century. and more recently Jamie Hewlett and Alan Martin created cult comic figure Tank Girl while at college in the town in the 1980s. The town has a famous work by sculptor Elisabeth Frink. Uniquely in England, Desert Quartet (1990), Frink's penultimate sculpture, was given Grade II* listing in 2007, less than 30 years from its creation. It may be seen on the building opposite Liverpool Gardens. Hand-painted by Gary Bevans over more than five years, English Martyrs' Catholic Church in Goring has the world's only known reproduction of Michelangelo's Sistine Chapel ceiling.

=== Buildings and architecture ===
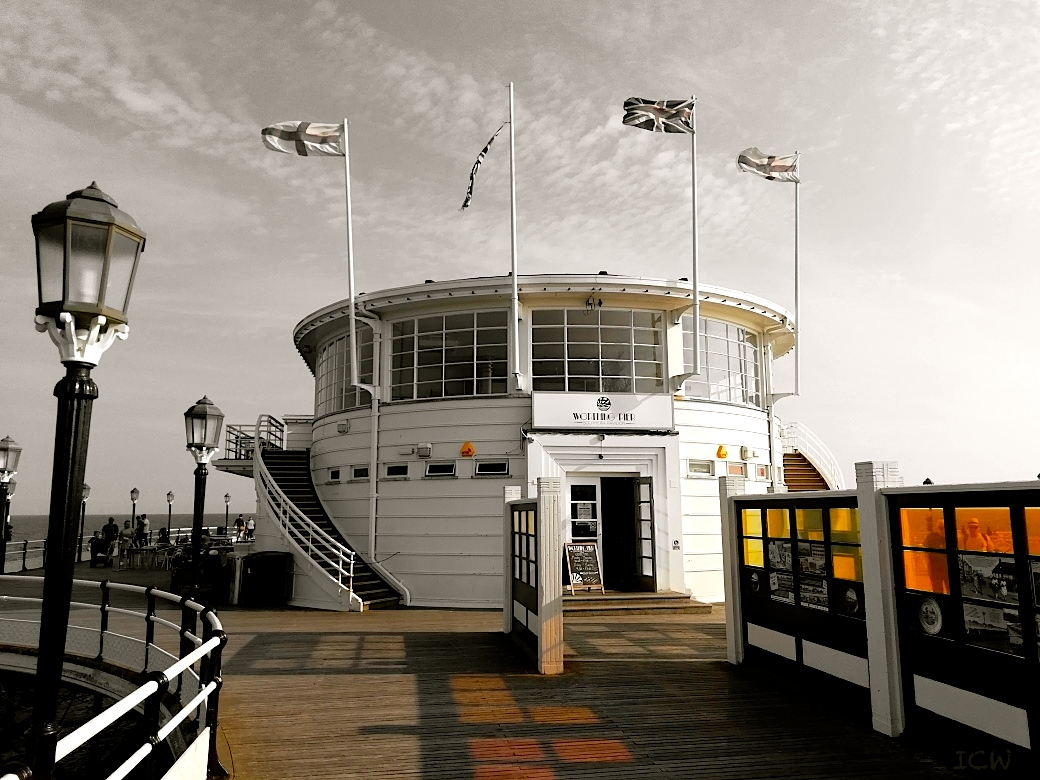
Worthing Pier, an Art Deco masterpiece, 2018

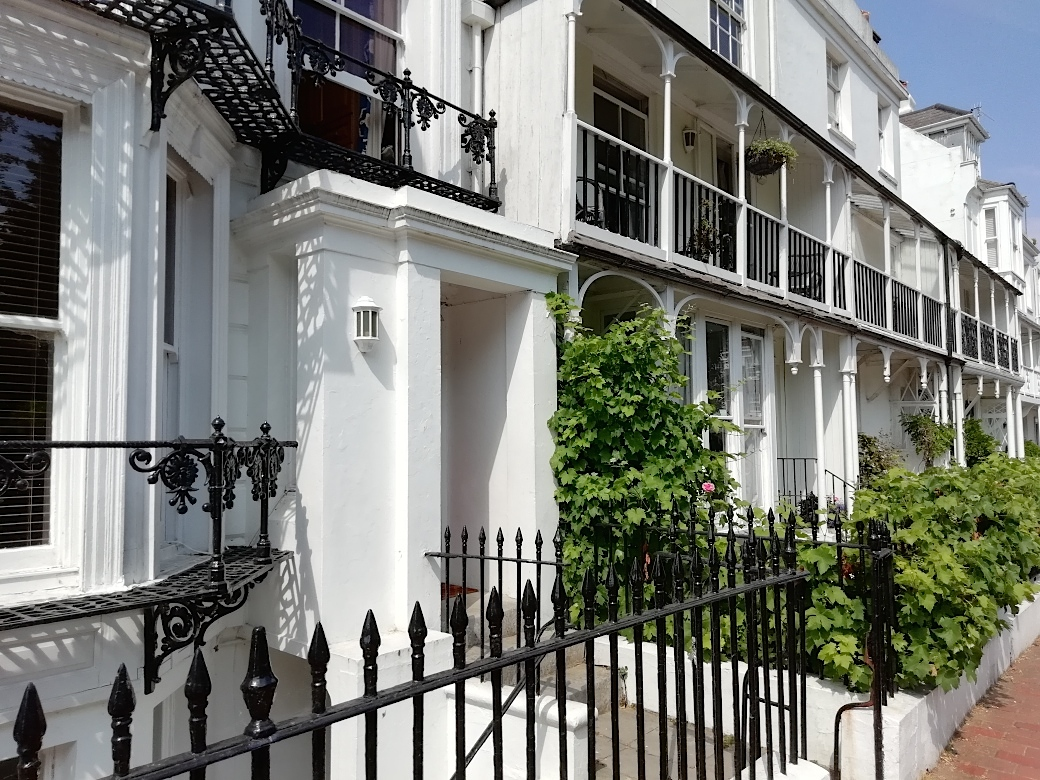
Regency Townouses in Ambrose Place, Worthing

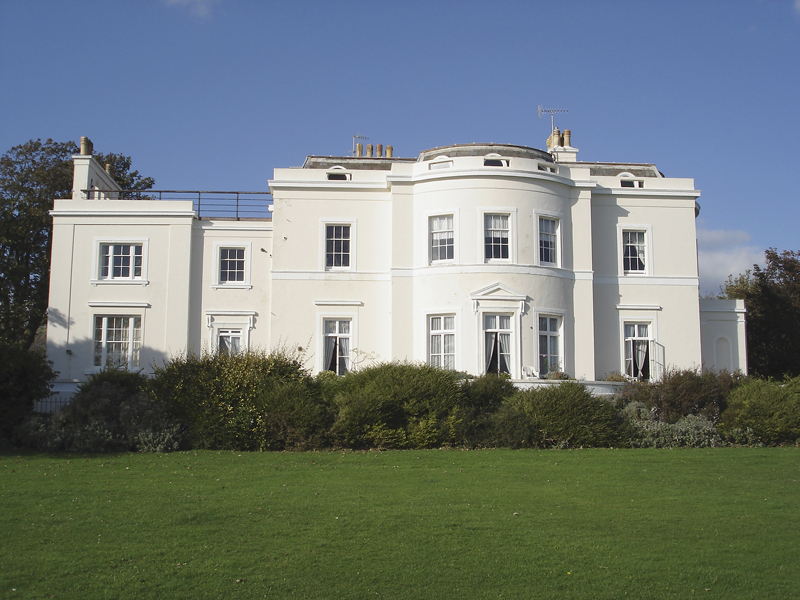
Beach House was built by John Rebecca in the 1820s.

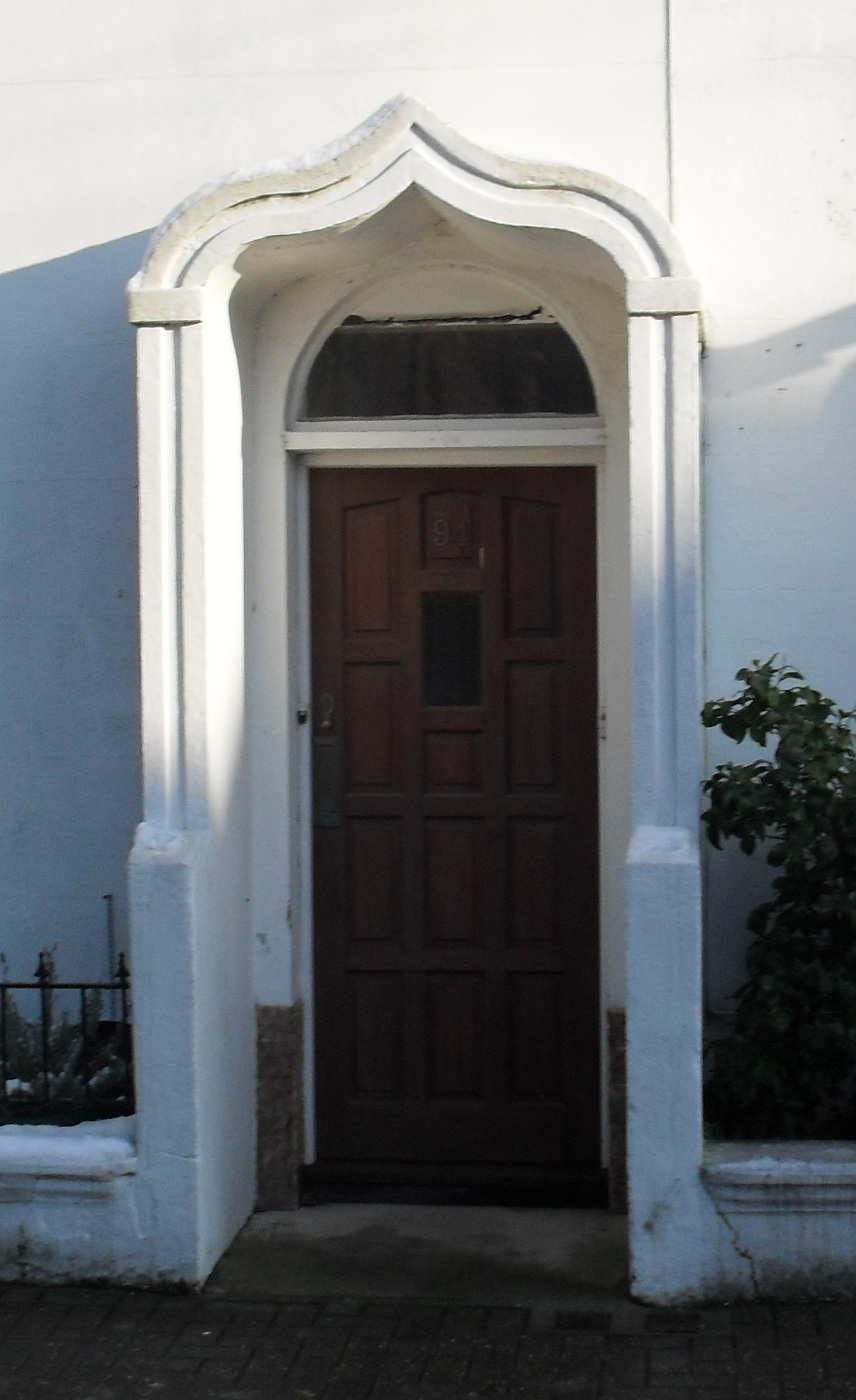
Boat porches are found only in Worthing.

Few structures in central Worthing predate the 19th century, these being a few buildings on Worthing High Street that are survivals from the early fishing hamlet of Worthing. There are some older buildings in the former villages outside the town centre. For example, parts of St Mary's Church in Broadwater date to the Saxon period and West Tarring has several buildings from the medieval and Tudor periods, including St Andrew's Church and the Archbishop's Palace, which date from the 13th century.

There are 213 listed buildings in the borough of Worthing. Three of these—Castle Goring, St Mary's Church at Broadwater and the Archbishop's Palace at West Tarring—are classified at Grade I, which is used for buildings "of exceptional interest, sometimes considered to be internationally important". Worthing Pier, Park Crescent, Beach House and several churches are also listed.

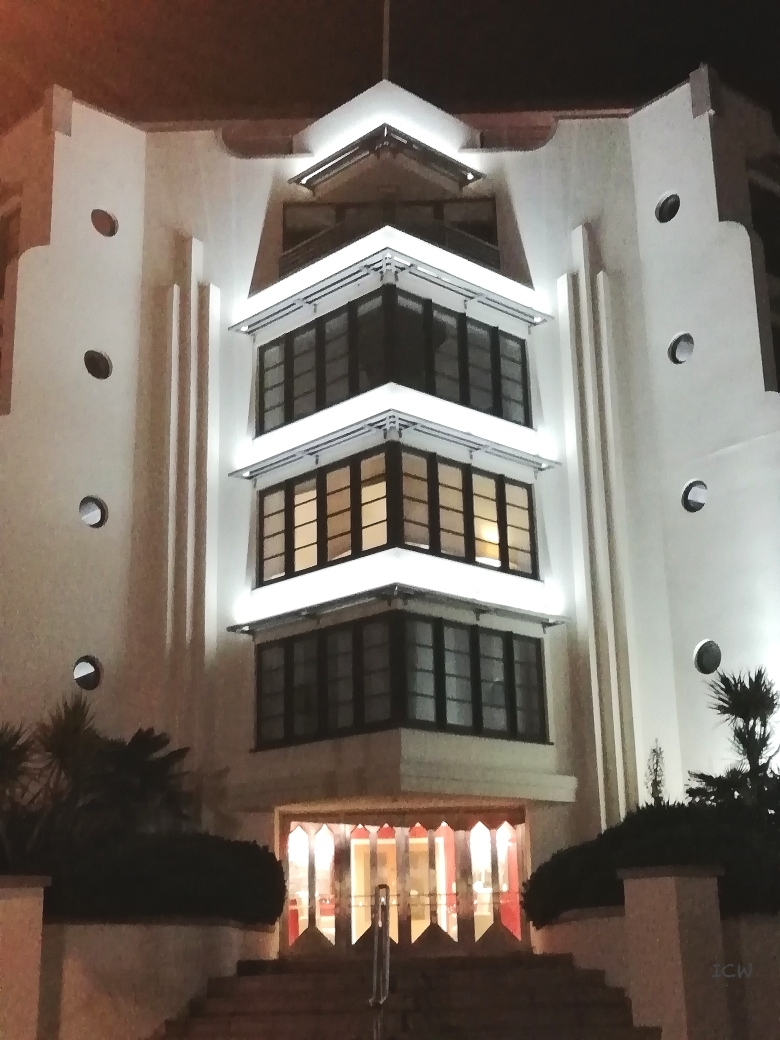
The dramatic Art Deco-inspired Warnes building on Marine Parade, Worthing

Since 1896, when Warwick House was demolished, many historic buildings have been lost and others altered. The town's first and most distinguished theatre, the Theatre Royal, and the adjacent Omega Cottage (the home of the theatre's first manager) were lost in 1970 when the Guildbourne Centre was built; Warne's Hotel and the Royal Sea House burnt down; the early bath-houses which were vital to Worthing's success as a fashionable resort were all demolished in the 20th century; Broadwater's ancient rectory rotted away after it fell out of use in 1924; and several old streets in the town centre had all their buildings demolished for postwar redevelopment.

Pale yellow bricks have been made locally since about 1780, and are commonly encountered as a building material. Flint is the other predominant structural material: its local abundance has ensured its frequent use. The combination of flint and red brick is characteristic of Worthing. In particular, walls built alongside streets or to mark out boundaries were almost always built of flint with brick dressings, especially in the late 19th and early 20th centuries.

Boat porches are a unique architectural feature of Worthing. These structures surround the entrance doors of some early 19th-century houses, and take the form of a stuccoed porch with an ogee-headed roof which resembles the bottom of a boat. Historians have speculated that the cottages, examples of which are in Albert Place, Warwick Place and elsewhere, may have been built by local fishermen who used their boats as a basis for the design.

The town has a small number of residential high-rise buildings including Bayside Vista at 52 metres (172 ft), completed in 2022, and Manor Lea at 43 metres (141 ft), built in 1967. The Splashpoint Leisure Centre won a World Architecture Festival award in 2013.

=== Folklore ===
The Midsummer Tree, an oak, stands near Broadwater Green and is said to be around 300 years old. Until the 19th century, it was believed that on Midsummer's Eve skeletons would rise from the tree and dance around it until dawn, when they would sink back into the ground. The legend was first recorded by folklorist Charlotte Latham in 1868. Since 2006, when the oak was saved from development, meetings have been held on Midsummers Eve there.

It was once believed that monsters known as knuckers lived in bottomless ponds called knuckerholes. There were several knuckerholes in Sussex, including one in Worthing by Ham Bridge (on the present Ham Road), close to East Worthing railway station and Teville Stream.

According to legend, a tunnel several miles long led from the now-demolished medieval Offington Hall to the Neolithic flint mines and Iron Age hill fort at Cissbury. It was said to be sealed, and there was treasure at the far end; the owner of the Hall "had offered half the money to anyone who would clear out the subterranean passage and several persons had begun digging, but all had been driven back by large snakes springing at them with open mouths and angry hisses".

=== Open spaces ===
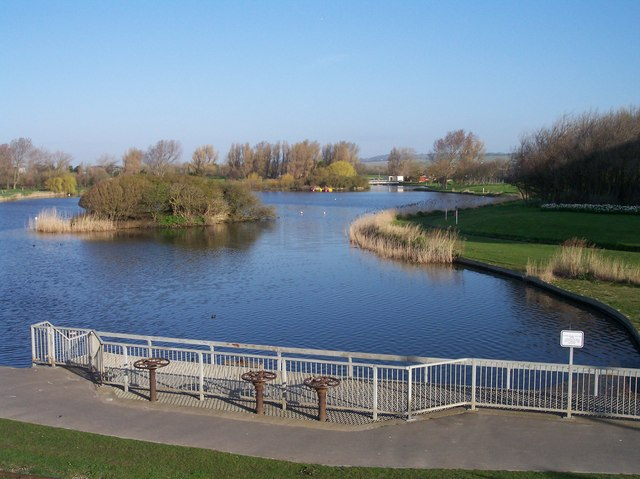
Lake at Brooklands Park.

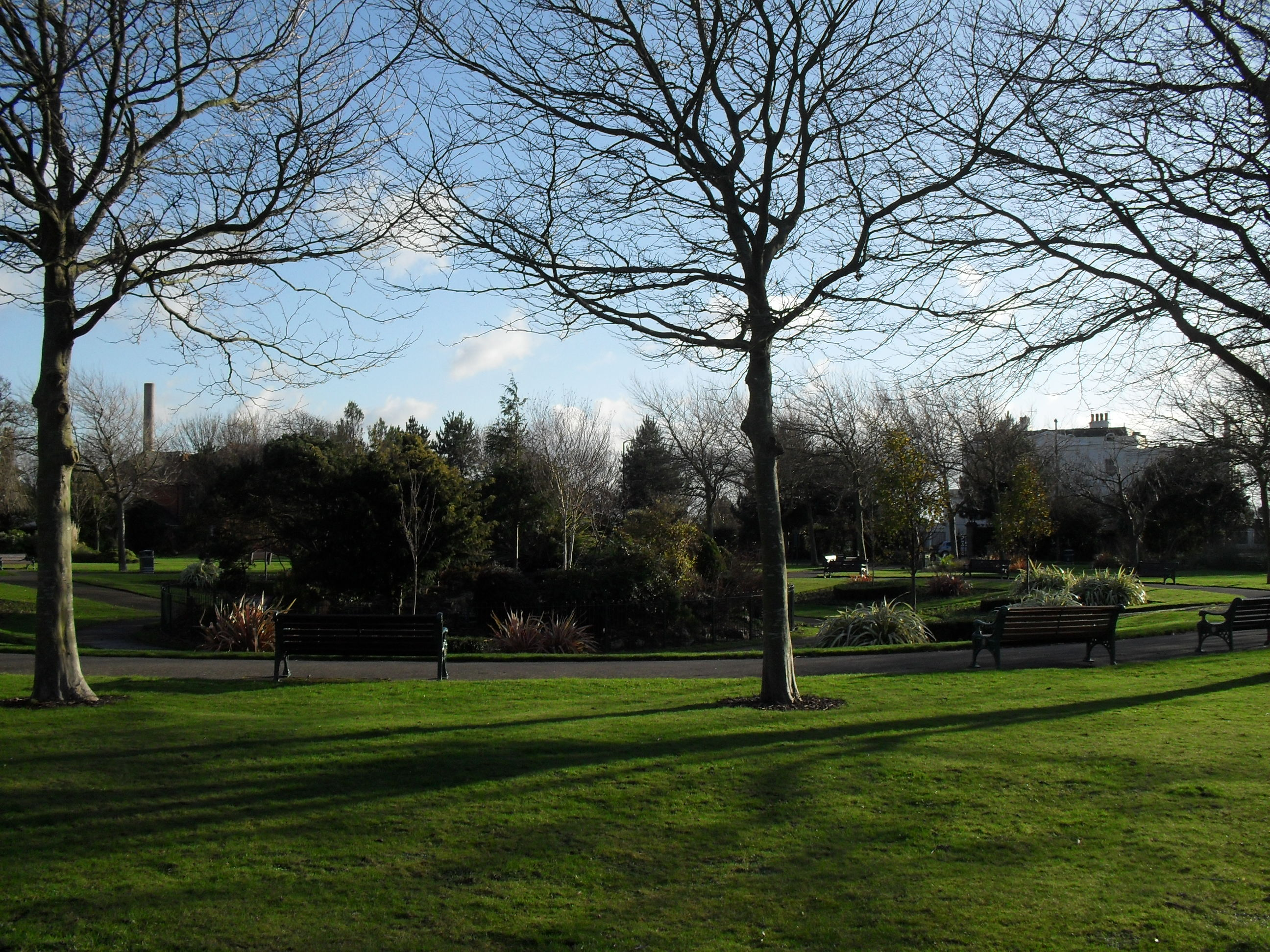
Beach House Park.

The town has five miles of beach and large areas of open space on the South Downs including the Worthing Downland Estate, Cissbury Ring and Highdown Hill. The town also contains a number of parks and gardens, many laid out in the Victorian and Edwardian eras.

- Beach House Green
- Beach House Park – named after nearby Beach House, the park is home to one of the world's most well-known venues for the sport of bowls. The park is also home to a possibly unique memorial to homing pigeons that served in the Second World War.
- Broadwater Green – Broadwater's 'village green'.
- Brooklands Park
- Denton Gardens – at the southern end of Denton Gardens is an 18-hole Crazy Golf course.
- Field Place – tennis courts, lawn bowls, putting and conference facilities. Can be found north of Worthing Leisure Centre.
- Goring Green
- Highdown Gardens – a garden at the foot of the South Downs containing the National Plant Collection of the plant collection of Sir Frederick Stern containing rare plants collected from east Asia.
- Homefield Park – formerly known as the 'People's Park' it was once home to Worthing F.C. also includes a concrete skatepark and tennis courts.
- Liverpool Gardens – overlooking the graceful Georgian Liverpool Terrace, the gardens and terrace are named after Lord Liverpool. Overlooking the park from the east are four bronze heads known as Desert Quartet, sculpted by Dame Elisabeth Frink.
- Marine Gardens
- Tarring Park
- Palatine Park
- Promenade Waterwise Garden
- Steyne Gardens – which includes a sunken garden re-landscaped in 2007 with a fountain of the Ancient Greek sea god, Triton, by sculptor William Bloye.
- Victoria Park – was donated by the Heene Estate to the poor of Worthing in commemoration of the death of Queen Victoria. (Taken from title deeds to property owned in St. Matthews Road.) The land was previously used for market gardening and once sported a paddling pool which was closed due to foot infections in the children. Victoria Park is used by clubs and casual footballers.
- West Park – has a running track and basketball court and lies next to Worthing Leisure Centre.

=== Annual events ===
The Worthing Festival is an annual multi-arts festival that began in 2023. Worthing Artists' Open Houses is an annual festival of arts and crafts. In the last two weeks each July, open-air concerts take place in the town centre with a fairground along the town's promenade. Also taking place in July, Worthing Pride has been celebrated in the town since 2018. From 2008 to 2015, Worthing was the home to the International Birdman competition.

In January, the ancient custom of wassailing takes place in Tarring to bless the apple trees. A flaming torchlit procession takes place down Tarring High Street culminating in hundreds of people gathering around an apple tree to shout, chant and sing to drive away evil spirits. The apple trees are toasted with wassail, apple cider and apple cake, followed by fireworks. On May Day, a procession and dancing takes place in Worthing town centre, culminating in the crowning of the May Queen.

== Media ==
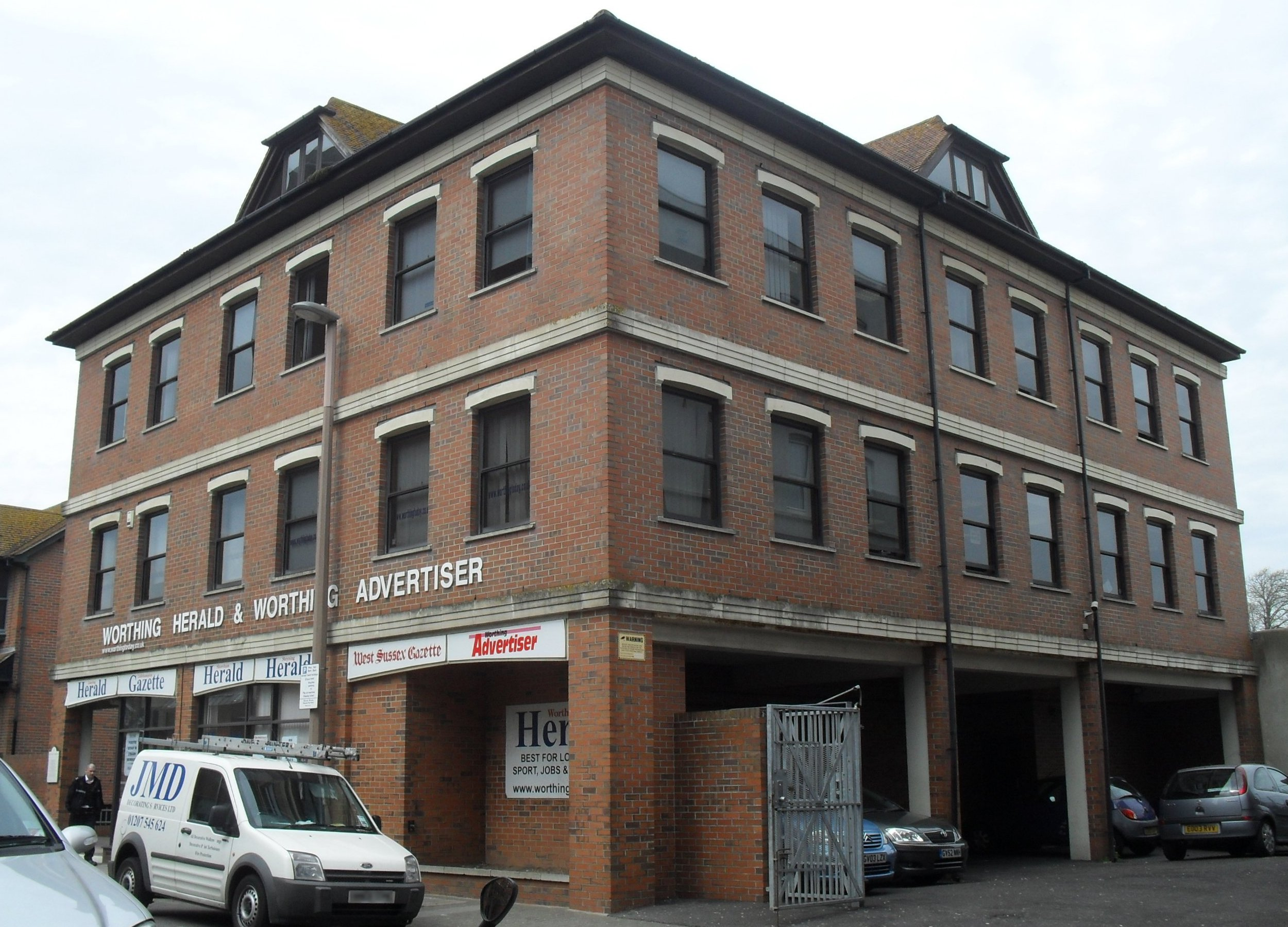
The offices of the Worthing Herald and Worthing Advertiser opened in 1991.

In the early 19th century, Worthing was served by newspapers with a wider geographical circulation, such as the Brighton Gazette, Brighton Herald, Sussex Daily News, Sussex Weekly Advertiser and West Sussex Gazette. Weekly or monthly publications such as the Worthing Visitors' List and Advertising Sheet (notorious for its condemnation of people who had displeased its owner, Owen Breads), the Worthing Monthly Record & District Chronicle and the Worthing Intelligencer provided some local coverage from the middle of the century onwards; but the town's first regular local newspaper was the Worthing Gazette, introduced in 1883. It favoured the Conservative Party at first, and supported the Skeleton Army's anti-Salvation Army riots later that decade.

In 1921 its scope was extended to include Littlehampton, and it was renamed accordingly. The Worthing Herald was founded in 1920; it acquired the Gazette in 1963, but continued to publish the newspapers separately until 1981. Since then, a single newspaper has been published weekly under the Herald name, but it is officially known as the Worthing Herald incorporating the Worthing Gazette. It is now owned by Johnston Press, and has been based at Cannon House in Chatsworth Road since 1991. The Brighton-based daily The Argus, owned by Newsquest, also serves Worthing. An anarchic local newsletter called The Porkbolter, focusing on environmental issues, has been published monthly since 1997.

Worthing is served by the BBC South television studios based in Southampton, BBC South East from Tunbridge Wells, and by the ITV franchise Meridian Broadcasting, also with studios in Southampton. Television signals come from the Rowridge or Whitehawk Hill transmitters.

More Radio Worthing is Worthing's local commercial radio station. Launched in 2003 it broadcasts from the Guildbourne Centre on 107.7FM. Heart South, a Global Radio-owned commercial station, also covers Worthing. BBC Local Radio coverage is provided by BBC Radio Sussex.

== Sport ==
Worthing's 5 miles (8 km) of coastline provide for watersport, especially catamaran racing, windsurfing and kitesurfing. The town has held a regatta for rowing since at least 1859.

The South Downs is commonly used for hiking and mountain-biking, with around 22 trail-heads within the borough. Both of Worthing's golf clubs, including Worthing Golf Club are on the Downs. The Three Forts Marathon is a 27-mile (43 km) ultramarathon from Broadwater to the three Iron Age hill forts of Cissbury Ring, Chanctonbury Ring and Devil's Dyke.

Worthing F.C., nicknamed "The Rebels" or "The Mackerel Men", formed in 1886 is the town's main football club. The men's team play in the National League, having won the 2025-26 National League South and the women's team play in the FA Women's National League South East. Worthing United F.C. nicknamed 'the "Mavericks" were playing in the Division One of the Sussex County League in 2013. Nicknamed Worthing Raiders, Worthing Rugby Football Club play in National League 2 East and since 1977 have been based in the nearby village of Angmering. Formed in 1999 Worthing Thunder play in the National Basketball League. The Worthing Bears (now defunct) won the British Basketball League in 1992—93. Worthing Hockey Club was formed in 1896 and has a number of teams. The home pitches are at Manor Sports Ground.

The promenade is the route used by the Worthing parkrun which has been taking place since June 2016. The free, weekly timed 5 km run had 420 people attending the first event.

Alongside Johannesburg and Adelaide, Worthing is one of only three locations in the world to have hosted the men's World Bowls Championship twice. The events were held in 1972 and 1992, both at Beach House Park, which is sometimes known as the spiritual home of bowls, and is also the venue for the annual National Championships each August. Beach House Park also hosted the Women's World Bowls Championship in 1977.

Club	Nickname	Sport	League	Venue	Established
Worthing Cricket Club		Cricket	Sussex Premier League	Manor Sports Ground	1855
Worthing Football Club	The Rebels	Football	National League	Woodside Road	1886
Worthing Rugby Football Club	Raiders	Rugby union	National League 2 East	Roundstone Lane, Angmering	1920
Worthing United Football Club	The Mavericks	Football	Southern Combination Football League	Robert Albon Memorial Ground	1988
Worthing Thunder	Thunder	Basketball	English Basketball League	Worthing Leisure Centre	1999
Worthing F.C. Women	The Rebels or the Reds	Football	FA Women's National League South East	Woodside Road	

== Notable people ==
Notable inhabitants include:

- Britt Allcroft, writer/director/producer best known for creating Thomas the Tank Engine and Friends
- Luke Nelson, basketball player, born and raised in Worthing and first played basketball for the Worthing Thunder youth teams.
- Jane Austen, author, lived at Stanford Cottage, Worthing, during the autumn of 1805. Her unfinished novel Sanditon (1817) is set in the early days of the development of Worthing as a resort.
- Mary Shelley, author of the 1818 novel Frankenstein; or, The Modern Prometheus , inherited Castle Goring in 1845.
- Oscar Wilde, author, wrote The Importance of Being Earnest while staying in Worthing during the summer of 1894 and even named its protagonist, Jack Worthing, in its honour.
- Liz Smith, actress, 'The Vicar of Dibley', 'The Royle Family'.
- David Remfry, painter and curator
- Henty brothers, Australian pioneer farmers including Edward Henty, born in West Tarring in 1810
- James Bateman, horticulturalist
- Thomas Shaw Brandreth, mathematician and inventor
- Copley Fielding, artist
- Octav Botnar, founder of Datsun UK, ran his automobile import business from the town
- Gwendoline Christie, actress, model
- Nicollette Sheridan, actress, Desperate Housewives, birthplace
- DJ Fresh, musician, birthplace
- Christopher Hewett, actor, Mr. Belvedere
- William Henry Hudson, writer and naturalist born in Argentina
- Billy Idol, musician, lived and attended high school in the town
- Mike Kerr, singer and bassist of British rock duo Royal Blood, grew up in the town.
- Keith Emerson, musician, lived and attended school in the town
- Peter Bonetti, England goalkeeper
- Byron Dafoe, National Hockey League goaltender
- Patrick Hadley, English composer. Went to Saint Ronan's School West Worthing
- Kenny Tutt, English chef and winner of the MasterChef 2018 UK TV show competition
- Laurence Olivier, actor, born at Wathen Road, Dorking, Surrey in 1908
- Anthony A. Barrett, Classical scholar and author
- Henry Behrens, sideshow performer
- Luke Pritchard, lead singer for The Kooks

In the 20th century, these writers chose to live in the town:

- Beatrice Hastings, poet
- Harold Pinter

== Twin towns ==
Worthing is twinned with two rural districts; four small towns in the Eltztal region of Germany — Waldkirch, Elzach, Gutach im Breisgau and Simonswald, since 1997 and the Pays des Olonnes in France that includes the seaside town of Les Sables-d'Olonne, since 1998.
