= Davison High School =

Davison Church of England High School for Girls
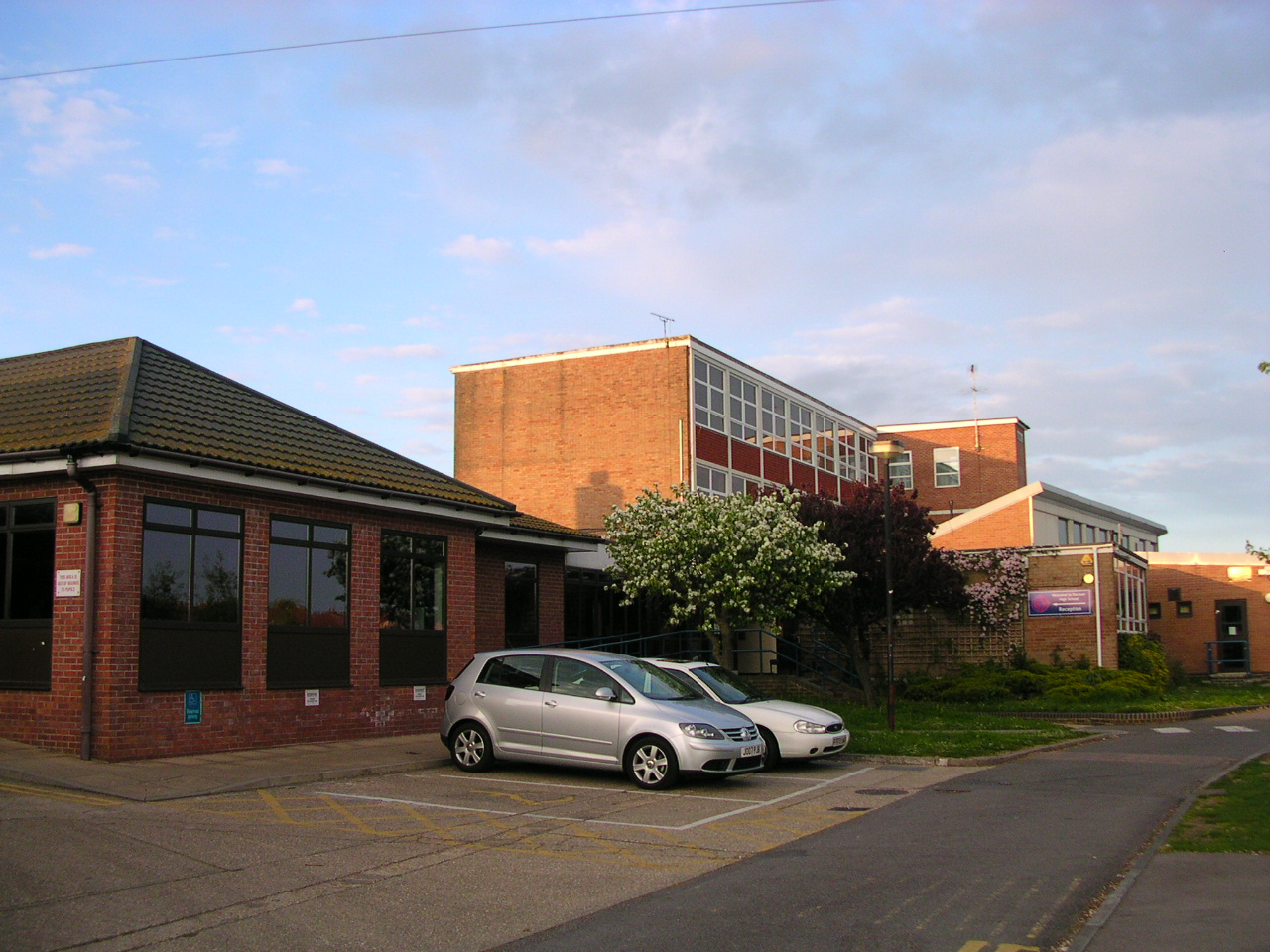

Location
- Selborne Road; Worthing, West Sussex, BN11 2JX; England; 50°49′10″N 0°21′22″W

Information
- Type: Voluntary controlled school
- Motto: Ora et Labora ('Pray and Work').
- Religious affiliation: Church of England
- Founder: Rev Davison 1812
- Local authority: West Sussex
- Department for Education URN: 126093 Tables
- Ofsted: Reports
- Headteacher: Jayne Lewis-Tutt
- Gender: AFAB/ Female
- Age: 11 to 16
- Enrolment: 1320
- Colours: Navy blue and red
- Website: http://www.davison.w-sussex.sch.uk/

Davison High School is a girls' Church of England secondary school serving pupils aged 11 to 16 in Worthing, West Sussex, England. In its last inspection the school was judged by OFSTED as Outstanding. The school accommodates around 1320 girls across five year groups.

The original Davison School was a boys' school, opened on Chapel Road in 1812 and named after the Reverend William Davison, the first chaplain of St Paul's Church, Worthing. The school moved to its current site off Selborne Road in 1960. The culverted Teville Stream, once known as the Selbourne, flows under the school's playing fields.

The school is the home of the Davison Worthing Youth Concert Band which gives opportunities to any age or ability to join.

== Notable former pupils ==
- Prof Emma Bunce, Professor of Planetary Plasma Physics at the University of Leicester, won the Chapman Medal in 2018
