= Teville Gate =

Construction site and former shopping centre in Worthing, United Kingdom

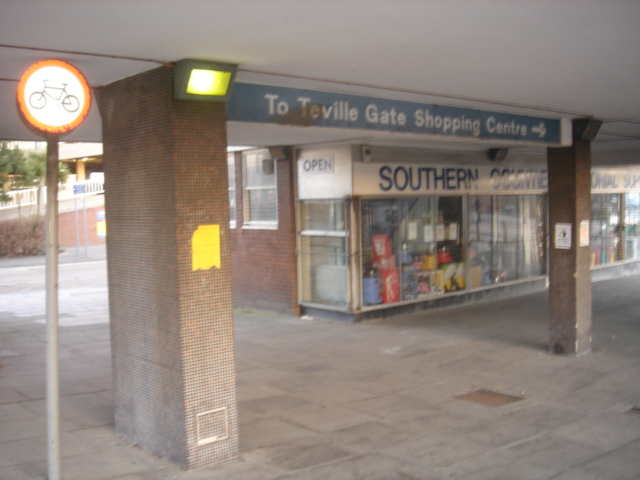
- The former Teville Gate shopping centre

- Location within West Sussex
- Former names: Teville Gate Shopping Centre (1960s–2018)

General information
- Status: Under redevelopment
- Location: Railway Approach, Worthing, West Sussex, England
- Coordinates: 50.8178°N 0.3739°W
- Year built: 2019–2021 (HMRC office block)
- Groundbreaking: June 2018 (demolition of multi‑storey car park)
- Opened: May 2021 (HMRC office block)
- Demolished: June 2018 (former multi‑storey car park)
- Cost: £29 million (HMRC office block build)
- Owner: Mosaic; Hanson

Technical details
- Floor area: 8,550 m² (HMRC office block)
- Grounds: 1.4 ha (3.5 acre)

Design and construction
- Architects: AROS Architects (Station Square masterplan); LCE Architects (Block A art deco redesign)
- Developer: Mosaic (majority site); Hanson (Teville Gate House/HMRC block)

Teville Gate is a construction site and car park in Worthing, West Sussex, England. Covering about 1.4 hectares (3.5 acres) the site lies at the main entrance to the town centre of Worthing for both rail, via Worthing railway station, and road, via the A24 and A27. The site is bounded by Railway Approach to the north, the A24 Broadwater Road to the east, the A2031 Teville Road to the south and Grand Victorian Hotel to the west.

Teville Gate takes its name from the former tollgate that stood on the site for the Worthing to West Grinstead turnpike, close to the Teville Stream which flows through the area.

== Proposed developments ==
=== 1998 Farrho proposal ===
A scheme from 1998 proposed a new cinema built in place of the multi-storey car park.

=== 2006-10 Hanson proposal ===
A £150 million development was put forward by Hanson which would have included more than 200 flats in twin towers, conference centre, hotel, multiplex cinema and supermarket received planning permission in 2010. The lending bank prevented the owner from signing the section 106 agreement and the approval fell and the bank then foreclosed.

=== 2015-20 proposals from Mosaic and Hanson ===
==== Teville Gate House ====
In 2015 ownership of the site was divided between Mosaic (formerly Mosaique), which took control of the majority of the site, with Hanson retaining the former Teville Gate House. With planning approval granted in June 2019, a month later Hanson had begun work on constructing a £29 million build cost five-storey 8,550 m^{2} (92,000 sq ft) office block for HM Revenue and Customs (HMRC). HMRC moved in to the building in mid May 2021, one of five specialist sites across the UK. The building was formally opened in November 2022. It is a specialist site that mostly houses employees working in finance, HR and digital roles.

==== Station Square ====
In 2018 AROS Architects designed new proposals for the site, named Station Square, which went out to consultation. In February 2019 Mosaic submitted a £93 million proposal to include 378 homes, a supermarket, an 83-bed hotel, gym and space for some retail and restaurants. The application includes three buildings, including one main tower, rising to a maximum of 22 storeys. LCE Architects modified part of the 2018 designs from AROS to include changing block A at the corner of Teville Road and Broadwater Road to reflect the local influence of Art Deco within Worthing. A decision was expected to be given on the planning application for the rest of the site owned by Mosaic on 4 March 2020. If built, Block C would be the tallest building in Worthing at 66 metres (217 ft) tall (22 storeys), taller than Bayside which stands at 52 metres (172 ft) tall (15 storeys).

== Previous uses of the site ==
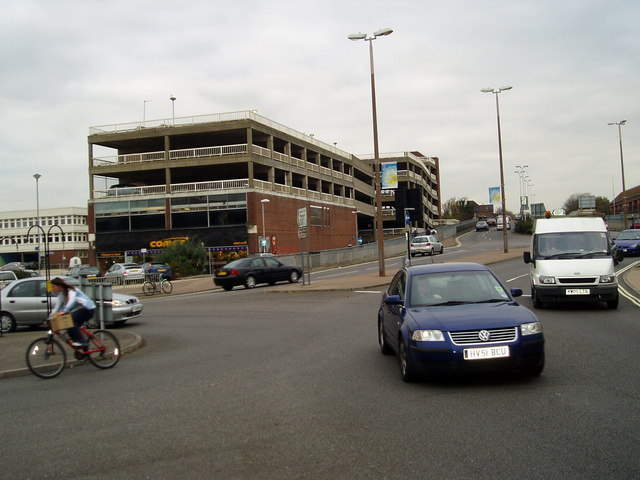
The multi-storey car park at the former Teville Gate shopping centre was demolished in 2018.

- Teville Common - in the 17th to early 19th centuries land by the Teville Stream formed the Teville Common, which was used as common land for the grazing of livestock. When the direct Worthing to West Grinstead turnpike opened in 1802 a turnpike gate was put up near the Teville pond. The gate was removed in 1823 following protests.
- Victorian houses - over the 19th century, homes were built along Teville Road (previously Vapours Lane) and Railway Approach.
- Teville Gate shopping centre - was built in the 1960s. Its multi-storey car park was demolished in June 2018. The £1.6 million demolition cost was funded from the Local Growth Fund provided by the Coast to Capital Local Enterprise Partnership.

== See also ==
- Bayside, Worthing
