= High Salvington =

Neighbourhood of Worthing, West Sussex, England

Coordinates: 50.84894°N 0.40641°W

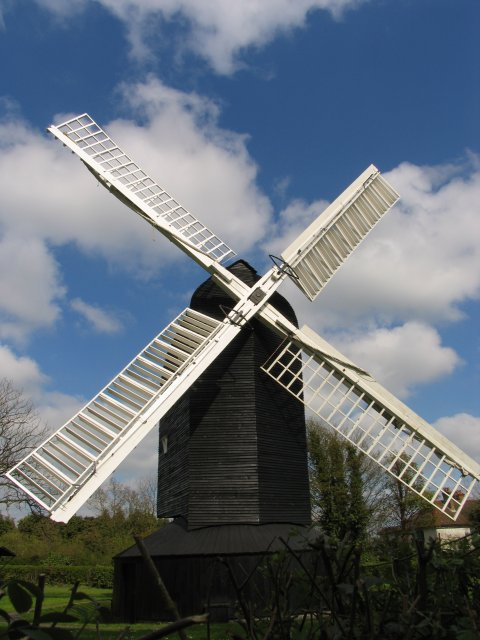
- High Salvington windmill

- Location within West Sussex
- OS grid reference: TQ122066
- District: Worthing
- Shire county: West Sussex
- Region: South East
- Country: England
- Sovereign state: United Kingdom
- Post town: WORTHING
- Postcode district: BN13 3
- Dialling code: 01903
- Police: Sussex
- Fire: West Sussex
- Ambulance: South East Coast
- UK Parliament: Worthing West

High Salvington is a neighbourhood of Worthing, in the borough of Worthing in West Sussex, England. It is centred 2.5 miles (4.0 km) northwest of the town centre and is north of the A27.

== History ==
=== Pre-history ===
At the top of West Hill in High Salvington are remains of Neolithic huts, possibly used by Neolithic flint miners. High Salvington may have one of only a few flint mines in Britain, however since the fields containing the possible mines were disturbed by plough use this cannot be made definite.

=== Development and preservation of the South Downs ===
At High Salvington after 1923, despite the protests of preservationists, many large detached houses of various styles spread almost to the top of Salvington Hill. Housing in the locality reaches higher up the South Downs than anywhere else in Worthing, reaching the 120 metre contour. Many old trees and banks were retained, especially in Salvington Hill.

Unlike Salvington to the south, High Salvington was part of the parish of Durrington until it became part of the borough of Worthing in 1929.

== Geography ==
High Salvington is on the sea-facing upper slopes of the South Downs north of Salvington and Worthing, and is separated from Findon Valley by The Gallops, a public parkland.

== Landmarks ==
The main landmark is High Salvington windmill, which has been restored to a working condition over the last 30 years. The windmill is open every first and third Sunday afternoon during the months April to September, for the public to view.

== Amenities ==
=== Commercial ===
Since 2022, the neighbourhood has had a micro pub/cafe/barbershop The Refreshment Rooms alongside regular street food vendors at the weekends.

=== Religious ===
- St Peter's Church, Anglican, was built in 1928 is largely made of corrugated iron and glass.
- St Michael's Catholic Church, which moved to its present location from Durrington in 1966.

== Politics ==
Together with Findon Valley, High Salvington is part of the Cissbury electoral division of West Sussex.

== Notable inhabitants ==
The actress Nancy Price lived in a cottage, 'Arcana', in Heather Lane.
