= Highdown Hill =

Hill in West Sussex, England

Coordinates: 50.8286°N 0.4505°W

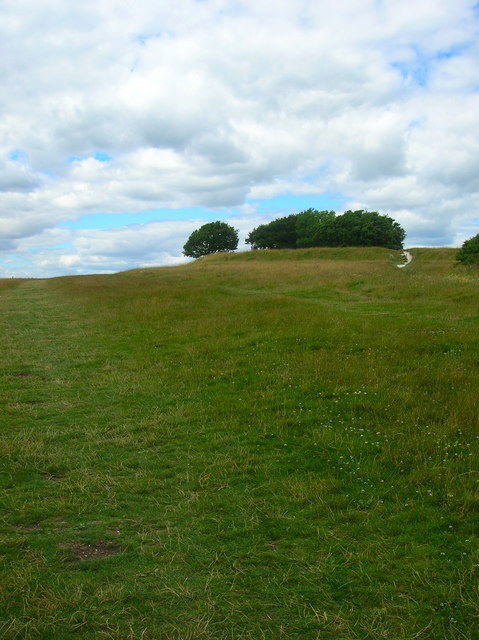
Remains of the hill fort on Highdown Hill

Highdown Hill is a hill in the South Downs, with a height of 81 metres (266 ft). The summit of the hill and its western slopes lie in the parish of Ferring in the Arun district, while its eastern slopes lie in the borough of Worthing. It is a popular spot for picnickers, dog-walkers and horse riders. It overlooks Littlehampton, Angmering, Ferring and Worthing with views as far east as the Seven Sisters and west to the Isle of Wight.

It is the property of the National Trust.

To the north, the ancient hill forts of Cissbury Ring and Chanctonbury Ring can be seen, and the visible remains of a Bronze Age hill fort exist on the summit of Highdown Hill. Highdown Hill is the traditional burial-place of the kings of Sussex.

At the base of the hill, there is a car park, toilets, public gardens, cafe, hotel and restaurant.

== Early history ==
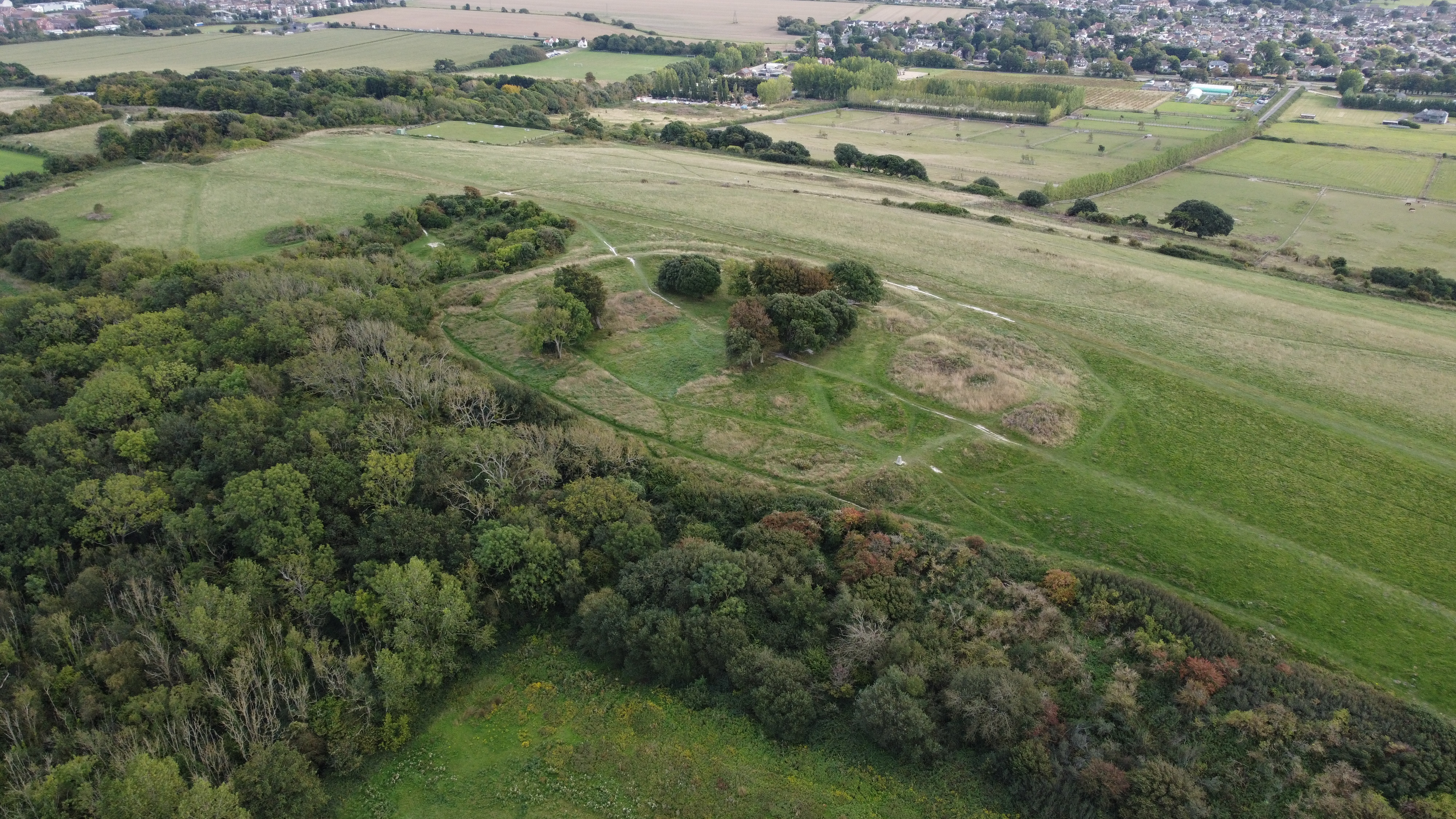
Aerial photo of the hill fort atop Highdown Hill looking generally southeast

Human occupation of the hill is thought to have started in the Late Bronze Age (around 1000 BC) when an enclosure was built. By the Early Iron Age (around 600 BC) this had been replaced by a hill fort composed of a single rampart and ditch. An Anglo-Saxon cemetery was created on the site around 450 AD which has produced an unusual number of glass objects, which can now be seen in Worthing Museum. This cemetery was discovered by accident in the 1890s when local landowner Edwin Henty undertook tree planting inside the hillfort. His workmen had discarded or stolen much material before a full excavation could begin.

Excavations continued for the next two seasons under guidance from Charles Hercules Read, the Secretary of the Society of Antiquaries at the time. 86 Anglo-Saxon graves were uncovered between 1893 and 1894 and the contents of all of these grave cuts were listed and several of them drawn. A plan of the cemetery was never drawn up. At the time, several skeletons were left in their graves whilst others were uncovered. A large number of bones and artefacts were passed around various local museums and many of these have since been lost.

== 18th century ==
In the 18th century, the miller John Olliver had his tomb built on the hill 27 years before his death in 1793. It is said that he was in fact the leader of local smugglers and used the tomb to store contraband. He would set the sails of his windmill at different angles to indicate the absence of customs men to his followers out at sea. The remains of the mill can still be seen on the west side of the hill. Local legend has it that a runaway millstone from this mill is the source of the name Roundstone for the farm at the foot of the hill, which was subsequently used for the nearby pub and garden centre.

== 20th century ==
During World War II a radar station was built on the hill and considerable damage was done to the archaeology during its construction. Further damage was done as trees were uprooted following the Great Storm of 1987 leading to a rescue dig in 1988.

== Highdown Hill today ==
Highdown Gardens lie in a former chalk pit below the hill. Highdown Vineyard is a working vineyard producing English Wines on the southern slope of the hill. Roundstone is the name associated with a farm, pub and several local businesses below Highdown Hill. Based on local legend, the name derives from a runaway millstone from the mill on the hill.
