= Findon Valley =

Neighbourhood of Worthing, West Sussex, England

Coordinates: 50.85207°N 0.39966°W

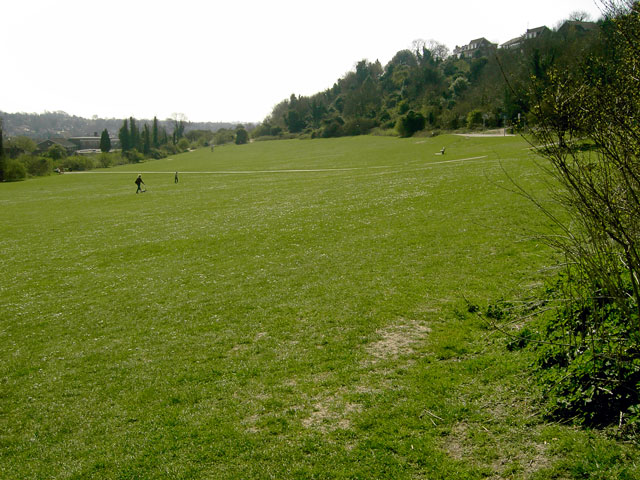
- The Gallops, Findon Valley

- Location within West Sussex
- OS grid reference: TQ127070
- District: Worthing
- Shire county: West Sussex
- Region: South East
- Country: England
- Sovereign state: United Kingdom
- Police: Sussex
- Fire: West Sussex
- Ambulance: South East Coast
- UK Parliament: East Worthing and Shoreham

Findon Valley is a neighbourhood of Worthing, in the borough of Worthing in West Sussex, England. It lies on the A24 road 2.9 miles (4.7 km) north of the town centre.

The settlement of Findon Valley is named after the dry valley through the South Downs on which it lies. Like other dry downland valleys, Findon Valley was created during the last ice age when chalk that was being frozen prevented water from seeping downwards through the chalk. In summer, streams of melting ice would flow down off the Weald across the Downs, creating the dry valleys such as Findon Valley.

The settlement of Findon Valley is bordered to the west and east by land in the South Downs National Park. To the west, it is bordered by parkland and downland known as 'the Gallops' and to the east by the steep slopes of Mount Carvey which forms part of the Worthing Downland Estate and to the north-east the prehistoric site of Cissbury. It is separated from the village of Findon by a strategic gap - also part of the South Downs National Park. Findon Valley was built from the 1930s to 1950s, with its library having been built in 1958. It is also home to the Vale School, All Saints Parish Church, Findon Valley Free Church and a parade of shops.

Notable former residents of Findon Valley include the composer Charles Williams.
