= Philip Sidney, 2nd Viscount De L'Isle =

British Viscount (born 1945)

Major The Right Honourable The Viscount De L'Isle CVO MBE CStJ DL
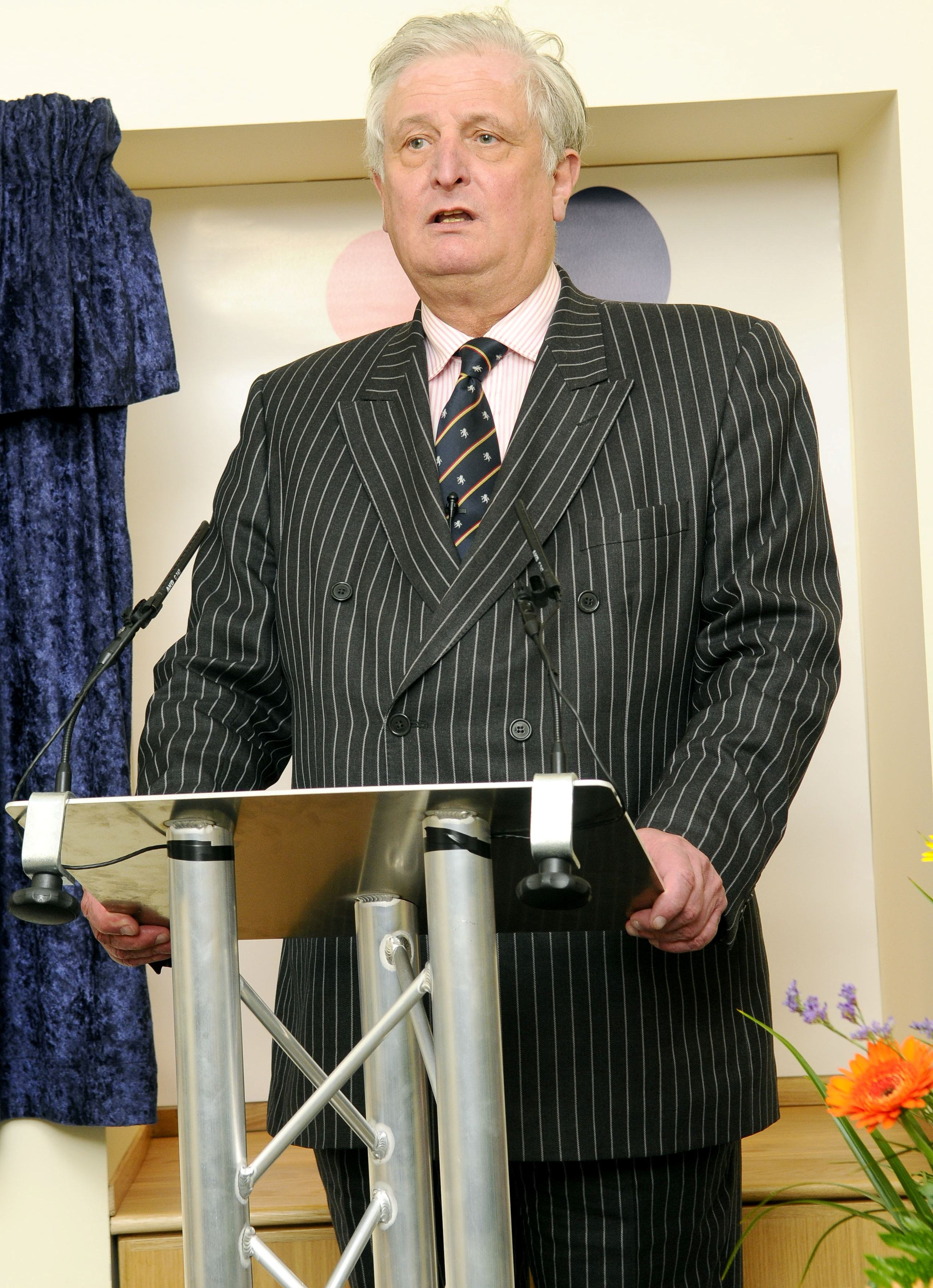

Lord Lieutenant of Kent
- In office 1 September 2011 – 21 April 2020
- Monarch: Elizabeth II
- Preceded by: Allan Willett
- Succeeded by: Annabel Campbell, Baroness Colgrain

Member of the House of Lords
- Lord Temporal
- In office 5 April 1991 – 11 November 1999 as a hereditary peer
- Preceded by: The 1st Viscount De L'Isle
- Succeeded by: Seat abolished (Note: Pursuant to the House of Lords Act 1999.)

Personal details
- Born: Philip John Algernon Sidney; 21 April 1945 (age 81)
- Spouse: Isobel Compton (m. 1980)
- Children: 2
- Parent(s): William Sidney, 1st Viscount De L'Isle; Jacqueline Vereker
- Education: Royal Military Academy Sandhurst
- Other titles: 7th Baron De L'Isle and Dudley; 10th Baronet; 8th Baronet

Military service
- Allegiance: United Kingdom
- Branch/service: British Army
- Years of service: 1966–1979
- Rank: Major
- Unit: Rifle Brigade; Grenadier Guards
- Battles/wars: The Troubles

Philip John Algernon Sidney, 2nd Viscount De L'Isle (born 21 April 1945), is a British hereditary peer and former soldier.

== Life and career ==
Lord De L'Isle is the only son of William Sidney, 1st Viscount De L'Isle, and his wife Jacqueline (née Vereker), a daughter of Field Marshal John Vereker, 6th Viscount Gort. He was educated at Tabley House, Mons Officer Cadet School and the Royal Military Academy Sandhurst. After service in the Rifle Brigade, in 1966, he became a major in the Grenadier Guards and took early retirement in 1979, having spent some of his service in Northern Ireland during The Troubles.

De L'Isle was appointed Vice-Lieutenant of Kent in 2002 and is also a Freeman of the City of London and a member of the Worshipful Company of Goldsmiths. On 1 September 2011, he was appointed Lord Lieutenant of Kent. He was appointed Commander of the Order of Saint John in 2012, and Commander of the Royal Victorian Order (CVO) in the 2019 Birthday Honours.

== Personal life ==
On 15 November 1980, De L'Isle married Isobel Tresyllian Compton, youngest daughter of civil servant Sir Edmund Compton. They have two children: Sophia Jacqueline Mary Sidney (born 1983) and Philip William Edmund Sidney (born 1985).

Viscount De L'Isle succeeded to his father's titles in 1991. The family seat is Penshurst Place in Kent.

== Ancestry ==
Viscount De L'Isle is a descendant of King William IV though his illegitimate daughter Lady Sophia FitzClarence. His ancestors also include the Lords Kinnaird, the Viscounts Gort and the Viscounts Gage. He is also a descendant of Anne Plantagenet, Duchess of Exeter, sister to Kings Edward IV and Richard III.

Ancestors of Philip Sidney, 2nd Viscount De L'Isle

Philip Sidney, 1st Baron De L'Isle and Dudley
Philip Sidney, 2nd Baron De L'Isle and Dudley
Lady Sophia FitzClarence
William Sidney, 5th Baron De L'Isle and Dudley
Sir William Foulis, 8th Baronet
Mary Foulis
Mary Jane Ross
William Sidney, 1st Viscount De L'Isle
Robert Cooper Lee Bevan
Roland Yorke Bevan
Agneta Elizabeth Yorke
Winifred Agneta Yorke Bevan
Arthur Kinnaird, 10th Lord Kinnaird
Hon. Agneta Olivia Kinnaird
Mary Jane Hoare
Philip Sidney, 2nd Viscount De L'Isle
Standish Vereker, 4th Viscount Gort
John Vereker, 5th Viscount Gort
Caroline Harriet Gage
John Vereker, 6th Viscount Gort
R. S. Surtees
Eleanor Surtees
Elizabeth Jane Fenwick
Hon. Jacqueline Vereker
Hon. John Vereker
George Vereker
Louisa Medlicott
Corinna Vereker
Robert Manders
Frances Manders

== Notes ==
Honorary titles
Preceded by Allan Willett	Lord Lieutenant of Kent; 2011–2020	Succeeded by The Lady Colgrain
Peerage of the United Kingdom
Preceded by William Sidney	Viscount De L'Isle; 1991–present Member of the House of Lords (1991–1999)	Incumbent; Heir apparent: Hon. Philip Sidney
Preceded by William Sidney	Baron De L'Isle and Dudley; 1991–present	Incumbent; Heir apparent: Hon. Philip Sidney
Baronetage of the United Kingdom
Preceded by William Sidney	Baronet of Castle Goring; 1991–present	Incumbent; Heir apparent: Hon. Philip Sidney
Preceded by William Sidney	Baronet of Penshurst Place; 1991–present	Incumbent; Heir apparent: Hon. Philip Sidney
