= Viscount De L'Isle =

Title in the Peerage of the United Kingdom

- Blazon: Arms: Quarterly: 1st and 4th, Or a Pheon Azure (Sidney); 2nd and 3rd, Sable on a Fess engrailed between three Whelk Shells Or a Mullet for difference (Shelley).; Crests: 1st: a Porcupine statant Azure quilled collared and chained Or; 2nd: a Griffin's Head erased Argent ducally gorged Or.; Supporters: Dexter: a Porcupine Azure quilled collared and chained Or; Sinister: a Lion queue fourche Vert
- Creation date: 12 January 1956
- Created by: Queen Elizabeth II
- Peerage: Peerage of the United Kingdom
- First holder: William Sidney, 1st Viscount De L'Isle
- Present holder: Philip Sidney, 2nd Viscount De L'Isle
- Heir apparent: the Hon. Philip William Edmund Sidney
- Subsidiary titles: Baron De L'Isle and Dudley; Baronet "of Castle Goring"; Baronet "of Penshurst Place"
- Status: Extant
- Seat: Penshurst Place
- Motto: QUO FATA VOCANT (Whither the Fates call me)

Viscount De L'Isle, of Penshurst in the County of Kent, is a title in the Peerage of the United Kingdom. It was created in 1956 for William Sidney, 6th Baron de L'Isle and Dudley (1909–1991).

== History ==
This branch of the Shelley family descends from John Shelley-Sidney, the son of the second marriage of Sir Bysshe Shelley, 1st Baronet, of Castle Goring (see Shelley baronets of Castle Goring for earlier history of the family), by Elizabeth Jane Perry, daughter of William Perry and Elizabeth Sidney, daughter and heir of the Hon. Thomas Sidney, fourth son of Robert Sidney, 4th Earl of Leicester (a title which had become extinct in 1743; see the Earl of Leicester 1618 creation). In 1799 he assumed by royal licence the additional surname of Sidney on succeeding to the estates, including Penshurst Place in Kent, of his maternal grandmother. In 1818 he was created a Baronet, of Penshurst in the County of Kent, in the Baronetage of the United Kingdom.

His son and heir apparent, Philip Sidney, represented Eye in the House of Commons. In 1835, fourteen years before succeeding his father in the baronetcy, he was raised to the Peerage of the United Kingdom as Baron De L'Isle and Dudley, of Penshurst in the County of Kent. He was son-in-law of then King William IV. The title derived from the fact that the title of "Viscount De L'Isle" had been held by his ancestors the Earls of Leicester (in turn deriving from their ancestors), but had become extinct along with the earldom in 1743. The title of "Dudley" came from the fact that Robert Sidney, 1st Earl of Leicester (of the 1618 creation), was the nephew of Robert Dudley, 1st Earl of Leicester (of the 1564 creation), the fifth son of John Dudley, 1st Duke of Northumberland, who was as well Viscount Lisle by right of his mother. Lord De L'Isle and Dudley discontinued the use of the surname Shelley.

His grandson, the fifth Baron (who only held the titles for two months in 1945 after succeeding his elder brother), notably served as Mayor of Chelsea and was a member of the London County Council. His son, the sixth Baron, was a prominent Conservative politician and served as Secretary of State for Air from 1951 to 1955. In 1956, he was created Viscount De L'Isle, of Penshurst in the County of Kent, in the Peerage of the United Kingdom. Lord De L'Isle later served as Governor-General of Australia. In 1965 he also succeeded his kinsman as the ninth Baronet of Castle Goring. As of 2017 the titles are held by his son, the second Viscount, who succeeded in 1991.

As heir of the college's founder, Lord De L'Isle is the hereditary visitor of Sidney Sussex College, Cambridge.

== Family seat ==
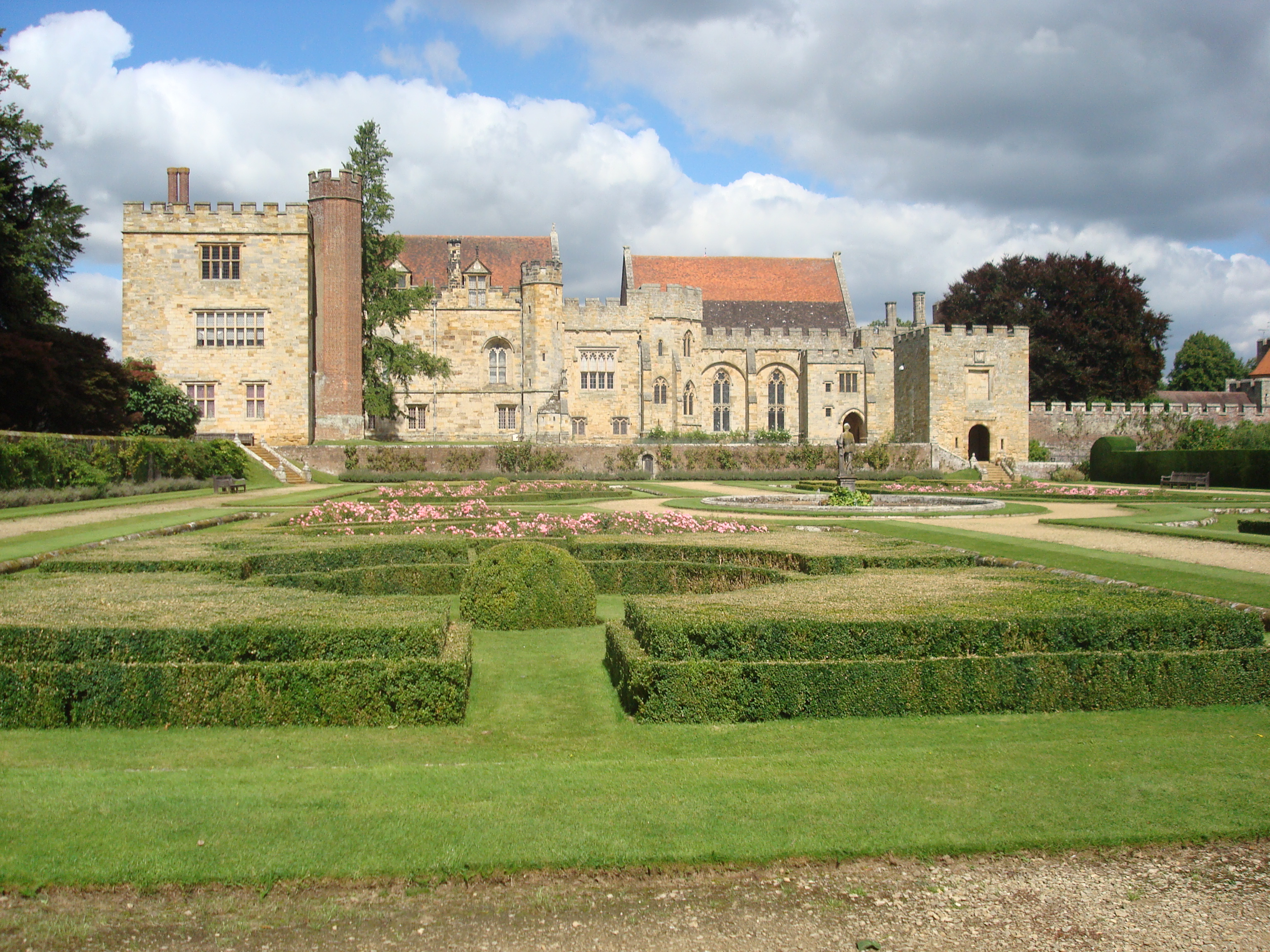
Penshurst Place

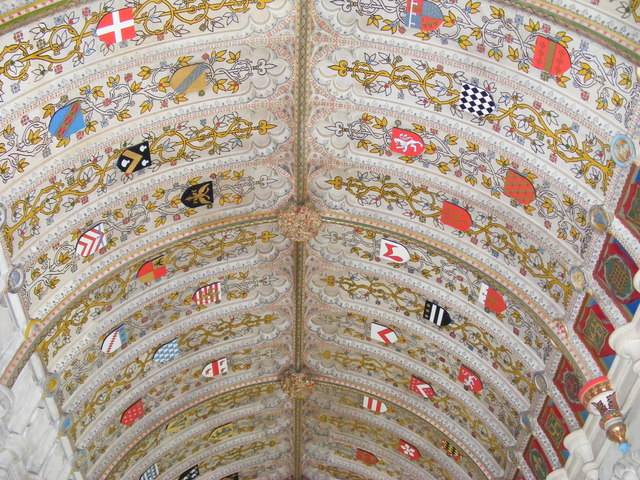
Ceiling of the Sidney Chapel at St John the Baptist, Penshurst

The family seat is Penshurst Place, near Tonbridge, Kent. Close to it is the parish church of St John the Baptist, where the Sidney Chapel houses many memorials to the family.

== Shelley-Sidney baronets, of Penshurst Place (1818) ==
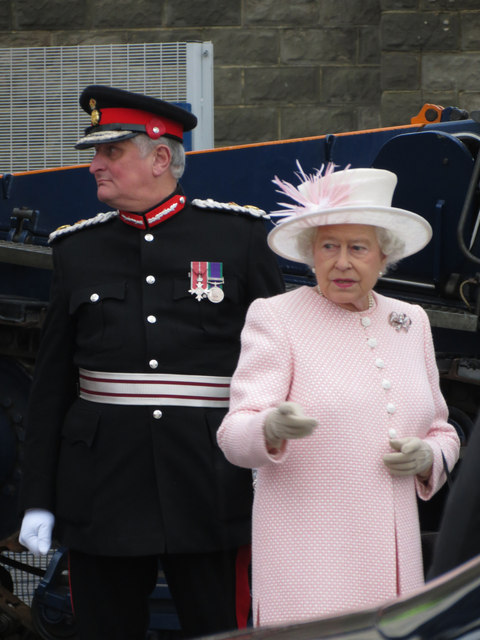
The 2nd Viscount De L'Isle, as Lord-Lieutenant of Kent, with the Queen in 2011

- Sir John Shelley-Sidney, 1st Baronet (1771–1849)
- Sir Philip Charles Sidney, 2nd Baronet (1800–1851) (created Baron De L'Isle and Dudley in 1835)

=== Baron De L'Isle and Dudley (1835) ===
- Philip Charles Sidney, 1st Baron De L'Isle and Dudley (1800–1851)
- Philip Sidney, 2nd Baron De L'Isle and Dudley (1828–1898)
- Philip Sidney, 3rd Baron De L'Isle and Dudley (1853–1922)
- Algernon Sidney, 4th Baron De L'Isle and Dudley (1854–1945)
- William Sidney, 5th Baron De L'Isle and Dudley (1859–1945)
- William Philip Sidney, 6th Baron De L'Isle and Dudley (1909–1991) (created Viscount De L'Isle in 1956)

=== Viscount De L'Isle (1956) ===
- William Philip Sidney, 1st Viscount De L'Isle (1909–1991) (succeeded to the Shelley baronetcy of Castle Goring in 1965)
- Philip John Algernon Sidney, 2nd Viscount De L'Isle (born 1945)

The heir apparent is the present holder's only son, the Hon. Philip William Edmund Sidney (born 1985).

=== Title succession chart ===
Title succession chart, Viscounts De L'Isle, Barons De L'Isle and Dudley, and Shelley/Shelley-Sidney/Shelley-Rolls/Sidney baronets (1806 and 1818 creations).

Shelley baronets of Castle Goring, 1806
Bysshe Shelley; 1731–1815; 1st Baronet
Shelley-Sidney baronets of Penshurst Place
Timothy Shelley; 1753–1844; 2nd Baronet	Maj. Robert Shelley d. 1849	John Shelley-Sidney; 1771–1849; 1st Baronet
Baron De L'Isle and Dudley
Percy Bysshe Shelley; 1792–1822	John Shelley; 1806–1866	Philip Sidney; 1800–1851; 1st Baron De L'Isle and Dudley, 2nd Baronet
Charles Shelley; 1814–1826	William Shelley; 1816–1819	Percy Shelley; 1819–1889; 3rd Baronet	Edward Shelley; 1827–1890; 4th Baronet	Charles Shelley; 1838–1902; 5th Baronet	Philip Sidney; 1828–1898; 2nd Baron De L'Isle and Dudley
John Shelley-Rolls; 1871–1951; 6th Baronet	Percy Shelley; 1872–1953; 7th Baronet	Lt. Cecil Shelley; 1873–1915	Sidney Shelley; 1880–1965; 8th Baronet	Hubert Shelley; 1881–1951	Philip Sidney; 1853–1922; 3rd Baron De L'Isle and Dudley	Algernon Sidney; 1854–1945	Henry Sidney; 1858–1896; 4th Baron De L'Isle and Dudley	William Sidney; 1859–1945; 5th Baron De L'Isle and Dudley, 6th Baronet
Baronetcy inherited by the 1st Viscount De L'Isle
Viscount De L'Isle
William Sidney; 1909–1991; 1st Viscount De L'Isle, 6th Baron De L'Isle and Dudley, 9th Baronet, 7th Baronet
Philip Sidney b. 1945; 2nd Viscount De L'Isle
Philip Sidney b. 1985

=== Line of succession ===
Line of succession (limited to the descendants of the 1st Baron De L'Isle and Dudley)
- Philip Charles Sidney, 1st Baron De L'Isle and Dudley (1800–1851)
  - Philip Sidney, 2nd Baron De L'Isle and Dudley (1828–1898)
    - Philip Sidney, 3rd Baron De L'Isle and Dudley (1853–1922)
    - Algernon Sidney, 4th Baron De L'Isle and Dudley (1854–1945)
    - William Sidney, 5th Baron De L'Isle and Dudley (1859–1945)
      - William Philip Sidney, 6th Baron De L'Isle and Dudley, 1st Viscount De L'Isle (1909–1991)
        - Philip John Algernon Sidney, 7th Baron De L'Isle and Dudley, 2nd Viscount De L'Isle (born 1945)
          - (1) The Hon. Philip William Edmund Sidney (born 1985)

== See also ==
- Shelley baronets, of Castle Goring
- Earl of Leicester (1563 and 1618 creations)
- Duke of Northumberland (1551 creation)
- Viscount Lisle
- Baron Lisle

Baronetage of the United Kingdom
Preceded by Lacon baronets	Shelley-Sidney baronets of Penshurst Place; 12 December 1818	Succeeded by Hare baronets
