= Shelley baronets of Castle Goring (1806) =

Baronetcy

Escutcheon of the Shelley baronets of Castle Goring

The Shelley baronetcy, of Castle Goring in the County of Sussex, was created in the Baronetage of the United Kingdom on 3 March 1806 for Bysshe Shelley (1731–1815). Sir Bysshe was succeeded by his eldest son, Timothy, from his first marriage. Sir Timothy's eldest son and heir apparent was the poet Percy Bysshe Shelley, who predeceased his father, leaving two sons: Charles Bysshe Shelley by his first wife Harriet Westbrook, and Percy Florence Shelley, Shelley's son from his second marriage to the author Mary Shelley. The elder son, Charles, died young, so upon the death of Sir Timothy, the younger son, Percy, became the third Baronet. He died childless and the title passed to his first cousin, Edward Shelley, who then became the fourth Baronet.

Sir Bysshe Shelley had one son from his second marriage, John Shelley. His name was changed to Shelley-Sidney in 1795. He was created a Baronet, of Penshurst Place, in 1818. For this title, see the Viscount De L'Isle article.

Sir Edward Shelley, 4th Baronet, was the son of John Shelley, the second son of Sir Timothy. On his death in 1890 the title passed to his younger brother, Lt.-Col. Sir Charles Shelley, the fifth Baronet. He was succeeded by his son, Sir John Courtown Edward Shelley-Rolls, the sixth Baronet. Sir John married the Hon. Eleanor Georgiana Rolls, daughter of the 1st Baron Llangattock, and in 1917 they assumed the additional surname and arms of Rolls. When he died the title passed to his younger brother, Sir Percy Bysshe Shelley, the seventh Baronet. On Sir Percy's death in 1965 this line of the family failed and the baronetcy was inherited by the late Baronet's kinsman, William Sidney, 1st Viscount De L'Isle, who became the 9th Baronet of Castle Goring as well.

== Shelley baronets, of Castle Goring (1806) ==
- Sir Bysshe Shelley, 1st Baronet (1731–1815)
- Sir Timothy Shelley, 2nd Baronet (1753–1844)
  - Percy Bysshe Shelley (1792–1822)
- Sir Percy Florence Shelley, 3rd Baronet (1819–1889)
- Sir Edward Shelley, 4th Baronet (1827–1890)
- Sir Charles Shelley, 5th Baronet (1838–1902)
- Sir John Courtown Edward Shelley-Rolls, 6th Baronet (1871–1951)
- Sir Percy Bysshe Shelley, 7th Baronet (1872–1953)
- Sir Sidney Patrick Shelley, 8th Baronet (1880–1965). His heir was the 1st Viscount De L'Isle (next).
- William Sidney, 1st Viscount De L'Isle, 6th Baron De L'Isle and Dudley, 7th Baronet of Penshurst Place and 9th Baronet of Castle Goring (1909–1991), descended from the third son of the first baronet. See Viscount De L'Isle for further holders.

=== Title succession chart ===
Title succession chart, Viscounts De L'Isle, Barons De L'Isle and Dudley, and Shelley/Shelley-Sidney/Shelley-Rolls/Sidney baronets (1806 and 1818 creations).

Shelley baronets of Castle Goring
Sir Bysshe Shelley; 1st Baronet; 1731–1815
Shelley-Sidney baronets of Penshurst Place
Sir Timothy Shelley; 2nd Baronet; 1753–1844	Maj. Robert Shelley died 1849	Sir John Shelley-Sidney; 1st Baronet; 1771–1849
Baron De L'Isle and Dudley
Percy Bysshe Shelley; 1792–1822	John Shelley; 1806–1866	Philip Sidney; 1st Baron De L'Isle and Dudley; 2nd Baronet; 1800–1851
Charles Shelley; 1814–1826	William Shelley; 1816–1819	Sir Percy Shelley; 3rd Baronet; 1819–1889	Sir Edward Shelley; 4th Baronet; 1827–1890	Sir Charles Shelley; 5th Baronet; 1838–1902	Philip Sidney; 2nd Baron De L'Isle and Dudley; 1828–1898
Sir John Shelley-Rolls; 6th Baronet; 1871–1951	Sir Percy Shelley; 7th Baronet; 1872–1953	Lt. Cecil Shelley; 1873–1915	Sir Sidney Shelley; 8th Baronet; 1880–1965	Hubert Shelley; 1881–1951	Philip Sidney; 3rd Baron De L'Isle and Dudley; 1853–1922	Algernon Sidney; 4th Baron De L'Isle and Dudley; 1854–1945	Hon. Henry Sidney; 1858–1896	William Sidney; 5th Baron De L'Isle and Dudley; 6th Baronet; 1859–1945
Baronetcy inherited by the 1st Viscount De L'Isle
Viscount De L'Isle
William Sidney; 1st Viscount De L'Isle; 6th Baron De L'Isle and Dudley; 9th Baronet; 7th Baronet; 1909–1991
Philip Sidney; 2nd Viscount De L'Isle born 1945
Hon. Philip Sidney born 1985

== See also ==
- Viscount De L'Isle

== Notes ==
Baronetage of the United Kingdom
Preceded by Abney-Hastings baronets	Shelley baronets of Castle Goring; 3 March 1806	Succeeded by Cholmeley baronets
