= William Sidney (disambiguation) =

William Sidney, 1st Viscount De L'Isle (1909–1991), was the Governor-General of Australia.

William Sidney may refer to:

- William Sidney (MP for Sussex), MP for Sussex in 1429 and 1433
- Sir William Sidney (courtier) (1482?–1554), English courtier under Henry VIII and Edward VI
- William Sidney, 5th Baron De L'Isle and Dudley, candidate in the 1944 Chelsea by-election
- William Sydney Clements, 3rd Earl of Leitrim, an Anglo-Irish nobleman and landlord
