= William Sidney, 1st Viscount De L'Isle =

British Army officer and politician (1909–1991)

Major The Right Honourable The Viscount De L'Isle VC KG GCMG GCVO KStJ PC
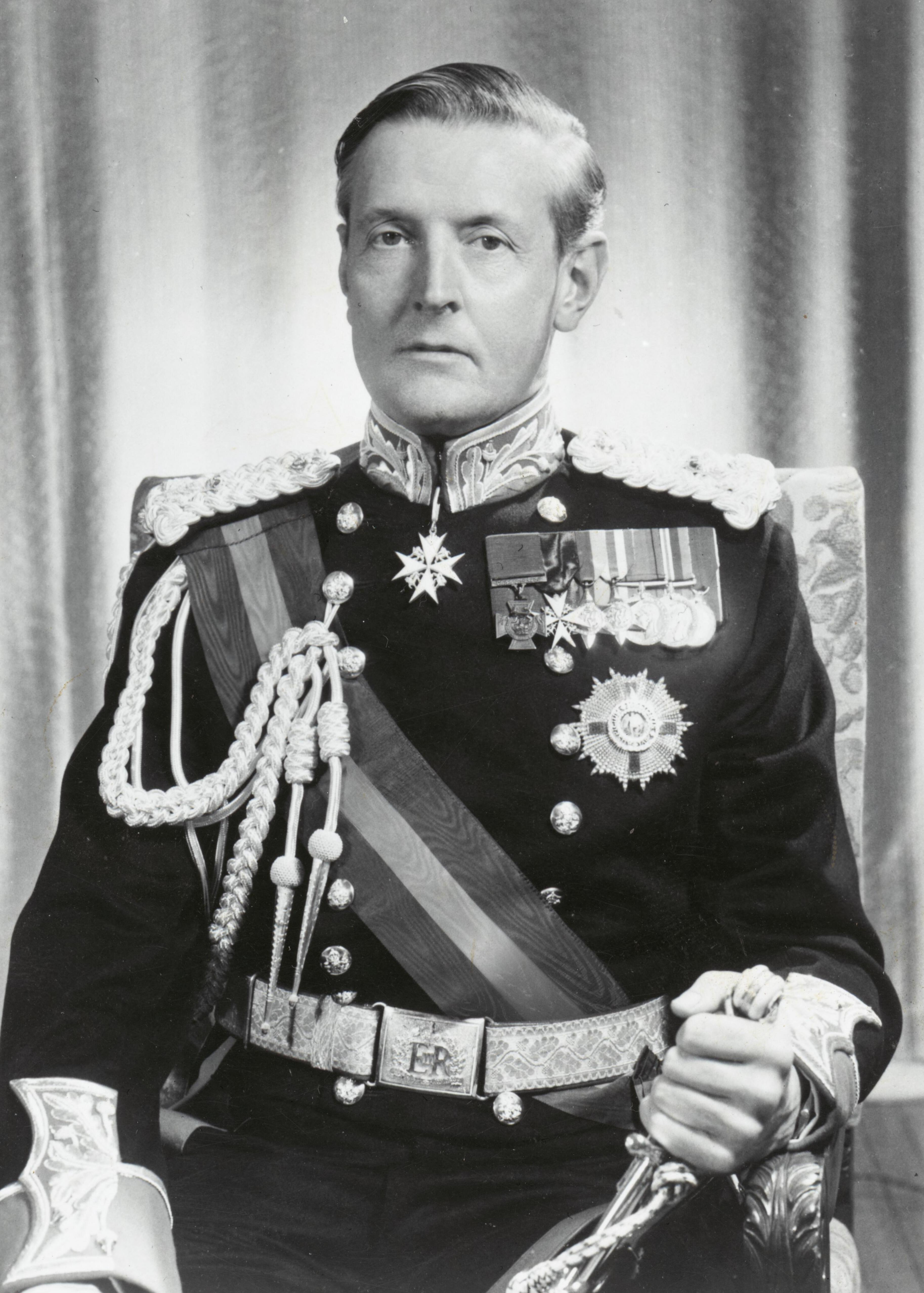
- Sidney in 1962

15th Governor-General of Australia
- In office 3 August 1961 – 7 May 1965
- Monarch: Elizabeth II
- Prime Minister: Robert Menzies
- Preceded by: The Viscount Dunrossil
- Succeeded by: The Lord Casey

Secretary of State for Air
- In office 31 October 1951 – 20 December 1955
- Monarchs: George VI; Elizabeth II
- Prime Minister: Winston Churchill
- Preceded by: Arthur Henderson
- Succeeded by: Nigel Birch

Member of Parliament for Chelsea
- In office 11 October 1944 – 15 June 1945
- Preceded by: Sir Samuel Hoare
- Succeeded by: Allan Noble

Member of the House of Lords
- Lord Temporal
- In office 18 June 1945 – 5 April 1991
- Preceded by: The 5th Baron De L'Isle and Dudley
- Succeeded by: The 2nd Viscount De L'Isle

Personal details
- Born: William Philip Sidney; 23 May 1909 Chelsea, London, England
- Died: 5 April 1991 (aged 81) Tonbridge, Kent, England
- Party: Conservative
- Spouses: Jacqueline Vereker (m. 1940; died 1962) Margaret Bailey, Baroness Glanusk (m. 1966)
- Children: 5, including Philip
- Relatives: 6th Viscount Gort (father-in-law)
- Education: Magdalene College, Cambridge

Military service
- Allegiance: United Kingdom
- Branch/service: British Army
- Years of service: 1929–1944
- Rank: Major
- Unit: Grenadier Guards
- Battles/wars: Second World War
- Awards: Victoria Cross

William Philip Sidney, 1st Viscount De L'Isle (23 May 1909 – 5 April 1991), known as Lord De L'Isle and Dudley between 1945 and 1956, was a British Army officer, politician and Victoria Cross recipient who served as the 15th governor-general of Australia, in office from 1961 to 1965. He was the last non-Australian to hold the position and the last British national to be appointed Governor-General of any Commonwealth realm.

Sidney was born into an aristocratic family and attended Eton College before going on to Magdalene College, Cambridge. He became a chartered accountant, but also joined the Territorial Army. During the Second World War, Sidney served with the Grenadier Guards in France and Italy; he was awarded the Victoria Cross in 1944 for his actions in the Battle of Anzio. He was elected to the House of Commons later that year, as a member of the Conservative Party.

In 1945, Sidney succeeded his father as Baron De L'Isle and Dudley, consequently being elevated to the House of Lords. He served as Secretary of State for Air from 1951 to 1955, under Winston Churchill, and was raised to the viscountcy in 1956. Lord De L'Isle became governor-general in 1961 on the recommendation of Robert Menzies, the Prime Minister of Australia. He served for just under four years with little controversy; as well as being the last British governor-general of Australia, he was also the last to wear the traditional vice-regal uniform.

== Early life and education ==
William Philip Sidney was the younger of two children, and the only son, of William Sidney, 5th Baron De L'Isle and Dudley (19 August 1859 – 18 June 1945), and his wife, Winifred Agneta Yorke Bevan (died 11 February 1959). He was a descendant of William IV by his mistress Dorothea Jordan.

He was educated at Eton College and Magdalene College, Cambridge. After leaving university he first became a chartered accountant, before joining the Grenadier Guards Supplementary Reserve of Officers in 1929.

== War service ==
During the Second World War, Sidney fought in the Battle of France and the Italian Campaign. While serving as a company commander in the 5th Battalion, Grenadier Guards (itself part of 24th Guards Brigade of the 1st Infantry Division), he led a handful of men in the defence of the Anzio beachhead in February 1944, for which he was awarded the Victoria Cross. Sidney led a successful attack which drove German troops of the 147th Grenadier Regiment out of a gully. Later he led another counter-attack and dashed forward, engaging the Germans with his tommy gun at point-blank range, forcing a withdrawal. When the attack was renewed, Sidney and one guardsman were wounded and another killed, but he would not consent to have his wounds dressed until the Germans had been beaten off and the battalion's position had been consolidated. During this time, although extremely weak from loss of blood, he continued to encourage and inspire his men.

In later life, when asked where he had been shot, he would jocularly respond that he was shot in Italy. This was to conceal that he had been shot in the buttocks. The ribbon for the medal was made from one of his father-in-law Lord Gort's uniforms and was awarded by General Sir Harold Alexander, commanding the Allied Armies in Italy, on 3 March 1944 in Italy.

== Political life ==
At a by-election in October 1944, he was elected unopposed to the House of Commons as Conservative Member of Parliament (MP) for Chelsea. He succeeded Samuel Hoare as the member for Chelsea; the vacancy had been created because Hoare had been elevated to the House of Lords.

His father died in June 1945 and he succeeded as 6th Baron De L'Isle and Dudley, requiring transition to the House of Lords. He thus retired from the House of Commons prior to the July 1945 general election.

In 1951 he was appointed Secretary of State for Air under Winston Churchill and held that office until 1955. During this time he visited Australia, travelling to Woomera to examine weapons research and meeting the Prime Minister, Robert Menzies. In 1956 he was created Viscount De L'Isle, of Penshurst in the County of Kent.

== Governor-General ==
Following the death in office of Lord Dunrossil in February 1961, Prime Minister Robert Menzies recommended De L'Isle as his military honours, aristocratic background, and political experience apparently made him, according to one author, Menzies' "vision of ideal governor-general material". De L'Isle was sworn in on 3 August 1961. He continued Dunrossil's revival of the full ceremonial vice-regal uniform, but would be the last governor-general to do so. De L'Isle faced no constitutional issues during his time in office. The Official Secretary throughout his term was Murray Tyrrell.

De L'Isle was the first governor-general since William McKell (1947–1953) to have children living at Government House in Canberra, and this made him popular with the general public. However, his wife fell ill in his first year of office, and died on 16 November 1962, aged 48. Despite this, he chose to continue in office until the expiry of Dunrossil's original five-year term in 1965. Two of his daughters, Catherine and Anne, acted as the official hostesses in place of their mother.

On 15 March 1963, De L'Isle signed the proclamation that revoked 140 mi (230 km) of the Gove Peninsula that was previously part of an Aboriginal reserve created for Yolngu people in Arnhem Land in 1931, to allow for bauxite mining, "acting with the advice of the Federal Executive Council". This led to the Yirrkala bark petitions, which was the first native title claim in Australia.

== Retirement and death ==
By the time of his retirement in 1965, public opinion was strongly in favour of an Australian Governor-General, although this was not a reflection on his performance in the role. His continuing interest in Australia was shown by several visits after his retirement, the last for Australia's bicentenary in 1988 when he presented a bronze statue, which now stands in the grounds of Government House in Canberra.

In 1975 he co-founded what is now called The Freedom Association, a free-market campaign group opposed to the post-war consensus that played a prominent role in the Grunwick Dispute.

Viscount De L'Isle died in Kent on 5 April 1991 and was buried in the Sidney family vault at St John the Baptist, Penshurst. He was the last surviving Victoria Cross recipient who had been a member of both Houses of Parliament. (Note: The last VC holder to sit in the Commons had been Sir John Smyth, who retired before the 1966 general election and died 1983.) He was succeeded in his titles by his only son, Philip.

== Styles and honours ==
- The Honourable William Sidney (23 May 1909 – 30 March 1944)
- The Honourable William Sidney VC (30 March 1944 – 11 October 1944)
- The Honourable William Sidney VC MP (11 October 1944 – 18 June 1945)
- The Right Honourable The Lord De L'Isle and Dudley VC (18 June 1945 – 1951)
- The Right Honourable The Lord De L'Isle and Dudley VC PC (1951 – 13 January 1956)
- The Right Honourable The Viscount De L'Isle VC PC (13 January 1956 – 11 May 1961)
- The Right Honourable The Viscount De L'Isle VC GCMG PC (11 May 1961 – 14 March 1963)
- The Right Honourable The Viscount De L'Isle VC GCMG GCVO PC (14 March 1963 – 23 April 1968)
- The Right Honourable The Viscount De L'Isle VC KG GCMG GCVO PC (23 April 1968 – 5 April 1991)

In 1965 De L'Isle succeeded his kinsman Sir Sidney Shelley in the baronetcy of Castle Goring.

He was appointed a Knight Companion of the Order of the Garter (KG) on 23 April 1968, becoming one of only two men ever to have held both the highest orders of gallantry and chivalry – the Victoria Cross and the Order of the Garter (the other being Field Marshal the Lord Roberts).

== Arms ==
Coat of arms of William Sidney, 1st Viscount De L'Isle, VC, KG, GCMG, GCVO, KStJ, PC
Coronet A Viscount's Coronet Crest 1st, a porcupine statant azure, quills, collar, and chain or; 2nd, a griffin's head erased argent, ducally gorged or. Escutcheon Quarterly: 1st and 4th or, a pheon azure, Sidney; 2nd and 3rd sable, one a fesse engrailed, between three whelk shells or, a mullet for difference, Shelley. Supporters Dexter, a porcupine azure, quills, collar, and chain or; sinister, a lion queue fourchée vert. Motto QUO FATA VOCANT Orders Behind the arms, the badge of Saint John, badge of a Baronet, Circlet of a Knight of the Order of the Garter, the Victoria Cross, insignia of a Knight Grand Cross of the Order of St Michael and St George, Knight Grand Cross of the Royal Victorian Order, and Knight of Justice of the Order of Saint John

== Personal life ==
Lord De L'Isle married Hon. Jacqueline Corrine Yvonne Vereker (20 October 1914 – 15 November 1962), daughter of Field Marshal John Vereker, 6th Viscount Gort, on 8 June 1940. The couple had five children:

- Hon. Elizabeth Sophia (born 12 March 1941, died 3 February 2016), married five times: to George Silver Oliver Annesley Colthurst, to Sir Humphry Wakefield, 2nd Baronet, to Captain James Silvester Rattray of Craighall-Rattray, 28th of Rattray, to Andrew H. Lane Paneyko, and to Robert Samuel Clive Abel Smith.
- Hon. Catherine Mary (born 20 October 1942, died 19 December 2021), married to Martin John Wilbraham, and then to Nicholas Hyde Villiers.
- Philip John Algernon, 2nd Viscount De L'Isle (born 21 April 1945)
- Hon. Anne Marjorie (born 15 August 1947), married to Lt.-Cdr. David Alexander Harries.
- Hon. Lucy Corinna Agneta (born 21 February 1953), married to Michael Willoughby, 13th Baron Middleton

After his wife's death, he married the widowed Lady Glanusk (née Margaret Shoubridge) on 24 March 1966 in Paris. They had no children.

== Ancestry ==
Viscount De L'Isle was a descendant of King William IV through his illegitimate daughter Lady Sophia FitzClarence. His ancestors also includes the Dukes of Leinster through two of his great-great-grandmothers, who were daughters of the 2nd Duke of Leinster.

Ancestors of William Sidney, 1st Viscount De L'Isle

Sir John Shelley-Sidney, 1st Baronet
Philip Sidney, 1st Baron De L'Isle and Dudley
Henrietta Hunloke
Philip Sidney, 2nd Baron De L'Isle and Dudley
William IV
Lady Sophia FitzClarence
Dorothea Bland
William Sidney, 5th Baron De L'Isle and Dudley
Sir William Foulis, 7th Baronet
Sir William Foulis, 8th Baronet
Mary Anne Turnor
Mary Foulis
Sir Charles Lockhart-Ross, 7th Baronet
Mary Jane Ross
Lady Mary Rebecca Fitzgerald
William Sidney, 1st Viscount De L'Isle
David Bevan
Robert Cooper Lee Bevan
Roland Yorke Bevan
Admiral Sir Joseph Sydney Yorke
Agneta Elizabeth Yorke
Elizabeth Weake Rattray
Winifred Agneta Yorke Bevan
Charles Kinnaird, 8th Lord Kinnaird
Arthur Kinnaird, 10th Lord Kinnaird
Lady Olivia Letitia Catherine FitzGerald
Hon. Agneta Olivia Kinnaird
William Henry Hoare
Mary Jane Hoare
Louisa Elizabeth Noel

== See also ==
- List of United Kingdom MPs with the shortest service

== Bibliography ==
- Ingleton, Roy (2011). Kent VCs. Pen and Sword Books. ISBN 978-1848844094.

Parliament of the United Kingdom
Preceded by Sir Samuel Hoare	Member of Parliament for Chelsea; 1944–1945	Succeeded by Allan Noble
Political offices
Preceded by Wilfred Paling	Parliamentary Secretary to the Minister for Pensions; 1945	Succeeded by Jennie Adamson
Preceded by Arthur Henderson	Secretary of State for Air; 1951–1955	Succeeded by Nigel Birch
Government offices
Preceded by The Viscount Dunrossil	Governor-General of Australia; 1961–1965	Succeeded by The Lord Casey
Peerage of the United Kingdom
New creation	Viscount De L'Isle; 1956–1991	Succeeded by Philip Sidney
Preceded by William Sidney	Baron De L'Isle and Dudley; 1945–1991; Member of the House of Lords (1945–1991)	Succeeded by Philip Sidney
Baronetage of the United Kingdom
Preceded by William Sidney	Baronet of Penshurst Place; 1945–1991	Succeeded by Philip Sidney
Preceded by Sir Sidney Shelley	Baronet of Castle Goring; 1965–1991	Succeeded by Philip Sidney
