= Charles Shelley =

Charles Shelley may refer to:

- Charles M. Shelley (1833–1907), Confederate States Army general and U.S. Representative from Alabama
- Sir Charles Shelley, 5th Baronet (1838–1902), British Army officer and landowner
- Charles Lee Shelley (born 1956), American fencer
