= 1944 Chelsea by-election =

UK parliamentary by-election

The 1944 Chelsea by-election was a by-election held on 11 October 1944 for the British House of Commons constituency of Chelsea in London.

The by-election was caused by the elevation of the constituency's Conservative Party Member of Parliament (MP) Sir Samuel Hoare to the peerage as Viscount Templewood. Hoare had held the seat since the January 1910 general election.

The Conservative candidate, William Sidney, was returned unopposed. Sidney held the seat until he succeeded his father as Baron de L'Isle and Dudley, leaving the seat vacant at the dissolution for the 1945 general election.

== See also ==
- List of United Kingdom by-elections
- Chelsea constituency
