= Stephen de Pencester =

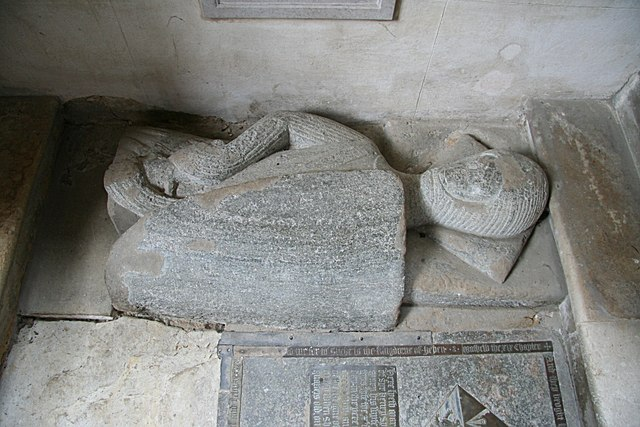
Memorial to Stephen de Pencester at St John the Baptist, Penshurst

Stephen de Pencester was Warden of the Cinque Ports when the first authoritative list of Cinque Ports Confederation Members was produced in 1293.

Pencester was Lord Warden of the Cinque Ports for 32 years, his tenure finishing in 1299 when the Baron de Burghersh was elected; it is reasonable to assume he began his administration in 1267.

Pencester was married to Margerie (a great-granddaughter of Hubert de Burgh, Earl of Kent). They resided both at Allington and Penshurst.

When Pencester died in 1303, Margerie then married to Robert de Orreby. After her death, an inquest found that she had inherited the parish of Tunstall in Kent and this parish passed to her daughters (of Pencester): Joane, the wife of Henry de Cobham, of Rundale, and Alice, wife of John de Columbers.

An effigy of Pencester is on display in Penshurst village's St John the Baptist church, in the Sidney family chapel, and the Pencester-owned Penshurst Place estate before the Baron's Hall was built by the new owner of the estate, Sir John de Pulteney in 1341.

| Preceded by Sir Matthew de Bezille | Lord Warden of the Cinque Ports; 1267–1299 | Succeeded by The Lord Burghersh |
