= Sir Sidney Shelley, 8th Baronet =

Sir Sidney Patrick Shelley Bt
- Born: 18 January 1880
- Died: 25 July 1965 (aged 85)
- Title: 8th Baronet of Castle Goring
- Parent(s): Lt.-Col. Sir Charles Shelley, 5th Bt. Lady Mary Stopford

Sir Sidney Patrick Shelley, 8th Baronet (18 January 1880 – 25 July 1965), was an English professional soldier.

A great-nephew of the poet Percy Bysshe Shelley, Shelley was born to Lt. Col. Sir Charles Shelley, 5th Baronet, and Lady Mary Jane Jemima Shelley (née Stopford), daughter of James Stopford, 5th Earl of Courtown. He was educated at Wellington College. As a soldier he served in the Second Boer War, and in World War I as Captain in the Hampshire Yeomanry.

Baronetage of the United Kingdom
Preceded by Percy Shelley	Baronet of Castle Goring; 1953–1965	Succeeded by William Sidney
