= Sophia Sidney, Baroness De L'Isle and Dudley =

British baroness (1796–1837)

The Right Honourable The Lady De L'Isle and Dudley
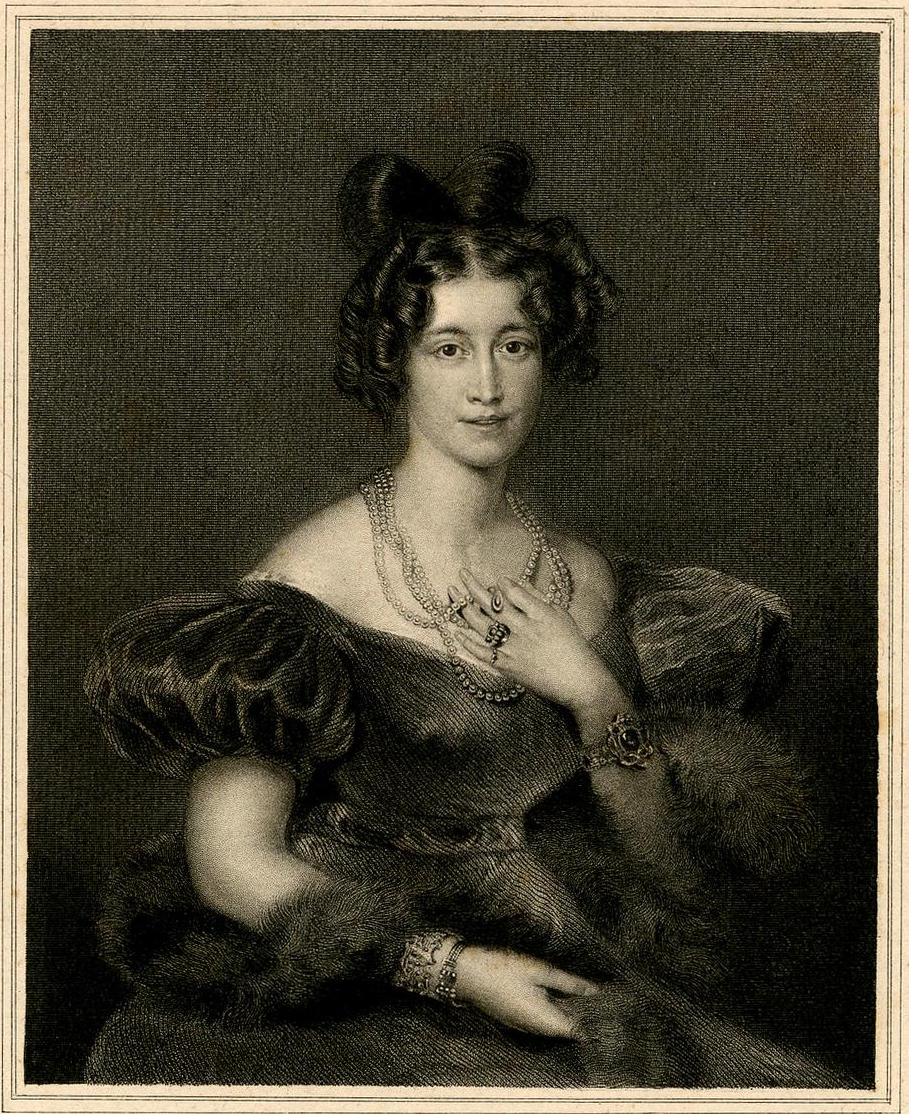
- Lady De L'Isle and Dudley in 1832
- Born: Sophia FitzClarence; 25 August 1796; Somerset Street, London, England
- Died: 10 April 1837 (aged 40); Kensington Palace, London, England
- Noble family: FitzClarence
- Spouse: Philip Sidney, 1st Baron De L'Isle and Dudley (m. 1825)
- Issue: Adelaide Sidney; Philip Sidney; Ernestine Sidney; Sophia Sidney
- Father: William IV
- Mother: Dorothea Jordan
- Occupation: State Housekeeper

Sophia Sidney, Baroness De L'Isle and Dudley (née FitzClarence; 25 August 1796 – 10 April 1837), was the eldest illegitimate daughter of William IV of the United Kingdom and his longtime mistress Dorothea Jordan. She was married to Philip Sidney, 1st Baron De L'Isle and Dudley, and had four surviving children. Shortly before her death in 1837, she served as State Housekeeper in Kensington Palace.

== Family and early life ==
Sophia FitzClarence was born on 25 August 1796 on Somerset Street in London, the eldest daughter of Prince William, Duke of Clarence and St Andrews, by his longtime mistress, the comic actress Dorothea Jordan. Sophia would come to have nine siblings, five brothers and four sisters, all surnamed FitzClarence. While circumstances prevented the couple from ever marrying, for twenty years William and Dorothea enjoyed domestic stability and were devoted to their children. In 1797, they moved from Clarence Lodge to Bushy House, residing at the Teddington residence until 1807. The couple separated in 1811 as William sought to produce legitimate issue.

== Marriage and issue ==
On 13 August 1825, Sophia married Philip Sidney, later an M.P. and the 1st Baron De L'Isle and Dudley of Penshurst in the County of Kent. Sidney was a relation of the Romantic poet and philosopher Percy Bysshe Shelley, though he had opted to drop "Shelley" from his surname.

Sophia and her husband had four surviving children, three daughters and a son:

- Adelaide Augusta Wilhelmina Sidney (1 June 1826 – 20 September 1904), married her first cousin, Frederick Charles George FitzClarence-Hunloke, son of George FitzClarence, 1st Earl of Munster, no issue
- Philip Sidney, 2nd Baron De L'Isle and Dudley (28 January 1828 – 17 February 1898), grandfather of the 1st Viscount De L'Isle
- Ernestine Wellington Sidney (9 January 1834 – 20 September 1910), married Philip Perceval; mother of Major Sir Philip Hunloke, who was the father of Lt.-Col. Henry Hunloke
- Sophia Philippa Sidney (11 March 1837 – 12 May 1907), married Alexander, Graf von Kielmannsegg, a great-grandson of Johann Ludwig, Reichsgraf von Wallmoden-Gimborn (alleged illegitimate son of George II of Great Britain)

== Later life ==
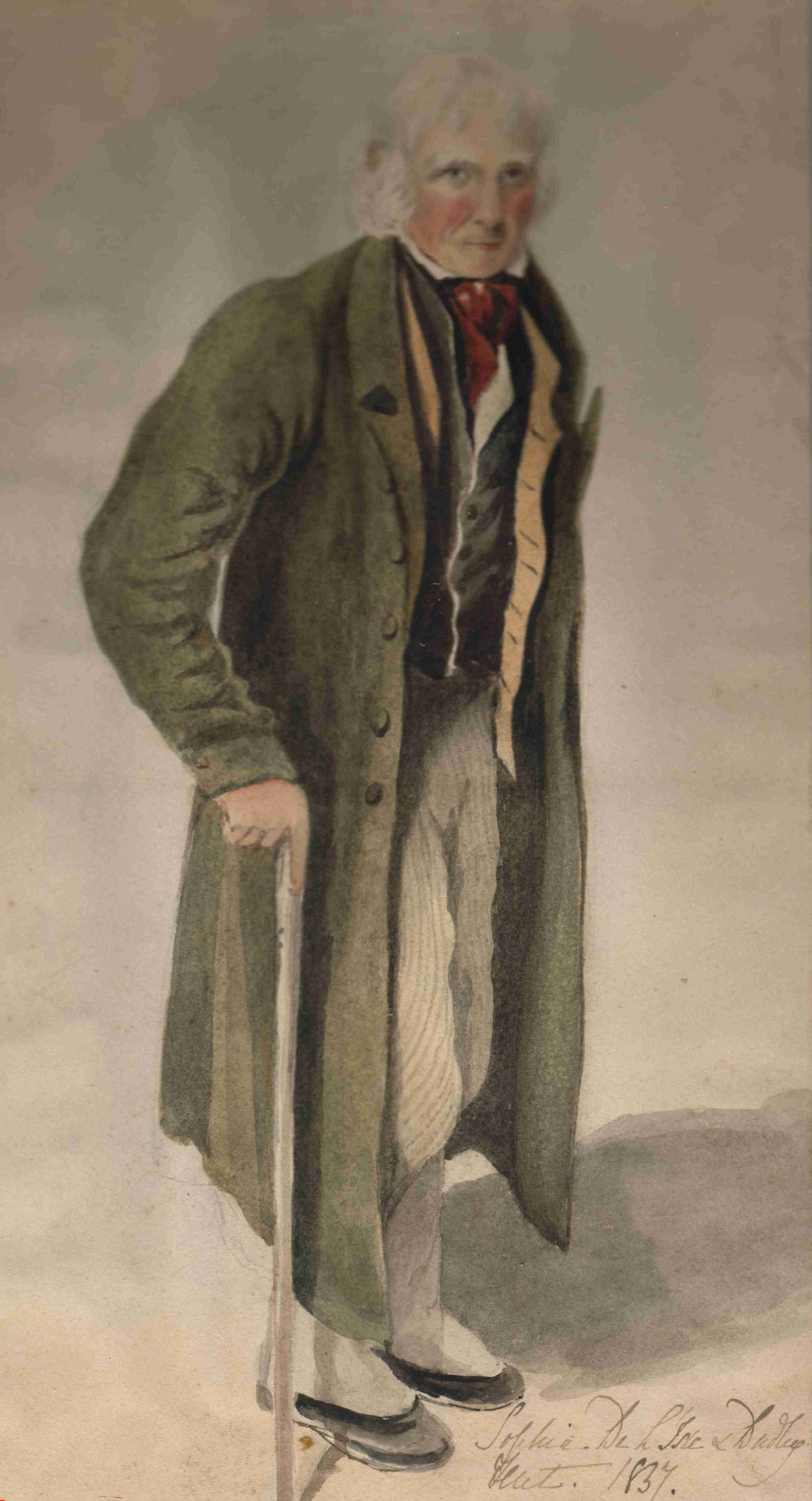
William IV drawn by his daughter Sophia in 1837

In May 1831 Sophia, like her sisters, was raised to the status of a daughter of a marquess. In January 1837, she was appointed State Housekeeper of Kensington Palace, where she died three months later. Sophia died in childbirth just after drawing a sketch of her ailing father. She was his favourite child and her death caused him intense grief, exacerbated by the fact that he was completely estranged from her brother, the Earl of Munster. She was remembered as a woman of great wit, charm and gaiety. There is a memorial to her at St John the Baptist, Penshurst; she is interred in the Sidney family vault therein.

The widowed Sidney died in 1851.

== Ancestry ==
Ancestors of Sophia Sidney, Baroness De L'Isle and Dudley

16. George II of Great Britain
8. Frederick, Prince of Wales
17. Caroline of Brandenburg-Ansbach
4. George III of the United Kingdom
18. Frederick II, Duke of Saxe-Gotha-Altenburg
9. Princess Augusta of Saxe-Gotha
19. Magdalena Augusta of Anhalt-Zerbst
2. William IV
20. Adolf Frederick II, Duke of Mecklenburg-Strelitz
10. Duke Charles Louis Frederick of Mecklenburg
21. Princess Christiane Emilie of Schwarzburg-Sondershausen
5. Charlotte of Mecklenburg-Strelitz
22. Ernest Frederick I, Duke of Saxe-Hildburghausen
11. Princess Elisabeth Albertine of Saxe-Hildburghausen
23. Countess Sophia Albertine of Erbach-Erbach
1. Sophia Sidney, Baroness De L'Isle and Dudley
24. James Bland
12. Nathaniel Bland
25. Lucy Brewster
6. Francis Bland
13. Elizabeth Heaton
3. Dorothy Jordan
7. Grace Phillips
