= Sir Bysshe Shelley, 1st Baronet =

Paternal grandfather of P.B Shelley

Sir Bysshe Shelley, 1st Baronet (21 June 1731 – 6 January 1815), was the grandfather of English Romantic poet Percy Bysshe Shelley.

== Life ==
Shelley was born in Newark, Essex County, Province of New Jersey (present-day United States), on 21 June 1731. He became rich and influential due to a combination of marriages to women from other influential families and his own family's wealth. In the 1790s, following the death of his second wife, he built a magnificent country house, Castle Goring, which he intended to be the family seat. He was made a baronet in 1806. He died in 1815 at the age of 83.

== Personal life ==
Sir Bysshe was married twice; first on 30 June 1752 to Mary Catherine Michell (b. 1734 in Sussex, England), the daughter of Theobald and Mary Michell; and secondly to Elizabeth Jane Perry on 17 August 1769.

Child from first marriage:

- Timothy Shelley (7 September 1753 – 24 April 1844); later Sir Timothy Shelley, 2nd Baronet

Child from second marriage:

- John Shelley (18 December 1771 – 14 March 1849); later Sir John Shelley-Sidney, 1st Baronet Shelley-Sidney of Penshurst Place
- Algernon Bysshe Shelley (May 1781 – December 1781)

== Ancestry ==
Henry Shelley became father to the younger Henry Shelley. This younger Henry had at least three sons. The youngest of them, Richard Shelley, was born in 1583, and baptized 17 November 1583 in Warminghurst, Sussex, England. Richard later married on 3 February 1601 in Itchingfield to Jonne (aka Joane) Feste/Feest/Fuste, daughter of John Feest/Fuste from Itchingfield, near Horsham, West Sussex. Their grandson, John Shelley of Fen Place, Turners Hill, West Sussex, was married to Helen Bysshe, daughter of Roger Bysshe. Their son Timothy Shelley of Fen Place (born c. 1700) married widow Johanna Plum from New York City. Timothy and Johanna were the great-grandparents of Percy.

== Ancestry chart ==
Sir Bysshe Shelley, 1st Baronet of Castle Goring

16. Richard Shelley (born 1583)
8. Mr. Shelley
17. Joan Fuste
4. John Shelley of Fen Place
2. Timothy Shelley of Fen Place (born c. 1700)
10. Roger Bysshe of Fen Place
5. Helen Bysshe
1. Sir Bysshe Shelley
3. Johanna Plum

Baronetage of the United Kingdom
New creation	Baronet of Castle Goring; 1806–1815	Succeeded by Timothy Shelley
