= St John the Baptist, Penshurst =

Coordinates: 51°10′25″N 0°11′00″E

- Church of St John the Baptist
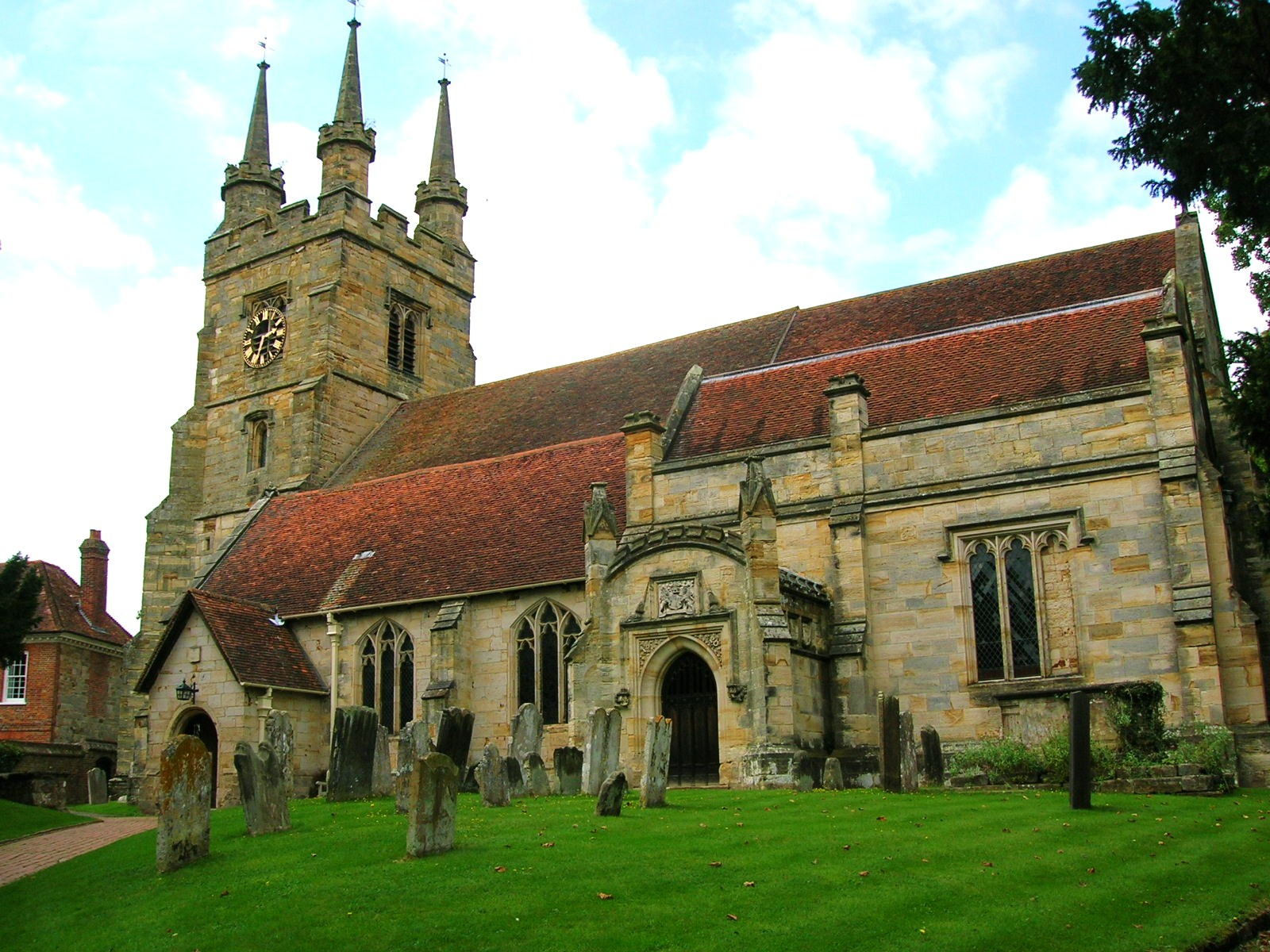
- St. John the Baptist, Penshurst
- St John the Baptist, Penshurst
- OS grid reference: TQ 52732 43859
- Country: England
- Denomination: Church of England
- Previous denomination: Roman Catholic
- Website: penshurstchurch.org

History
- Status: Parish Church

Architecture
- Functional status: Active
- Heritage designation: Grade I
- Designated: 24 October 1950
- Architect: Various
- Years built: -1115
- Completed: 1115

Administration
- Province: Canterbury
- Diocese: Rochester

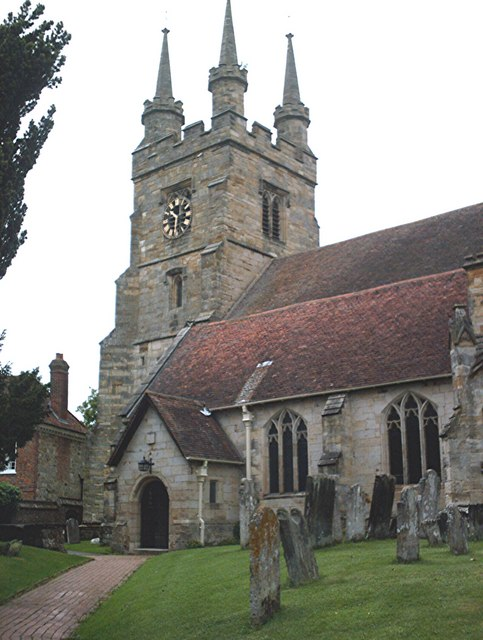
St. John the Baptist, Penshurst

St John the Baptist Church at Penshurst in Kent is a Grade I listed Anglican parish church in the Diocese of Rochester in England. Those buried or commemorated here include Knights, Earls, Viscounts, a Viceroy of India, a Governor-General of Australia, a Private Secretary to two Kings, two Field Marshals and two winners of the Victoria Cross. Through its courtiers, soldiers, statesmen, politicians or priests whose lives appear on memorials or through its changing architecture, brasses, carvings, effigies and windows, the church helps tell a country's story through the eyes of single village.

== History ==
A church has stood on the present site in Penshurst since 1115, at the centre of a cluster of buildings, including the manor house, guild house and rectory. The church of 1115 is mentioned in the Textus Roffensis. There may have been a church on the site since Saxon times, as suggested by the recent discovery of artefacts dating from 860 AD on adjoining land. Penshurst's first priest, Wilhelmus, was installed in 1170 by Archbishop Thomas Becket, his last public act before he was assassinated two days later in Canterbury Cathedral. The core of the nave as it appears today may be of that date.

The North aisle was added c.1200, and the South-Eastern chapel is 13th century in origin. The South aisle and South chapel arcade were built or rebuilt in the 14th century, and the North-Eastern chapel was also in existence by the mid-14th century. The nave and chancel walls were raised and provided with a clerestory in the 15th century, and the tower is also 15th century. The South aisle was widened and the South porch built in 1631. Before the restoration by George Gilbert Scott, the windows there were of 1631. The unusual corner turrets and pinnacles on the tower may also be 17th century .

The church was heavily restored and partially rebuilt in 1864–1865 by George Gilbert Scott. He rebuilt and enlarged the North aisle and North-Eastern chapel, replaced many of the roofs, and replaced the 17th century South aisle windows with pseudo-medieval windows felt to be more in keeping with the overall style of the church. There was further refurnishing in the late 19th century.

== Description ==
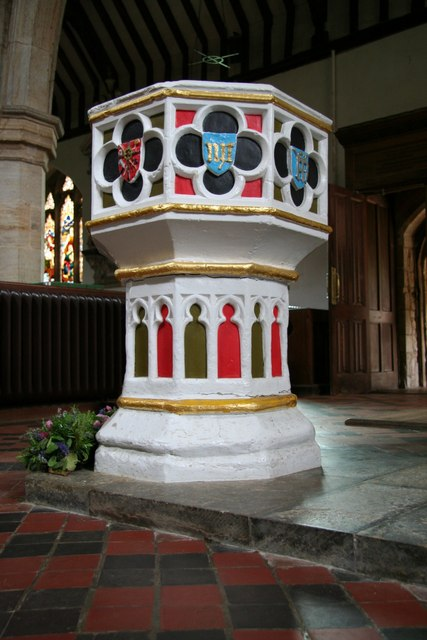
font

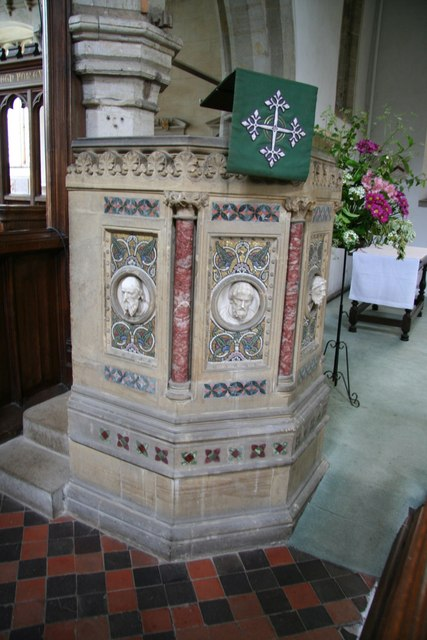
pulpit

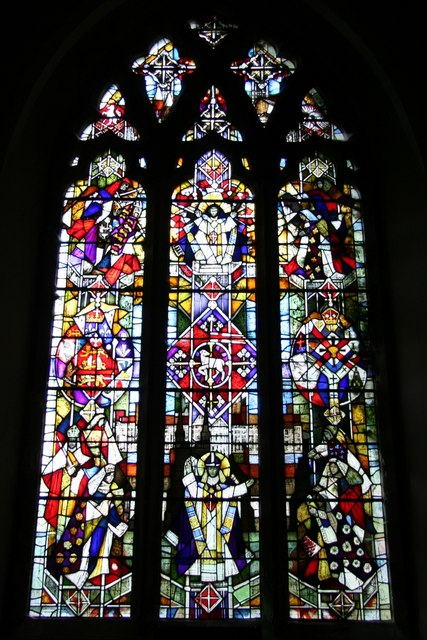
Wilhelmus window, commemorating Penshurst's first priest, who was installed in 1170 by Archbishop Thomas Becket

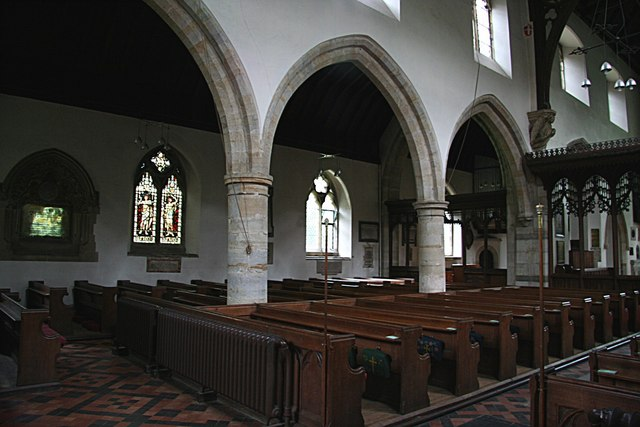
North arcade

St John the Baptist has a nave with North and South aisles and a South porch. The tower stands in the West. Side chapels are in the North-East, the South and the South-East. The latter is the "Sidney Chapel" (see below) which has its own porch and is directly connected with the church's chancel. The church is located set back from the street and in close proximity to Penshurst Place.

The church's exterior is built from coursed sandstone ashlar. Sections of the present building can be traced to almost each century between the 12th and 19th. The roof was raised in the 14th century, the base of the tower added in the 15th, the present southern aisle in the 17th, the top of the tower in the 18th century, the northern aisle in the 19th century and now the north-eastern extension in the 21st century.

On the interior, the church as no chancel arch, but a large timber arch of 1865–1866 which serves to divide nave and chancel. There are two arches of unequal width from the chancel to the North chapel, one with a hood mould with mid-14th-century headstops, the other almost plain and much taller, with a triangular, possibly 15th-century head. There is a 15th-century polygonal font with quatrefoils on the bowl and tracery on the stem, a stone pulpit of c.1865 in a hard Italianate style, with mosaic inlay and Roman-style carved heads. The chancel screen dates from 1895 and is by Bodley and Garner, in a very elaborate late Perpendicular style with delicate tracery and a coved loft. There is a similar screen in the North aisle. There is also some good heraldic glass of 1627 in the West window and glass of 1884 in the South clerestory by Holiday, as well as other good 19th century and early 20th century windows.

== Features ==
=== Chancel and Sanctuary ===
The Chancel, where the choir sits, and Sanctuary, behind the altar rail, incorporate 14th and later 19th century work. The later work by Giles Gilbert Scott consists of a lofty space with three bays set below a quasi barrel vault. Under the East window, behind the altar, is a wooden reredos in memory of Major Francis J Ball.

The Chancel screen was installed in 1897 as a memorial to The 1st Baron Hardinge of Penshurst, KG, GCB, GCSI, GCMG, GCIE, GCVO, ISO, PC (1858–1944), Viceroy of India from 1910 to 1916. A second screen commemorates other members of the Hardinge family who died during the 1st World War.

There is a wide collection of brasses and monuments with the Sanctuary dominated by memorials to previous rectors of the parish, the most notable of whom was Revd. Henry Hammond (1605–1660), who became Rector or Penshurst at the age of 28 and who went on to become Chaplain to King Charles I.

=== St Luke's Chapel ===
St Luke's Chapel, at the western end of the south aisle, was originally called the Side Chapel. It was rededicated by David Say, the Bishop of Rochester, in 1981 as St Luke's. The Luke Tapestry, which hangs above the altar, was designed and worked by a former village doctor, Dr A Wood, in memory of his father, Dr C Wood, who was Penshurst's doctor for more than 50 years. Dedicated to St Luke as the first Christian physician, it denotes the partnership between medical science and Christianity.

Between the windows on the south wall is a memorial to Sir William Coventry (c. 1628–1686) who was a member of the powerful Naval Board whom Samuel Pepys served as Secretary whilst keeping his famous diary. His memorial is a massive architectural wall tablet in black and white marble with putti holding up an urn, probably by William Kidwell.

=== Sidney Chapel ===
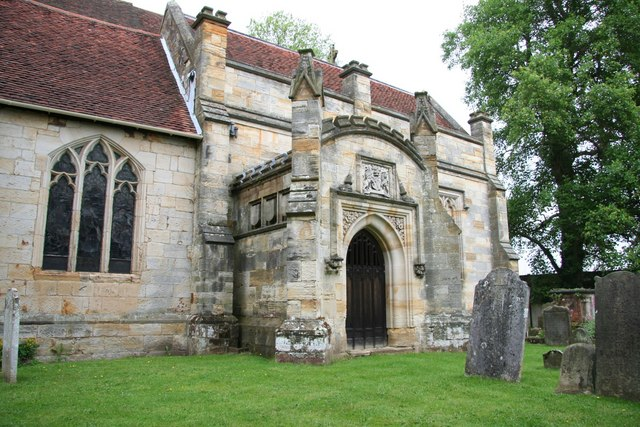
Sidney Chapel and Vault. What looks like a porch actually leads down steps to the family vault below the Sidney Chapel.

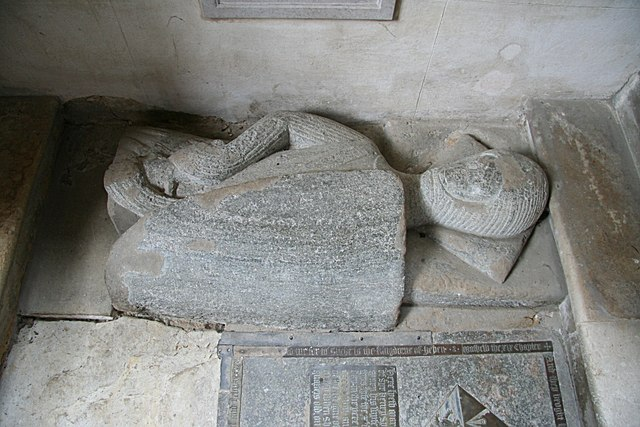
Memorial to Stephen de Pencester (d. 1299)

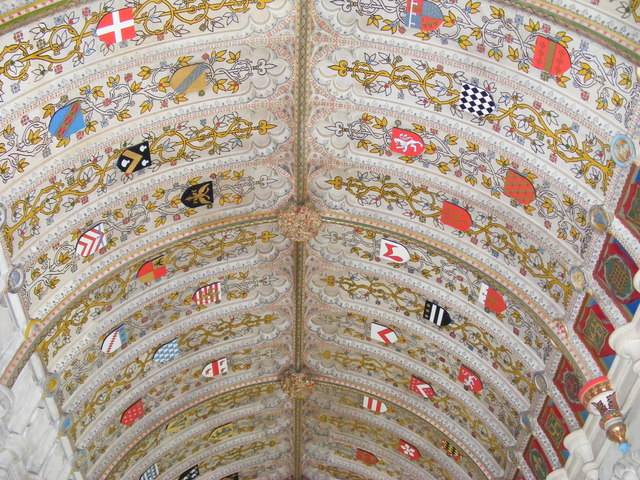
The ceiling of the Sidney Chapel

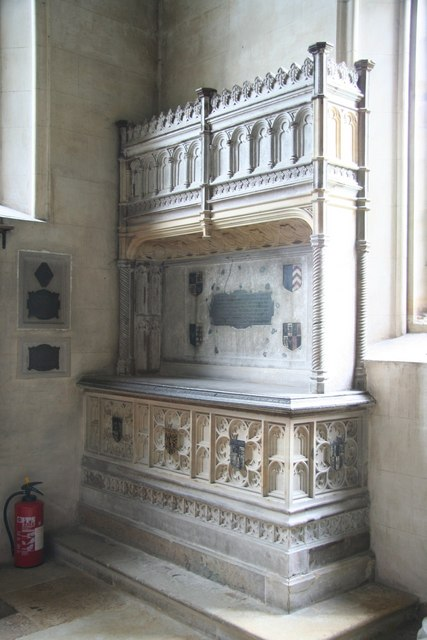
Tomb of Sir William Sidney (1482?–1554)

The Sidney Chapel in the South-East of the church is the Sidney family's private chapel and they remain responsible for its upkeep. The Sidney family has lived in Penshurst Place for over 450 years. Family members enter the church through a gate directly from the garden of Penshurst Place and sit in this chapel during church services to this day.

The Sidney Chapel is the third chapel on the site. It rises above the line of the South aisle, and has a 19th-century East window. On the South side, it has a three light 19th century window (one light blocked) with a square head and its own projecting South porch with a curved, embattled parapet. The South door with a square surrounded with foliage carving in the spandrels and a coat of arms above it, flanked by inverted torches. Internally the porch is rib-vaulted. There is a narrow, 13th-century arch which reaches from the South aisle in the church into the chapel, and next to it is a 13th-century lancet that now opens internally from the chapel to the aisle, indicating that the aisle was once narrower than the chapel.

Before it was rebuilt in 1820, the chapel appears to have been late 13th century. The extensive rebuilding was carried out to designs by John Biagio Rebecca (c.1777–1847), a decorative painter and architect, who also built Castle Goring and worked at Penshurst Place c.1818. As part of the reworking, the Sidney Chapel received an elegant pointed tunnel vault, panelled and painted, and with carved bosses on the ribs. The tunnel-vaulted ceiling with its many heraldic shields was restored in 1966.

The most important memorials (see image) found in the Sidney Chapel include:

- Lying against the south wall, the top half of a recumbent figure in chain mail, in Purbeck marble, of Stephen de Pencester (d. 1299). The legs have been broken off, but from the sword drawing posture of the figure it is reasonable to assume that they were originally crossed.
- At the eastern end of the southern wall, monument with a tomb-chest and a panelled back-plate, known as an altar-tomb, commemorating Sir William Sidney (1482?–1554) to whom King Edward VI gave Penshurst Place in 1552. It is of characteristic late Perpendicular design with little Renaissance detailing and the back plate is framed by twisted shafts that carry a deep, panelled cresting.
- A brass to Margaret Sidney, who died in 1558 in the reign of 'King Philip and Queen Mary'. She was the daughter of Sir Henry Sidney and sister of the famous Sir Philip Sidney.
- A cross to Thomas Bullayen, brother of Anne Boleyn, the second wife of King Henry VIII and mother of Queen Elizabeth I.
- A wall monument to Robert Sidney, 4th Earl of Leicester (1649–1702) and the nine of his 15 children who died before reaching adulthood. This is by William Stanton and William Woodman. On a pedestal, two children who reached the age of six are shown as dancing angels with large wings, holding out their hands to balance an urn. Infant heads in the clouds above are titled with the names of the Earl's children. The monument was commissioned and its words set by his wife, Lady Elizabeth Egerton, who outlived her husband by what she describes on the memorial as "seven tedious years".
- At the north-east end of the chapel (nearest to the altar) a marble tomb chest to Philip Sidney, 5th Earl of Leicester (1676–1705) and various of his descendants. It has a grey obelisk behind a magnificent coat of arms and the words on the top of the tomb chest describe his ancestry across several generations.
- A memorial brass to Thomas Yden, who died in 1514, and to his wife Agnes.
- A memorial to Sophia, Lady De L'Isle (1795–1837), signed by W Theed. It is a life-sized figure of a lady in Grecian draperies on a pedestal. She holds a Bible and raises her eyes aloft.
- Inlaid in the floor is a simple Cumberland slate to Field Marshal The 6th Viscount Gort, VC, GCB, CBE, DSO & Two Bars, MVO, MC (1886–1946).
- On the south wall is the simple memorial to The 1st Viscount De L'Isle, VC, KG, GCMG, GCVO, KStJ, PC (1909–1991), 15th Governor-General of Australia, and his wife Jacqueline (1914–1962), daughter of Field Marshal Lord Gort.

=== North Aisle ===
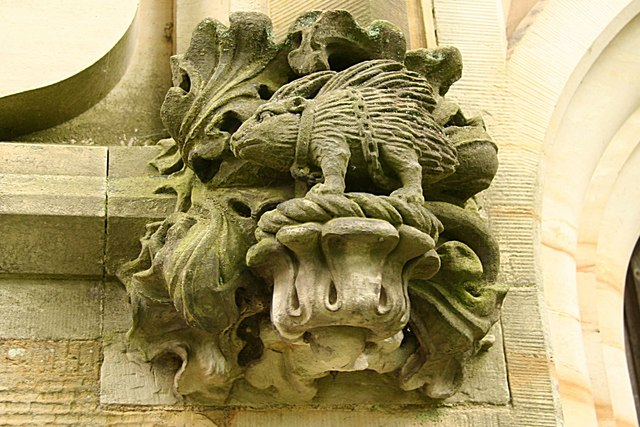
Stone carving of the famous porcupine crest of the Sidneys

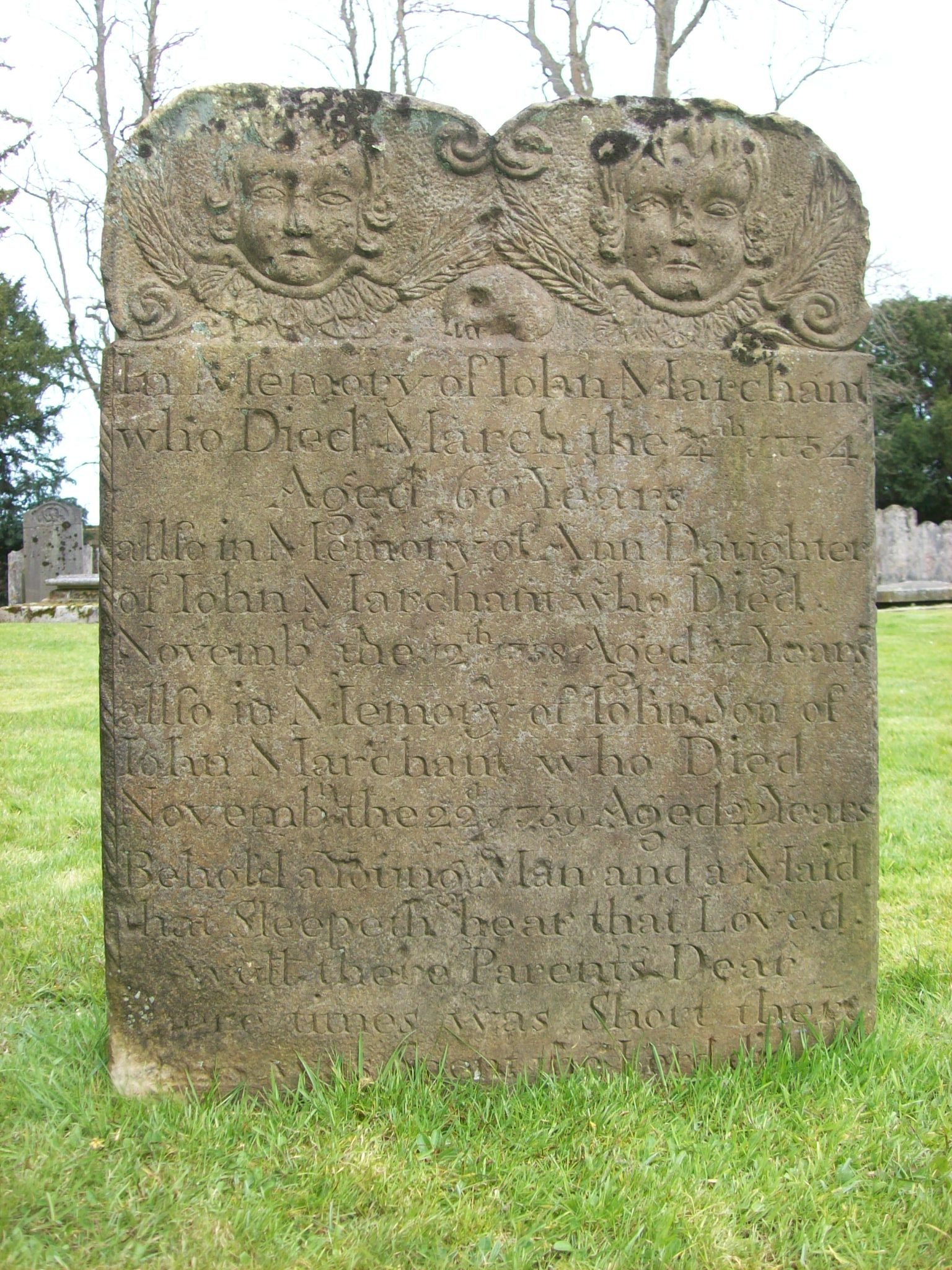
18th century gravestone

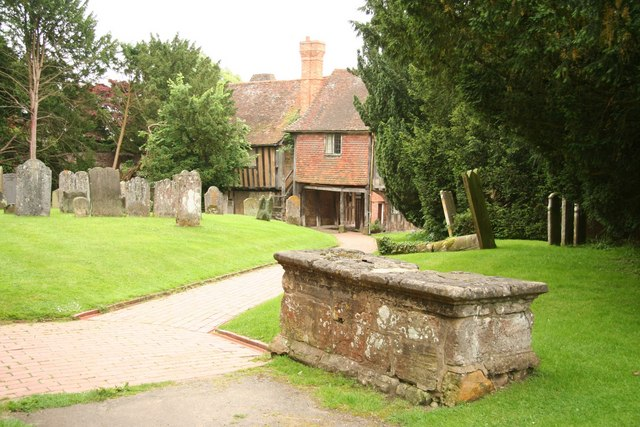
Churchyard in front of the porch is the Dole Table

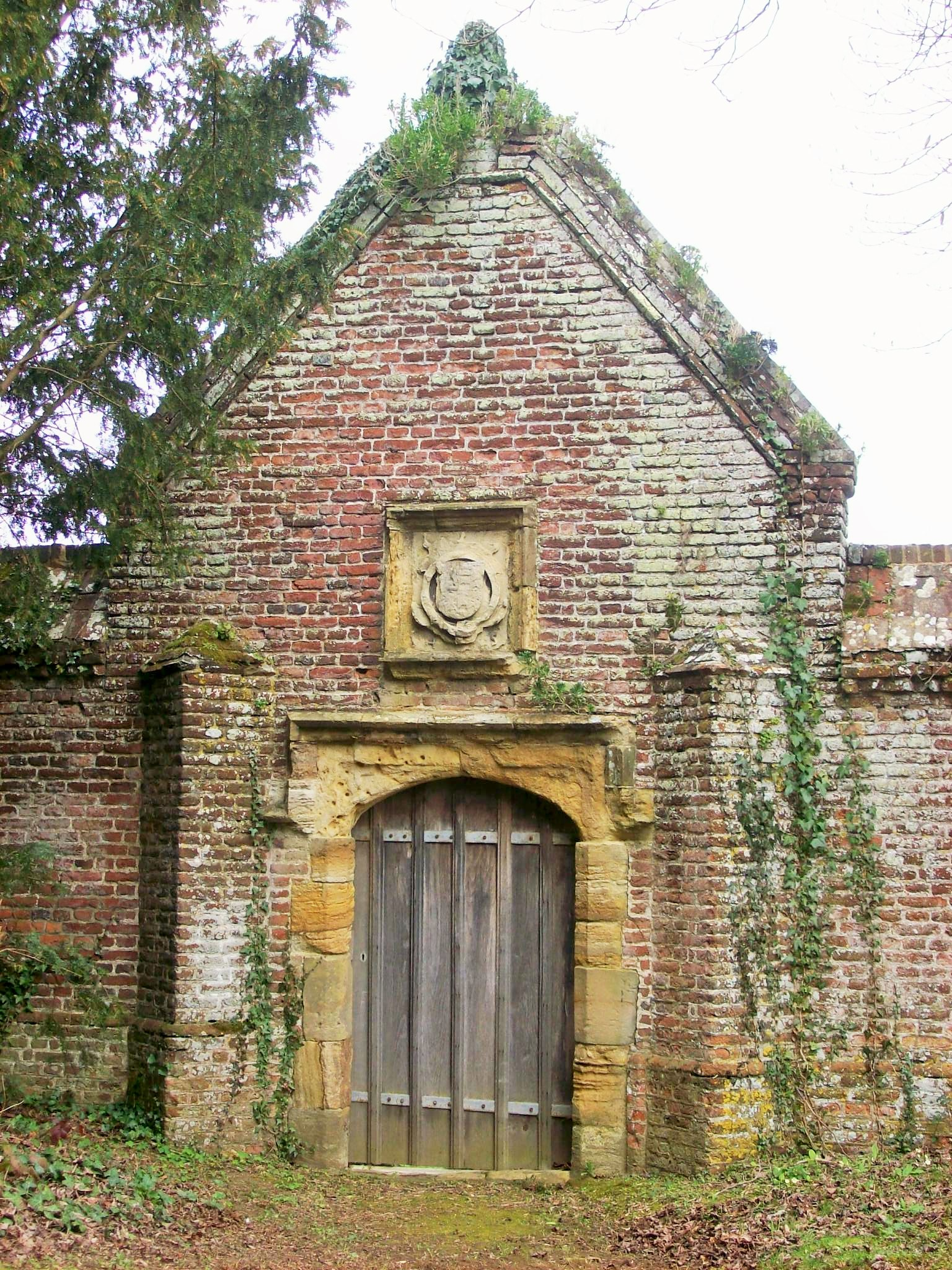
Sidney Gate in the churchyard

The North Aisle was broadened in 1854–1855 to the designs of George Gilbert Scott. Its roof is scissor braced. Between the two windows are two brass tablets in memory of the Reverend George Richard Boissier (d. 1858), rector of Penshurst and Maria, his wife, of whom it is noted that she was the daughter of Richard Allnutt, who has his own tablet at the eastern end of the North Aisle. This is to the right of the window, before the screen separating the Vestry from the aisle. Richard Allnutt was a prosperous wine merchant who built a Palladian mansion at South Park, south west of the Penshurst, in the second half of the 18th century.

At the North Aisle's western end, to the left of the first window is a memorial to Field Marshal The 1st Viscount Hardinge, GCB, PC (1785 –1856), designed by Salvin and carved by Pfyffers, a Gothic tablet with a medallion. He served as Governor-General of India at the time of the First Anglo-Sikh War and was Commander-in-Chief of the Forces during the Crimean War.

=== Organ ===
The organ was built by J. W. Walker & Sons Ltd in 1907. The organ has 2 manuals and pedalboard with 33 speaking stops including two 32 feet stops on the pedal division.

=== Monuments ===
The church has a collection of notable monuments from the 13th to the 19th century:

- Two 13th-century coffin slabs under the tower, one with a cross superimposed over the figure of a praying woman.
- Memorial to Gilbert Spencer, d. 1730, a large tablet in the chancel.

The War Memorials and their roll of names mention the village's dead during three wars within the first half of the 20th century - the Boer War, World War I and World War II.

== Churchyard ==
In the churchyard in front of the porch is the Dole Table, a large stone table which was used once a year to distribute money to the needy of the village.

Among those buried in the churchyard is Richard Sax, a farmer who was murdered following an argument with a farm labourer who worked on the estate of Lieutenant-General Lord Baden-Powell.

== Rectory ==
From the 13th to the 20th century, the parish priests of Penshurst lived next door to the church in a Rectory. The building was gifted by the Sidney family to the local Parochial Church Council, who became concerned at the costs of maintenance and gifted it to the Diocese of Rochester. In the 1990s, the Diocese decided to sell the original Rectory and build a smaller, replacement in the garden of its predecessor.
