= Philip Sidney, 2nd Baron De L'Isle and Dudley =

British politician

The Right Honourable The Lord De L'Isle and Dudley DL
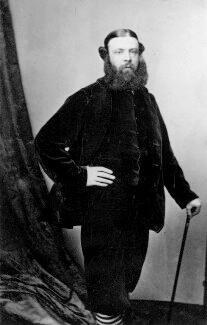

Member of the House of Lords
- Lord Temporal
- In office 4 March 1851 – 17 February 1898
- Preceded by: The 1st Baron De L'Isle and Dudley
- Succeeded by: The 3rd Baron De L'Isle and Dudley

Personal details
- Born: Philip Sidney; 28 January 1828 London, England
- Died: 17 February 1898 (aged 70) Westminster, London
- Spouse(s): Mary Foulis (m. 1850; died 1891) Emily Frances Ramsay (m. 1893)
- Children: 5
- Parent(s): Philip Sidney, 1st Baron De L'Isle and Dudley; Lady Sophia FitzClarence
- Relatives: Sir John Shelley-Sidney, 1st Baronet (paternal grandfather); William IV (maternal grandfather)
- Education: Eton College

Philip Sidney, 2nd Baron De L'Isle and Dudley (28 January 1828 – 17 February 1898), was an English hereditary peer.

== Early life ==
Sidney was born in London, England, on 28 January 1828. He was the youngest child and only son born to Philip Sidney, 1st Baron De L'Isle and Dudley, and his wife, the former Lady Sophia FitzClarence. His mother was an illegitimate daughter of King William IV and his mistress, the actress Dorothea Jordan. His father was the only son of Sir John Shelley-Sidney, 1st Baronet, and Henrietta Hunloke, and was a first cousin of poet Percy Bysshe Shelley.

He was educated at Eton.

== Career ==
Sidney was an Officer in the Royal Horse Guards, gaining the rank of Lieutenant. Upon his father's death in March 1851, he succeeded as the 3rd Shelley-Sidney baronets of Penshurst Place and the 2nd Baron De L'Isle and Dudley, of Penshurst in the County of Kent.

Lord De L'Isle and Dudley served as a trustee of the National Portrait Gallery.

== Personal life ==
On 23 April 1850, Sidney was married to Mary Foulis (1826–1891), the only child of Sir William Foulis, 8th Baronet, and the former Mary Jane Ross (second daughter of Gen. Sir Charles Lockhart-Ross, 7th Baronet, and Lady Mary Rebecca FitzGerald, eldest daughter of William FitzGerald, 2nd Duke of Leinster). Upon his marriage to Mary, he assumed the additional name of Foulis after that of Sidney by Royal Warrant on 6 June 1850, under the will of his father-in-law, but relinquished it after her death in 1891. Together, they were the parents of:

- Philip Sidney, 3rd Baron De L'Isle and Dudley (1853–1922), who married Lady Elizabeth Maria (née Vereker) Astell, widow of William Harvey Astell and fourth daughter of Standish Vereker, 4th Viscount Gort, and the former Hon. Caroline Harriet Gage (third daughter of Henry Gage, 4th Viscount Gage) in 1902.
- Algernon Sidney, 4th Baron De L'Isle and Dudley (1854–1945), who served in the 2nd Boer War and died unmarried.
- Hon. Henry Sidney (1858–1896), who died unmarried.
- William Sidney, 5th Baron De L'Isle and Dudley (1859–1945), who married Winifred Agneta Yorke Bevan, eldest daughter of Roland Yorke Bevan and the former Hon. Agneta Olivia Kinnaird (fourth daughter of Arthur Kinnaird, 10th Lord Kinnaird) in 1905.
- Hon. Mary Sophia Sidney (d. 1903), who died unmarried.

Lady De L'Isle and Dudley died on 14 June 1891. He remarried on 25 January 1893 to Emily Frances Ramsay, eldest daughter of William Fermor Ramsay of Croughton Park and the former Emily Susan Tredcroft (fourth daughter of Rev. Robert Tredcroft, Prebendary of Chichester Cathedral).

Lord De L'Isle and Dudley died at Westminster, London, on 17 February 1898 and was buried at Penshurst. After his death, his widow married Sir Walter Stirling, 3rd Baronet, in February 1903; they divorced in 1909. She died on 3 November 1926.

=== Descendants ===
Through his youngest son William, he was posthumously the grandfather of William Philip Sidney, who was created Viscount De L'Isle, of Penshurst in the County of Kent, on 12 January 1956.

Peerage of the United Kingdom
Preceded by Philip Sidney	Baron De L'Isle and Dudley; 1851–1898; Member of the House of Lords (1851–1898)	Succeeded by Philip Sidney
Baronetage of the United Kingdom
Preceded by Philip Sidney	Baronet of Penshurst Place; 1851–1898	Succeeded by Philip Sidney
