= Sir Charles Shelley, 5th Baronet =

Sir Charles Shelley
- Born: 14 May 1838
- Died: 20 July 1902 (aged 63–64)
- Title: 5th Baronet of Castle Goring
- Spouse: Lady Mary Stopford (1851–1937)
- Parent(s): John Shelley (1806–1866); Elizabeth Bowen (died 1889)

Lieutenant-Colonel Sir Charles Shelley, 5th Baronet, JP (14 May 1838 – 20 July 1902), was a British Army officer and Hampshire landowner.

Shelley was born in 1838, the second son of John Shelley (1806–1866) by his wife Elizabeth Bowen (died 1889). His paternal grandfather was Sir Timothy Shelley, 2nd Baronet. On the death of a cousin, Sir Percy Shelley, in 1889, his elder brother Edward Shelley (1827–1890) succeeded as 4th Baronet. Sir Edward died childless the following year, when Charles succeeded to the baronetcy.

He served in the Scots Guards from 1855 to 1871, when he retired as a lieutenant-colonel.

He lived at Avington park, near Winchester, which his father had purchased from the last Duke of Buckingham and Chandos, and was a well-known figure in Hampshire, where he was a Justice of the peace (JP). He died on 20 July 1902.

== Family ==
Shelley married, in 1869, Lady Mary Jane Jemima Stopford (1851–1937), daughter of the 5th Earl of Courtown. They had nine children, including the 6th, 7th and 8th baronets. His son Cecil William Charles Shelley died while serving with the Scots Guards during the First World War, on 17 October 1915.

Baronetage of the United Kingdom
Preceded by Edward Shelley	Baronet of Castle Goring; 1890–1902	Succeeded by John Shelley-Rolls
