= Timothy Shelley =

English politician and lawyer (1753–1844)

Sir Timothy Shelley Bt
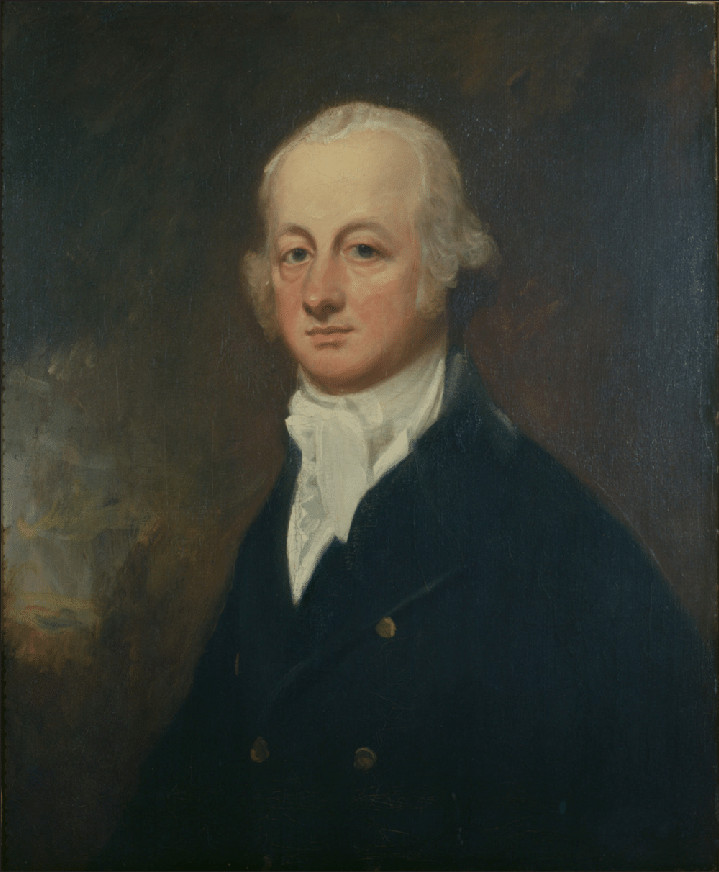
- Portrait by George Romney (1791)

Member of Parliament for New Shoreham
- In office 1802–1818 Serving with Sir Cecil Bisshopp (1802–1806); Sir Charles Burrell (1806–1818)
- Preceded by: Sir Cecil Bisshopp; Charles William Wyndham
- Succeeded by: Sir Charles Burrell; Sir James Lloyd

Member of Parliament for Horsham
- In office 1790–1792 Serving with Wilson Gale-Braddyll
- Preceded by: Jeremiah Crutchley; Philip Metcalfe
- Succeeded by: Lord William Gordon; James Baillie

Personal details
- Born: 7 September 1753
- Died: 24 April 1844 (aged 90)
- Spouse: Elizabeth Pilfold (m. 1791)
- Children: 7; including Percy
- Parent(s): Sir Bysshe Shelley; Mary Catherine Mitchell
- Education: University College, Oxford

Sir Timothy Shelley, 2nd Baronet (7 September 1753 – 24 April 1844) was an English politician and lawyer. He was the son of Sir Bysshe Shelley, 1st Baronet, and the father of Romantic poet Percy Bysshe Shelley.

== Early life and education ==
Timothy Shelley was the son of Sir Bysshe Shelley and his wife Mary Catherine Michell (1734–1760), daughter of the Reverend Theobald Michell and his wife Mary Tredcroft. He studied at University College, Oxford, and was awarded his bachelor's degree in 1778, his master's degree following in 1781. He then studied law at Lincoln's Inn.

== Career ==
Shelley was elected as a member of parliament (MP) for Horsham, Sussex, at the 1790 general election, but an election petition was lodged and the result was overturned on 19 March 1792. He was elected as MP for New Shoreham at the 1802 general election. Shelley was re-elected for Shoreham in 1806, 1807, and 1812, and held the seat until he stood down at the 1818 general election.

He associated with the Duke of Norfolk during his time in the British political sphere.

== Personal life ==
Shelley married Elizabeth Pilfold in October 1791 and they moved to Field Place in Warnham, West Sussex, approximately 40 miles (64 km) outside London. The couple had seven children:

- Percy Bysshe (1792–1822), English Romantic poet
- Elizabeth (1794–1831)
- Hellen (1796–1796)
- Mary (1797–1884)
- Hellen (1799–1885)
- Margaret (1801–1887)
- John (1806–1866)

None of Shelley's daughters married except for Mary, who in 1819 married D. F. Haynes.

== Titles ==
- Mr Timothy Shelley (1753–1790)
- Mr Timothy Shelley MP (1790–1815)
- Sir Timothy Shelley (1815–1844)

Shelley inherited the baronetcy on 6 January 1815, becoming the 2nd Baronet Shelley of Castle Goring, Sussex.

== Ancestry ==
Sir Timothy Shelley, 2nd Baronet of Castle Goring

16. Mr. Shelley
8. John Shelley of Fen Place
4. Timothy Shelley of Fen Place (born c. 1700)
18. Roger Bysshe
9. Helen Bysshe
2. Sir Bysshe Shelley
5. Johanna Plum
1. Sir Timothy Shelley (7 September 1753 – 24 April 1844)
6. Theobald Michell
3. Mary Catherine Michell
7. Mary Tredcroft

Parliament of Great Britain
Preceded by Jeremiah Crutchley; Philip Metcalfe	Member of Parliament for Horsham; 1790–1792; With: Wilson Braddyll	Succeeded by Lord William Gordon; James Baillie
Parliament of the United Kingdom
Preceded by Charles Wyndham; Sir Cecil Bisshopp	Member of Parliament for New Shoreham; 1802–1818; With: Sir Cecil Bisshopp to 1806; Sir Charles Burrell, Bt from 1806	Succeeded by James Martin Lloyd; Sir Charles Burrell, Bt
Baronetage of the United Kingdom
Preceded by Bysshe Shelley	Baronet of Castle Goring; 1815–1844	Succeeded by Percy Shelley
