= Philip Sidney, 1st Baron De L'Isle and Dudley =

British politician

The Right Honourable The Lord De L'Isle and Dudley GCH

Member of Parliament for Eye
- In office 19 October 1829 – 14 March 1831 Serving with Sir Edward Kerrison
- Preceded by: Sir Miles Nightingall; Sir Edward Kerrison
- Succeeded by: Sir Edward Kerrison; William Burge

Member of the House of Lords
- Lord Temporal
- In office 13 January 1835 – 4 March 1851
- Preceded by: Peerage created
- Succeeded by: The 2nd Baron De L'Isle and Dudley

Personal details
- Born: Philip Charles Shelley Sidney; 11 March 1800
- Died: 4 March 1851 (aged 50)
- Party: Tory
- Spouse: Lady Sophia FitzClarence (m. 1825; died 1837)
- Children: The Hon. Adelaide FitzClarence-Hunloke; The Hon. Ernestine Perceval; Countess Sophia von Kielmansegg; Philip Sidney, 2nd Baron De L'Isle and Dudley
- Parent(s): Sir John Shelley-Sidney, 1st Baronet; Henrietta Hunloke
- Relatives: William IV (father-in-law)
- Education: Eton College; Christ Church, Oxford

Philip Charles Shelley Sidney, 1st Baron De L'Isle and Dudley (11 March 1800 – 4 March 1851), was a British Tory politician.

== Early life ==
Sidney was the only son of Sir John Shelley-Sidney, 1st Baronet, and Henrietta Hunloke. The poet Percy Bysshe Shelley was his first cousin. He was educated at Eton and Christ Church, Oxford.

== Marriage and issue ==
On 13 August 1825, he married Lady Sophia FitzClarence, illegitimate daughter of King William IV and his mistress, the actress Dorothea Jordan. Lord and Lady De L'Isle and Dudley had four children:

- Hon. Adelaide Augusta Wilhelmina Sidney (1 June 1826 – 20 September 1904). Married her first cousin, Hon. Frederick FitzClarence-Hunloke (son of George FitzClarence, 1st Earl of Munster), in 1856; no issue.
- Philip Sidney, 2nd Baron De L'Isle and Dudley (28 January 1828 – 17 February 1898). Married firstly to Mary Foulis in 1850; had issue. Married secondly to Emily Frances Ramsay in 1893; no issue.
- Hon. Ernestine Wellington Sidney (9 January 1834 – 20 September 1910). Married to Philip Perceval in 1868; had issue.
- Hon. Sophia Philippa Sidney (11 March 1837 – 12 May 1907). Married to Count Alexander von Kielmansegg in 1871; no issue.

== Career ==
Sidney represented Eye in the House of Commons from 1829 to 1831 and also served as an equerry to his father-in-law from 1830 to 1835 and as Surveyor-General of the Duchy of Cornwall from 1833 to 1849. In 1835, fourteen years before he succeeded his father, he was raised to the peerage as Baron De L'Isle and Dudley, of Penshurst in the County of Kent.

== Death ==
Lord de L'Isle and Dudley died in March 1851, aged 50, and was succeeded in his titles by his son Philip.

Parliament of the United Kingdom
Preceded by Sir Miles Nightingall; Sir Edward Kerrison	Member of Parliament for Eye; 1829–1831	Succeeded by Sir Edward Kerrison; William Burge
Peerage of the United Kingdom
New creation	Baron De L'Isle and Dudley; 1835–1851	Succeeded by Philip Sidney
Baronetage of the United Kingdom
Preceded by John Shelley-Sidney	Baronet of Penshurst Place; 1849–1851	Succeeded by Philip Sidney
