= Penshurst Place =

Historic medieval house in Kent, England

Coordinates: 51°10′29″N 0°11′02″E

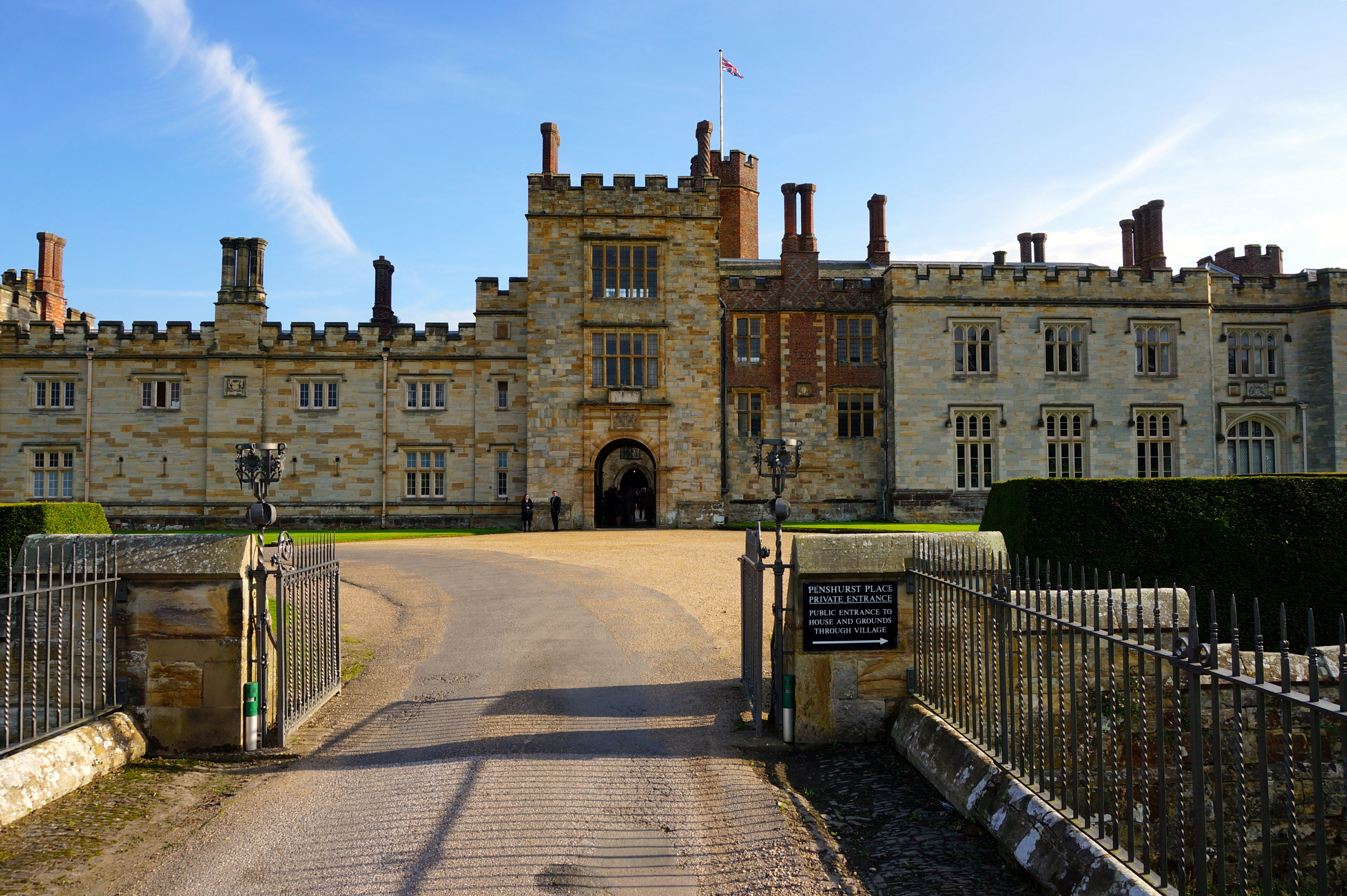
Private entrance to Penshurst Place

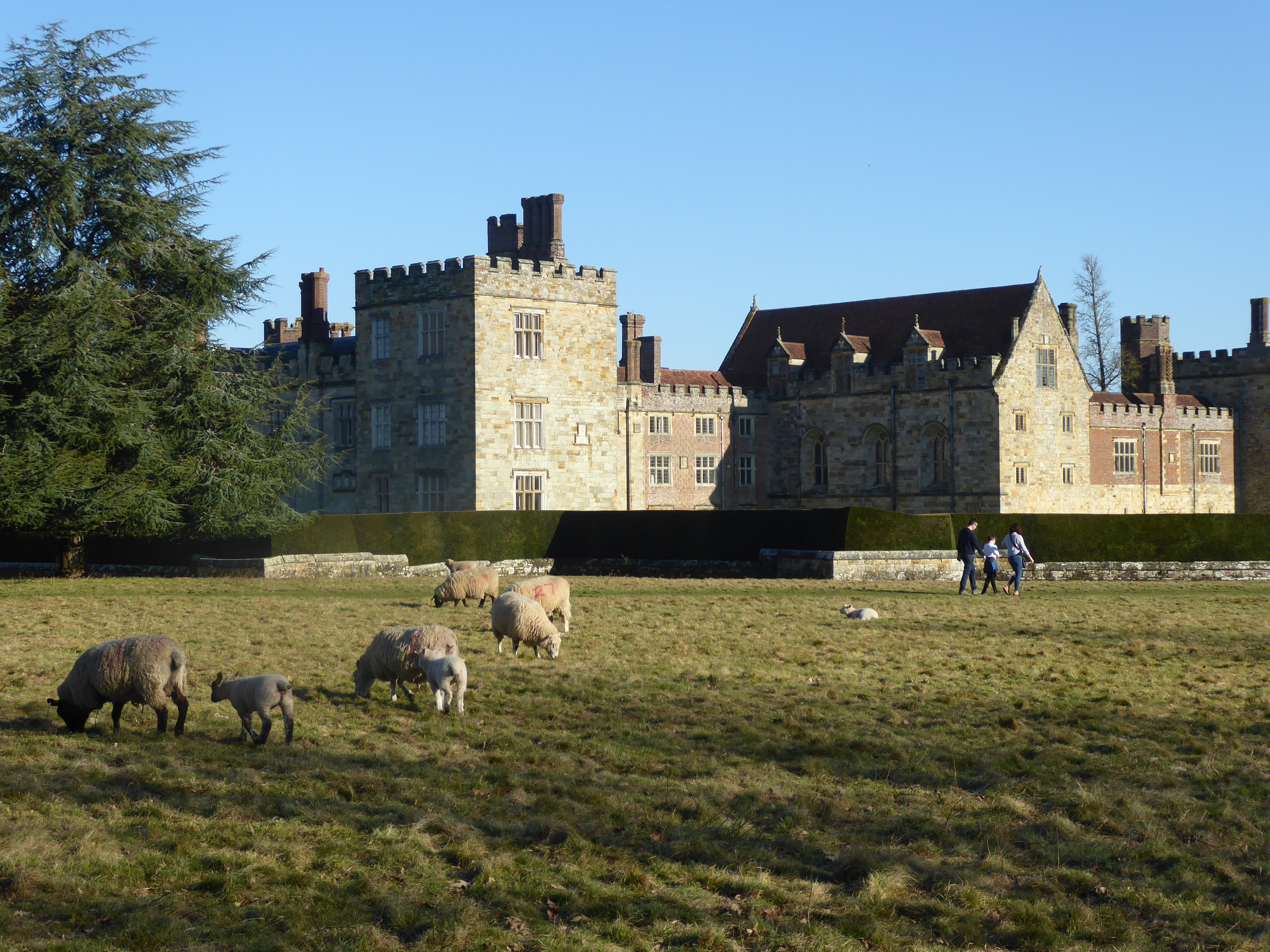
Sheep and lambs at Penshurst Place

Penshurst Place is a historic building near Penshurst, Kent, 32 miles (51 km) southeast of London, England. It is the ancestral home of the Sidney family, and was the birthplace of the great Elizabethan poets and courtiers, siblings Mary Sidney and Philip Sidney.

The original medieval house is one of the most complete surviving examples of 14th-century domestic architecture in England. Part of the house and its gardens are open for public viewing. Many TV shows and movies have been filmed at Penshurst.

== History ==
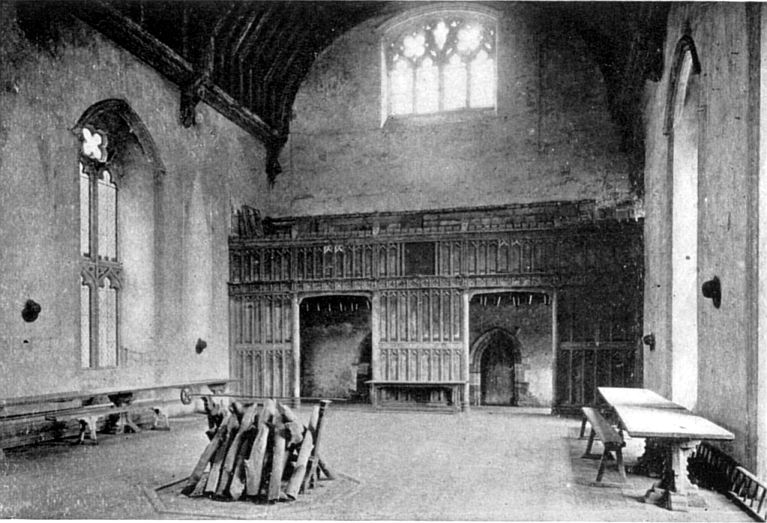
The Great Hall at Penshurst Place, circa 1915

Penshurst Place was built as a hall house in 1341 for Sir John de Pulteney, a London merchant and four times Lord Mayor of London who wanted a country residence within easy distance of London. This was at the time when such properties ceased to be castles: they were more like dwellings that could be defended in an emergency. When Henry IV's third son, John, Duke of Bedford, occupied Penshurst, the second hall, known as the Buckingham Building, was built: so called after the subsequent owners, the Dukes of Buckingham. Edward Stafford, 3rd Duke of Buckingham was executed in 1521 by Henry VIII following a lavish feast held at Penshurst Place hosted by the Duke in honour of Henry in 1519; it then stayed in the crown estate for the rest of Henry's reign, with documented evidence that Henry used Penshurst Place as a hunting lodge and visited with his courtier Brandon, the property being only a few miles from Hever Castle, the childhood home of Henry's second wife Anne Boleyn.

In 1550, Henry VIII's son, King Edward VI, granted the house and estate to Sir Ralph Fane, a supporter of Protector Somerset, but it was forfeited two years later after Sir Ralph was executed for treason.

=== Sidney family ===
Penshurst Place was enlarged after 1552 when King Edward VI granted the house to Sir William Sidney (1482–1554), who had been a courtier to the King's father, Henry VIII. Sir William's son Henry (1529–1586) married Lady Mary Dudley, whose family became implicated in the Lady Jane Grey affair, although Henry himself escaped any such implications. During his lifetime he added apartments and the "King's Tower" to Penshurst. He employed a joiner, Evan Lucas, to supply panelling and carve ornaments including leopard's heads for the hall and gallery. Henry Sidney also created what is now one of England's oldest private gardens, with records going back to 1346.

Philip Sidney (1554–1586), Henry's son, was born at Penshurst Place in 1554. Poet and courtier, he was buried in Old St Paul's Cathedral in London, having died twenty-five days after a bullet wound to the thigh at the battle of Zutphen; his tomb was destroyed in the Great Fire of London in 1666.

Philip's brother Robert Sidney inherited Penshurst. His time there resulted in more additions to the state rooms, including an impressive "Long Gallery". He had also inherited the Earldom of Leicester, and his descendants for the next seven generations continued to live at the mansion.

=== Restoration ===
By the 19th century, the building was falling into disrepair, but a new occupant in 1818, Sir John Shelley-Sidney, uncle of Percy Bysshe Shelley, gained ownership of the property. He began to restore the building with architect J. Rebecca.

His son Philip Sidney, 1st Lord De L'Isle and Dudley, continued the restoration. Under Philip's care, a stable wing was constructed, which currently houses a Toy Museum.

=== Opening to the public ===
The 5th Baron, William Sidney (1909–1991), inherited Penshurst Place in 1945. He was one of only two men who held both the Victoria Cross and membership of the Order of the Garter; he was created 1st Viscount De L'Isle in 1956. Much of the modern restoration of Penshurst is due to him and to his son, the 2nd Viscount; it had suffered neglect during World War I. Penshurst Place opened to the public in 1946 to help offset the cost of wartime damages.

Many members of the family are buried or commemorated in the Sidney Chapel at St John the Baptist, Penshurst.

== Main features of the house ==
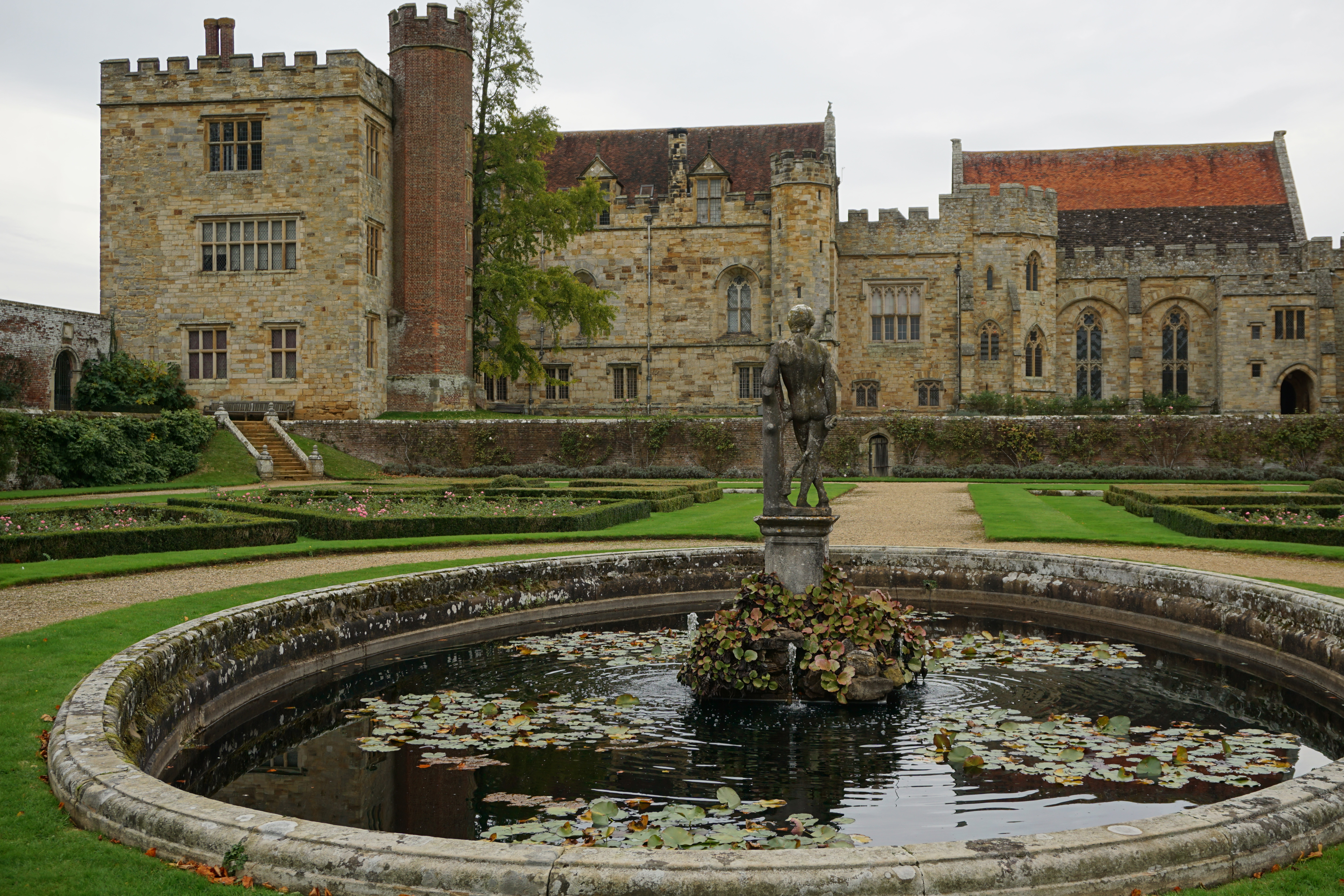
View of the house from the garden

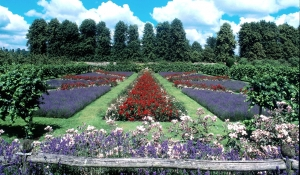
Flag Garden at Penshurst Place

It is possible to see in the house the evidence of occupation over its 670-year history:

- The State Rooms, filled with a collection acquired by generations of the Sidney family.
- The West Solar, or State Dining Room, part of the medieval building, contains a collection of family portraits, furniture and porcelain.
- The Queen Elizabeth Room, named after Queen Elizabeth I, with its display of early upholstered furniture.
- The Tapestry Room
- The Long Gallery, full of royal and family portraits
- The Nether Gallery: with an array of arms and armour
- Toy Museum – features toys from several generations of the Sidney family, includes dolls, doll houses, teddies, toy soldiers, mechanical toys and general play items
- Queen Victoria's stool: in one of the smallest rooms of the house, there is a green stool on display. Queen Victoria sat on this stool when she was pronounced Empress of India in 1876.

=== Sidney Oak ===
One notable element of the property was the Sidney Oak tree, estimated to have grown for more than 1000 years. It died in 2016 and was commemorated with a plaque on the property in 2017. It was listed as one of Britain's 50 Great Trees during Queen Elizabeth II's Golden Jubilee. An oil painting depicting the tree and the Penshurst property was gifted to the Victoria and Albert Museum in 1857, where it is still housed.

== Filming location ==
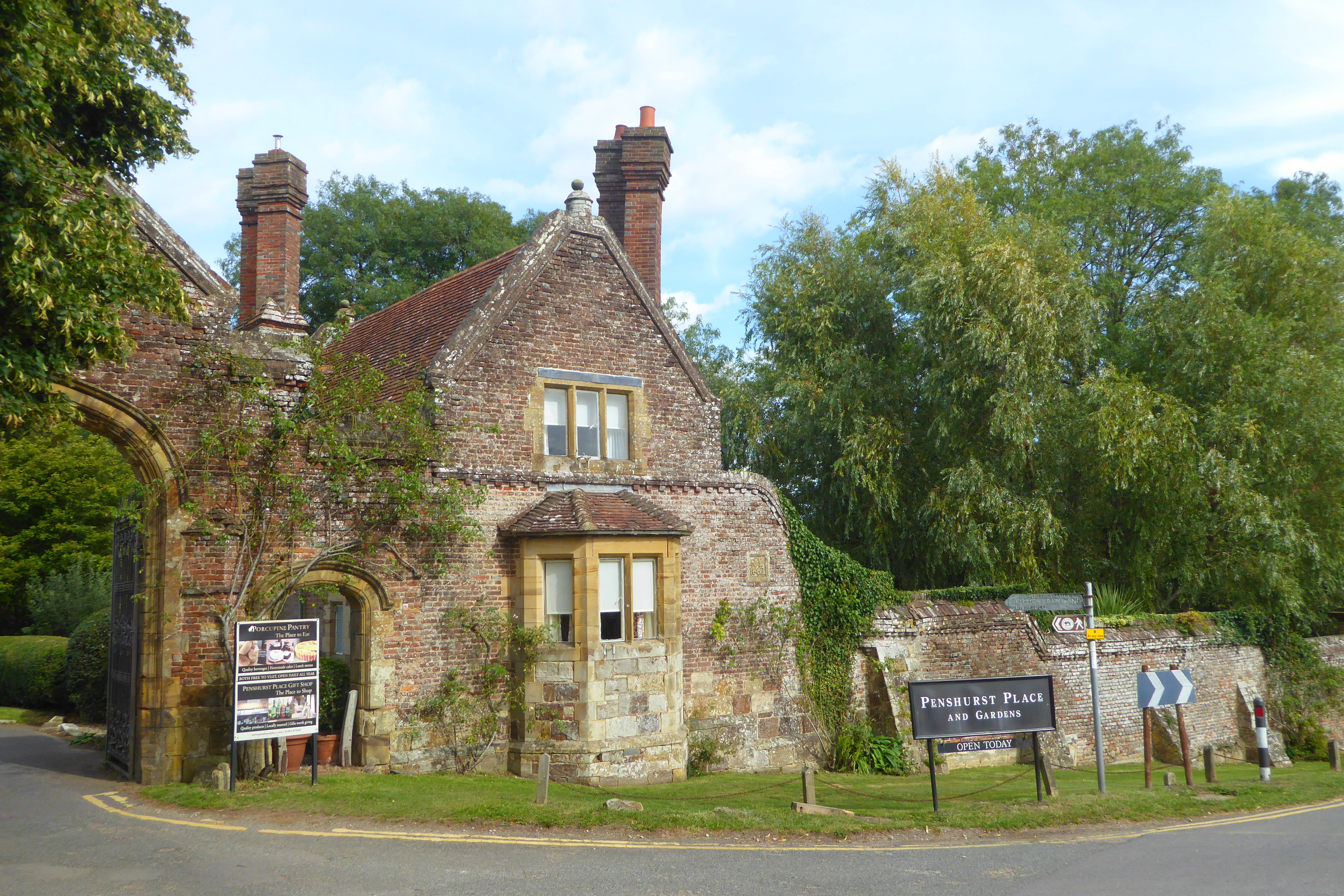
The Grade II-listed gatehouse to Penshurst Place

Penshurst has been used as a filming location, including: Anne of the Thousand Days; the 1971 BBC series Elizabeth R; the 1992 television series Covington Cross; The Other Boleyn Girl; The Princess Bride; the BBC TV show Merlin; The Hollow Crown; and the BBC's 2015 series Wolf Hall.
