= Castle Goring =

Country house in West Sussex, England

Coordinates: 50°50′24″N 0°26′07″W

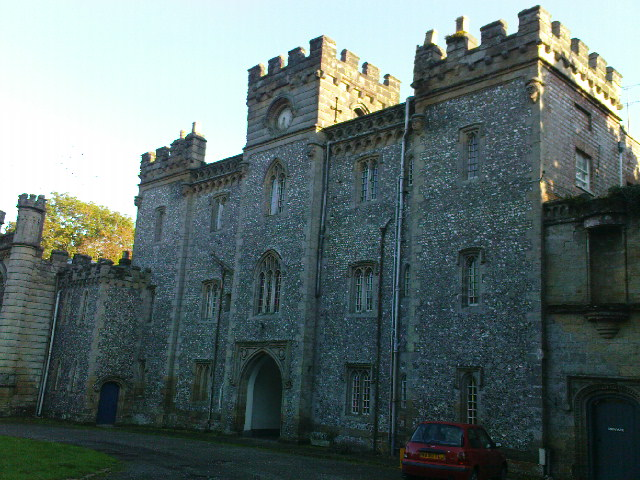
- Castle Goring's Gothic north side
- Interactive map of the Castle Goring area

General information
- Architectural style: Greco-Palladian and Gothic
- Location: Worthing, West Sussex, England
- Completed: 1797–1798
- Cost: £90,000 adjusted for inflation: £10 million
- Client: Sir Bysshe Shelley
- Owner: Lady Colin Campbell

Design and construction
- Architect: John Rebecca

Listed Building – Grade I
- Official name: Castle Goring
- Designated: 11 October 1949
- Reference no.: 1025839

Castle Goring is a country house in Worthing, in West Sussex, England about 4.5 miles (7 kilometres) north-west of the town centre.

One of Worthing's two Grade I listed buildings (deemed by the Department for Culture, Media and Sport to be of exceptional interest), it has been described by architectural critic Ian Nairn as reflecting "the equivocal taste of the 1790s as well as anywhere in the country."

Castle Goring was designed by John Rebecca for Sir Bysshe Shelley, 1st Baronet. It was intended that his grandson, the renowned poet Percy Bysshe Shelley, would live at Castle Goring; however, he drowned in Italy aged 29, so he never took possession of the house.

In 1845, Mary Shelley, who inherited the building as widow of the poet, sold it to Vice-Admiral Sir George Brooke-Pechell, who had been residing at the property as a tenant since 1825. It is currently owned by Lady Colin Campbell.

== Location ==
When it was built in the 1790s, Castle Goring was in the far north of the parish. Since Goring-by-Sea became part of the borough of Worthing in 1929, development has extended to the borders of the Castle Goring estate, and the estate now borders on the West Durrington area of the town, several miles from the original centre of Goring.

Castle Goring lies adjacent to the A27 road from Worthing to Chichester, at grid reference TQ 102056, to the northwest of Worthing. It also lies within the South Downs National Park next to ancient woodland at Titnore Wood.

== Architecture ==
The building has a front and rear of different styles. The north side of Castle Goring is Gothic and is thought to resemble Arundel Castle 8 km (5.0 mi) to the west, while the south side has a Greco-Palladian front of yellow brick, said to be a copy of the Villa Lante near Rome.

English Heritage has described Castle Goring as "the most complete example of the 'carnival-style' of the era".

As the building has always been in private ownership, little is known about the interior. There is known to be a glass dome in the centre of the building, above a spiral staircase. The building's owners do not welcome visitors and relatively few photographs of the building exist in the public domain. However, in 2016 the present owner, Lady Colin Campbell, allowed the interior of the building to be extensively filmed and shown in an ITV documentary, Lady C and the Castle. On 7 January 2017, the castle's interior and exterior were also shown when Lady Colin Campbell was a subject on the ITV show Through the Keyhole. Further views of the interior, including the glass dome which is said to be the oldest in the UK in a private home (and in need of extensive renovation) were shown in an episode of Salvage Hunters on Quest in 2017.

== History ==
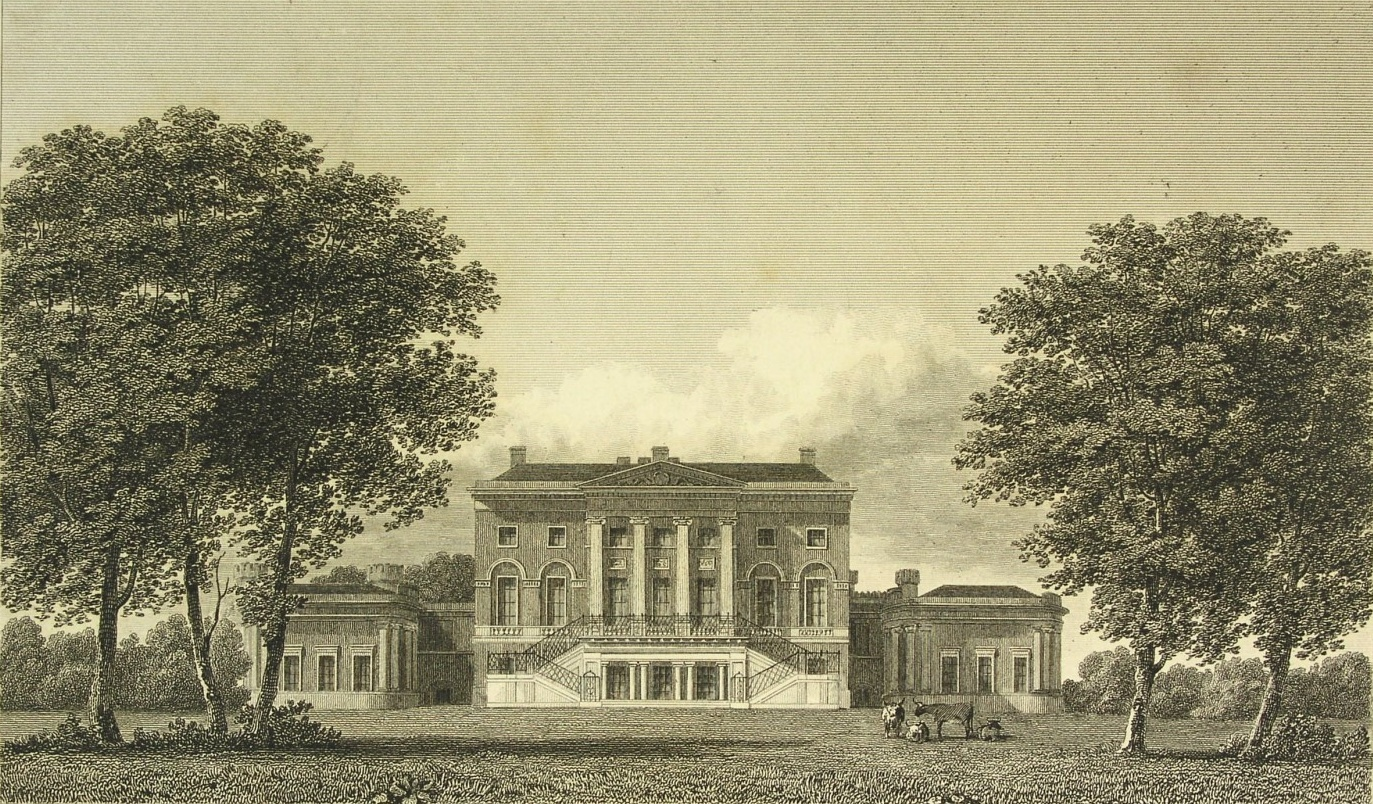
Engraving published 1819 of the Greco-Palladian south side of Castle Goring

Castle Goring was designed by John Rebecca for Sir Bysshe Shelley, 1st Baronet. The building was the first of several that Rebecca designed in the Georgian era around the then fashionable resort town of Worthing. Sir Bysshe Shelley's son, Sir Timothy Shelley, preferred to live at Field Place near Horsham. It was intended that his son, Percy Bysshe Shelley, would live at Castle Goring; however, the poet drowned in Italy aged just 29, so he never took possession.

In 1825, Sir Timothy Shelley let the building to Captain (later Vice Admiral) Sir George Brooke-Pechell, 4th Baronet of Paglesham, lord of the manor of Angmering, who was Whig MP for Brighton from 1835 to 1860. In 1845, Mary Shelley, who inherited the building as widow of the poet, sold it to Brooke-Pechel. Brooke-Pechel's daughter, Adelaide, married Sir Alfred FC Somerset, who was Deputy Lieutenant for Middlesex and Justice of the Peace for Middlesex. Their daughter Gwendoline married her cousin, Arthur W Fitzroy Somerset, who held the same offices for Sussex.

Aside from a period in the 1870s and 1880s when the property was let to the Burrell family, the property remained with the Somerset family until 2013. Lady Colin Campbell is the current owner.

== Future ==
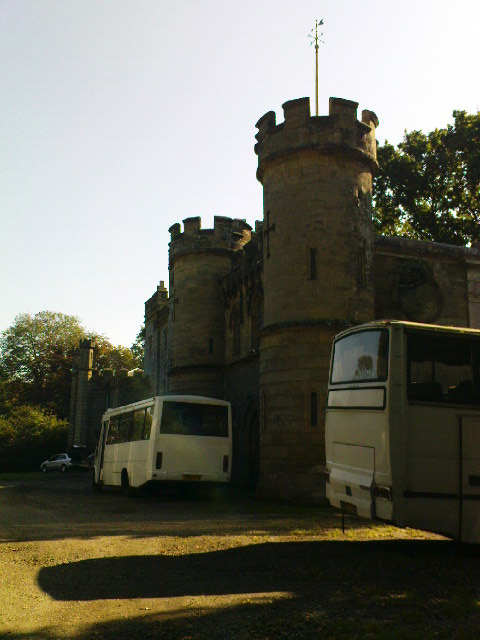
Castle Goring, Worthing, West Sussex, England

By the start of the 21st century, the future of the building had looked bleak. Castle Goring had been left to decay to the point that it was on Historic England’s Heritage at Risk Register, which described its situation as "very grave". Historic England described Castle Goring as being of priority category A, its highest priority. It was defined as at "immediate risk of further rapid deterioration or loss of fabric; no solution agreed".

Structural surveyors working on behalf of Worthing Borough Council tried, unsuccessfully, to gain access to the building several times. A full survey of Castle Goring was finally carried out in July 2003, using the council's legal powers to gain entry. The report was completed in January 2004 and set out details of the repairs considered necessary to "retain the architectural and historic importance of the building and sets out a timescale over which the repairs should be carried out".

It is known that an evaluation study was carried out for a golf resort within the castle estate. However, it was not clear whether the building itself would have been renovated under the scheme. In 2010, Castle Goring and its estate was included in the South Downs National Park.

In 2013, Lady Colin Campbell purchased the property and in November 2015, she said that she had decided to be a contestant on the popular television show I'm a Celebrity...Get Me Out of Here! in order to pay to replace the castle's roof.

The Heritage at Risk Register reports that consent for change of use to a wedding/conference venue has been granted and repairs to the roof, stairs and structural timbers have been carried out. It is now priority category F.

== See also ==
- Listed buildings in Worthing
- Shelley Baronets
