= Goring railway station =

Goring railway station may refer to:

- Goring & Streatley railway station in Oxfordshire, England
- Goring-by-Sea railway station in Sussex, England
