= Brenock O'Connor =

British actor

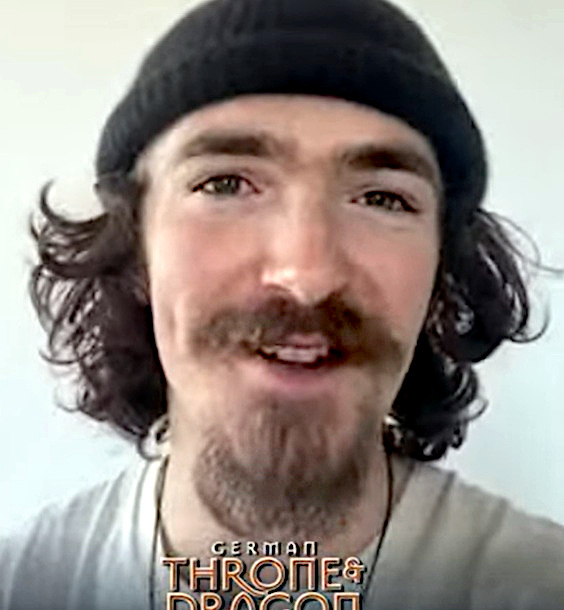
- O'Connor - German Throne & Dragon Con 2025
- Born: Brenock Grant O'Connor; Worthing, West Sussex, England
- Education: Chatsmore Catholic High School
- Occupations: Actor and singer
- Years active: 2012–present

Brenock Grant O'Connor is an English actor and singer. He is best known for his portrayal of Olly in the HBO fantasy TV series Game of Thrones (2014–2016). He was part of the main casts of the British series Dickensian (2015–2016), Living the Dream (2016–2019), and, most recently, the Amazon Prime series Alex Rider (2020–2024). He is also a musician under the artist name "McGovern."

== Early life ==
Growing up, O'Connor attended the Chatsmore Catholic High School (now Saint Oscar Romero Catholic School) in Goring and studied theatre at The Theatre Workshop Stage School in Brighton. He started performing on stage at the age of six in the Hammond Pantomimes at the Pavilion Theatre in Worthing, and won a theatre scholarship while attending.

== Career ==
O'Connor's big break was in 2014 as Olly in the HBO fantasy television series Game of Thrones. The character was introduced originally as a one episode character, to further the story between the Wildlings and the Night's Watch at Castle Black, but was kept on the show to provide more backstory surrounding the deaths of Ygritte and Jon Snow in the fourth and fifth seasons, respectively. O'Connor appeared in seventeen episodes throughout the series, with his last appearance in the sixth-season episode "Oathbreaker," when he was hanged by a resurrected Jon Snow.

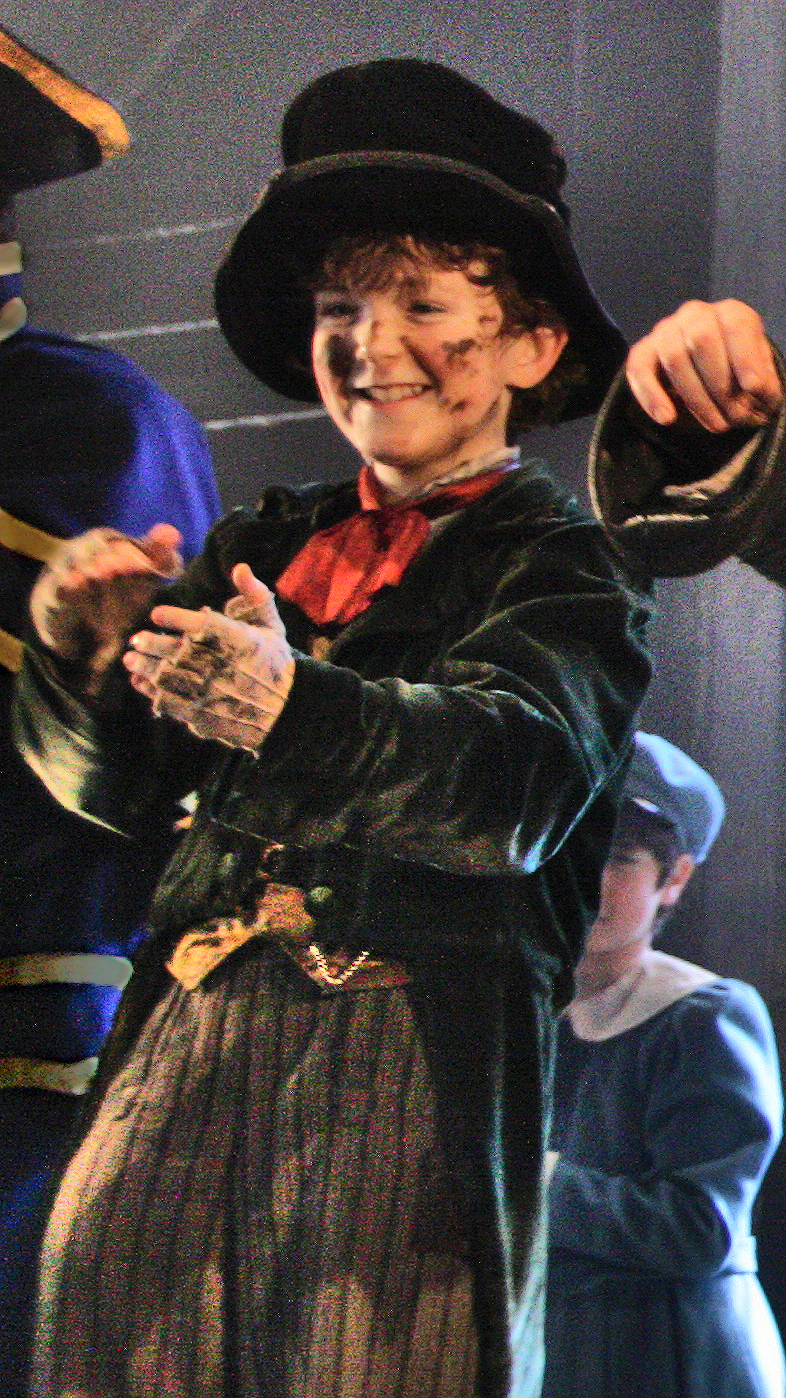
Brenock O'Connor as the Artful Dodger in Oliver! 2013

Regarding his character Olly's betrayal of Jon Snow in the fifth-season episode "Mother's Mercy," O'Connor stated that he received many negative messages from fans of the show, as well as some positive messages from people regarding his performance in the role. In a subsequent interview, O'Connor stated he was content with the controversial reaction to his character, noting "It's very rare for my character to get noticed really, so I was quite happy with the reaction that I got. When you do something bad, you want a bad reaction for it."

O'Connor has also appeared in several other roles, including Peter Cratchit in the BBC One series Dickensian, which premiered in December 2015. He also starred in the 2015 British children's adventure film Young Hunters: The Beast of Bevendean. He appeared in a music video with Noah and the Whale as well as several television commercials for Haribo, and as a lead character part in one episode of Holby City.

On stage O'Connor has performed in front of audiences on the tour of Cameron Mackintosh's Oliver!, playing the part of The Artful Dodger alongside Iain Fletcher, Neil Morrissey and Samantha Barks. In addition to acting, O'Connor is a singer and guitarist, and has posted several cover songs on YouTube.

In 2019, O'Connor was cast for the part of Conor Lawlor in the musical adaptation of Sing Street based on the 2016 movie by John Carney, who also directed Once and was adapted for the stage as a musical as well. The Sing Street musical adaptation was originally presented at New York Theatre Workshop in December 2019. It was scheduled to premiere on Broadway at the Lyceum Theatre in Spring 2020 with an Original Cast Recording already released. However, due to the COVID-19 pandemic, the production's premiere was pushed back until the end of 2021.

O'Connor auditioned for the role of Alex Rider in the 2020 television series of the same name, but was instead given the role of Tom Harris, Alex's best friend. In an interview O'Connor stated that he did not mind not playing the lead character, saying "To be involved in this in any way is a dream come true. The books are just a major influence on my childhood."

== Filmography ==
=== Film ===
Year	Title	Role	Notes
2015	Young Hunters: The Beast of Bevendean	Sam Aldrington	
2017	Another Mother's Son	Rex Forster	
2018	The Bromley Boys	David Roberts	
2023	Double Blind	Paul	
2025	The Spin	Dermot	

=== Television ===
Year	Title	Role	Notes
2012	Holby City	Angus Peters	Episode: "Blood Money"
2013	Chickens	Dribbler	Episode: "Rebel Girl"
2014–2016	Game of Thrones	Olly	17 episodes
2015–2016	Dickensian	Peter Cratchit	12 episodes
2016	Casualty	Peter Barnes	Episode: "All I Want for Christmas Is You"
2017–2019	Living the Dream	Freddie Pemberton	Main role; 12 episodes
2018–2022	The Split	Sasha	4 episodes
2019–2022	Derry Girls	Jon	2 episodes
2020–2024	Alex Rider	Tom Harris	Main role; 16 episodes
2024	Secret Level	Amos (voice)	Episode: "The Outer Worlds: The Company We Keep"

=== Theatre ===
Selected credits

Year	Title	Role	Venue	Notes	Ref.
2012–13	Oliver!	Artful Dodger	UK Tour		
2017	Plastic	Vincent	Theatre Royale	Original production	
2019–20	Sing Street	Conor Lawlor	New York Theatre Workshop	Original off-Broadway production	
2019–20	Sing Street	Conor Lawlor	Lyceum Theatre	Broadway production; delayed opening after COVID-19	

=== Video games ===
Year	Title	Role	Notes
2022	Xenoblade Chronicles 3	Garvel	

== Awards and nominations ==
Year	Association	Category	Nominated work	Result
2015	Saturn Awards	Best Performance by a Younger Actor in a Television Series	Game of Thrones	Nominated
2015	Screen Actors Guild Awards	Outstanding Performance by an Ensemble in a Drama Series	Game of Thrones	Nominated
