= Goring-by-Sea =

Suburb of Worthing, West Sussex, England

Coordinates: 50.8122°N 0.42436°W

Goring-by-sea
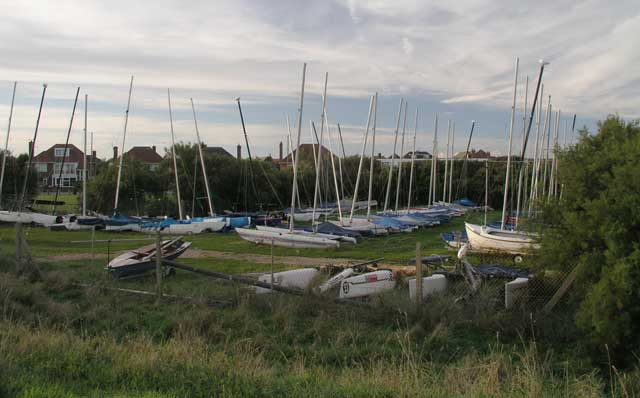
- The yacht club, 2006

- Location within West Sussex
- Population: 7,990 (2011. Goring Ward)
- OS grid reference: TQ111025
- District: Worthing
- Shire county: West Sussex
- Region: South East
- Country: England
- Sovereign state: United Kingdom
- Post town: WORTHING
- Postcode district: BN12
- Dialling code: 01903
- Police: Sussex
- Fire: West Sussex
- Ambulance: South East Coast
- UK Parliament: Worthing West

Goring-by-Sea, commonly referred to simply as Goring, is a neighbourhood of Worthing and former civil parish, now in Worthing district in West Sussex, England. It lies west of West Worthing, about 2.5 miles (4 km) west of Worthing town centre. Historically in Sussex, in the rape of Arundel, Goring has been part of the borough of Worthing since 1929.

== Etymology ==
It is thought that the place-name Goring may mean either 'Gāra's people', or 'people of the wedge-shaped strip of land'. Usually known as "Goring", the "by-Sea" suffix has been added to differentiate it from the village of Goring-on-Thames in Oxfordshire.

== History ==
Around the 6th century Goring became part of the kingdom of Sussex. Like in other villages in the south of Sussex, the people of Goring had land to the north that they used as summer pasture in the Weald, at Goringlee, near Coolham. This route would have been used as a droveways for driving livestock, especially pigs. The parish of Goring existed at the time of the Domesday survey in 1086, under the name Garinges. Unlike the other parishes in the area covered by the present Borough of Worthing, which have been in the Rape of Bramber since the 11th century, Goring forms part of the neighbouring Rape of Arundel. (Rapes are the six ancient subdivisions of the county of Sussex, each named after a castle and its associated town.) The former parish of Goring incorporated four manors. The most important of these passed from the Earls of Arundel to Roger de Montalt, 1st Baron Montalt and several other holders.

The former parish of Goring included Castle Goring, a country house built for Sir Bysshe Shelley, 1st Baronet in the late 1790s. Intermittent residential development began in the 19th century and continued throughout the 20th century. Although the railway came to Goring in 1846, there were so few passengers using Goring station that it was closed for a period. Goring's population expanded after 1929, when it became part of the borough of Worthing, and again in 1938 when the railway was electrified. Over a period of around 50 years, much of old Goring was demolished, although a few buildings survive. Begun shortly before 1939, the Goring Hall estate was developed as a garden city, with concentric crescents near the seafront.

In 1921, the parish had a population of 653. On 1 April 1929, the parish was abolished and merged with Worthing.

== Geography ==
Goring has a mixed pebble and sand beach which is a popular beachgoing area for a wide variety of watersports including kitesurfing. The southwest of Goring contains part of the Goring Gap, a protected area of fields and woodland between Goring and Ferring. The former village of Goring lies in the south of the former parish. North-east of this is the Maybridge estate. North of Maybridge is West Durrington. To the north and west of West Durrington lies Castle Goring, Titnore Wood and the eastern slopes of Highdown Hill, including Highdown Gardens.

== Landmarks ==
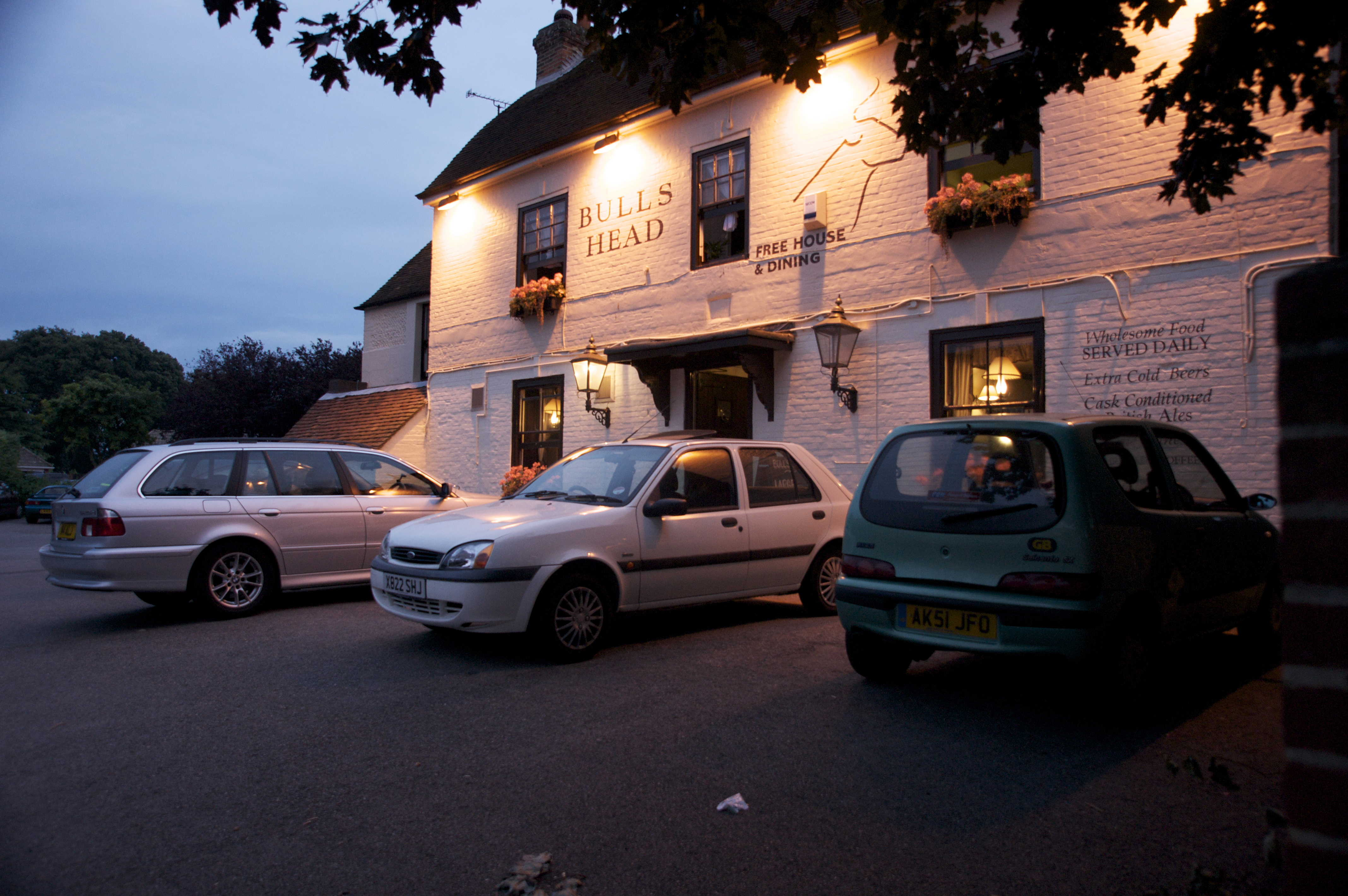
The Bull's Head on Goring Street has been a pub since at least as far back as 1770

St Mary's Church, the Anglican parish church, was originally built c. 1100AD as the Church of Our Blessed Ladye of Gorynge, and was rebuilt in 1837 by Decimus Burton for David Lyon of Goring Hall.

The Bull's Head on Goring Street has existed as a pub since at least 1770. This may be the same pub that was closed in the early 17th century by puritan-minded Justices of the Peace.

Courtlands was built in the 1820s and was extended around 1906 to 10 by Paul Schweder.

Built around 1889, Goring Hall is a replica of the original building which was built around 1840 for David Lyon, probably designed by Charles Barry, best known for his role in rebuilding the Palace of Westminster in London. Goring Hall is now used as a hospital, operated by BMI Healthcare. An 1840s avenue of holm oaks leads from Goring Hall to St Mary's Church.

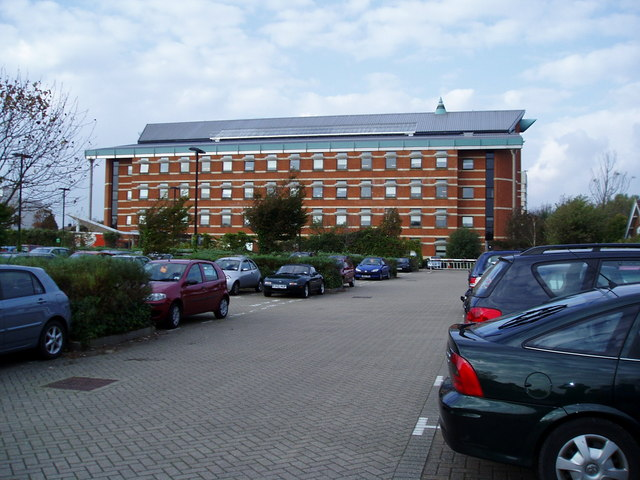
Built in the 1990s, HMRC's Durrington Bridge House on Barrington Road houses 900 employees

The English Martyrs' Catholic Church, dedicated to the English-Catholic Martyrs, has the world's only hand-painted copy of the ceiling of the Sistine Chapel, painted by Gary Bevans between 1987 and 1993.

The red-brick Durrington Bridge House, HM Revenue and Customs' building near Durrrington-on-Sea station on Barrington Road, holds 900 employees. The site is due to be replaced with homes as HMRC is due to relocate in 2021 to Teville Gate in the centre of Worthing.

== Education ==
St Oscar Romero Catholic School on Goring Street is a mixed secondary school that was established in the 1950s. Goring Church of England Primary School is the main primary school for the area. Outside of Goring proper, but within the boundaries of the former parish of Goring is Northbrook College's West Durrington campus. Also known as University Centre Worthing, the site has been part of Greater Brighton Metropolitan College since 2017 and provides both further education and higher education.

== Transport ==
The A259 runs east–west through Goring, connecting it to the centre of Worthing and Brighton to the east, and Littlehampton and Bognor Regis to the west. The A2032 Littlehampton Road which also runs east–west passes north of Goring proper but within the former parish area. Goring is served by two railway stations: Goring-by-Sea railway station in the west, which opened in 1846, and Durrington-on-Sea railway station in the east, which opened in 1937. Both stations lie on the West Coastway Line and connect Goring to Worthing, Brighton, Littlehampton, London and Southampton.

== Notable people ==
- George Saxby Penfold was Vicar of Goring from 1815 to 1832, but held other livings as well.
- George Brooke-Pechell, Royal Navy officer and Whig Member of Parliament for Brighton (1835–1860)
- Keith Emerson, keyboardist, songwriter, and film composer, grew up on the Maybridge estate in Goring.
- Francesca Hayward, ballet dancer
- Billy Idol, musician
- Richard Jefferies, nature writer
- David Lyon, West Indies merchant and Tory Member of Parliament for Bere Alston in Devon
- John Molson, Canadian-born Unionist Member of Parliament for Gainsborough in Lincolnshire
- Arthur Somerset Sr, cricketer for Sussex and London between 1891 and 1906
- Frederick Claude Stern, botanist and horticulturalist

== Bibliography ==
- Brandon, Peter (2006). Sussex. Robert Hale. ISBN 9780709069980.
- Delorme, Mary (1987). Curious Sussex. London: Robert Hale Ltd. ISBN 0-7090-2970-5.
- Elleray, D. Robert (1998). A Millennium Encyclopaedia of Worthing History. Worthing: Optimus Books. ISBN 0-9533132-0-4.
- Henry, James; Walton, Colin (2016). Secret Worthing. Amberley Publishing Limited. ISBN 9781445651415.
- Idol, Billy (2015). Dancing with Myself. Simon and Schuster. ISBN 9781451628517.
- Williamson, Elizabeth; Hudson, Tim; Musson, Jeremy; Nairn, Ian; Pevsner, Nikolaus (2019). Sussex: West. Yale University Press. ISBN 9780300225211.
