= Goring-by-Sea railway station =

Railway station in West Sussex, England

Coordinates: 50°49′04″N 0°25′57″W

Goring by Sea
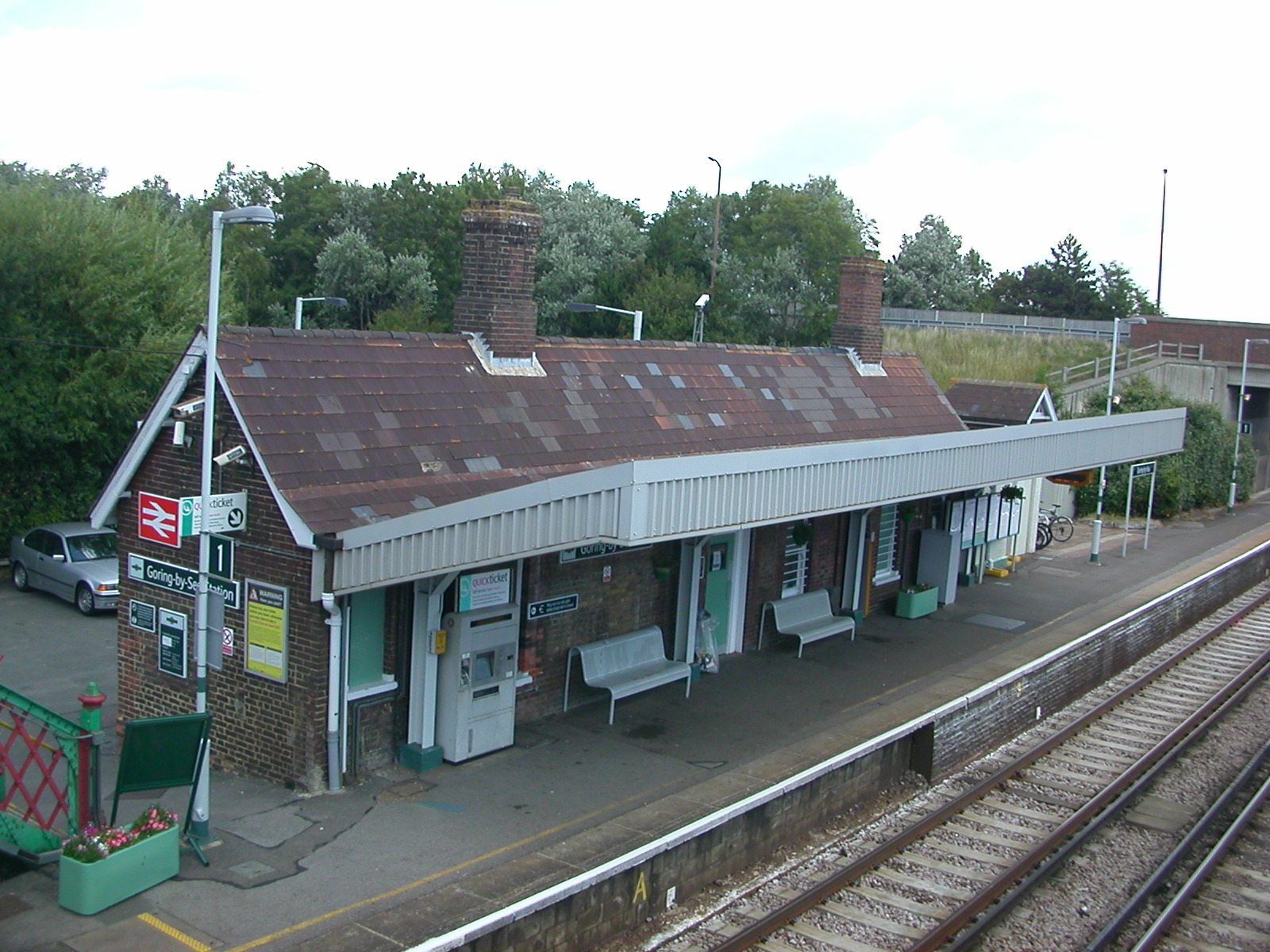

General information
- Location: Goring-by-Sea, Worthing, West Sussex; England
- Grid reference: TQ104031
- Managed by: Southern
- Platforms: 2

Other information
- Station code: GBS
- Classification: DfT category E

History
- Opened: 16 March 1846

Passengers
- 2020/21: ▼0.178 million
- 2021/22: ▲0.425 million
- 2022/23: ▲0.484 million
- 2023/24: ▼0.480 million
- 2024/25: ▲0.549 million
Location
Notes
- Passenger statistics from the Office of Rail and Road

Goring-by-Sea railway station is in Goring by Sea in the county of West Sussex. It is 13 miles 7 chains (21.1 km) down the line from Brighton. The station is operated by Southern. It serves the Worthing suburb of Goring and the neighbouring village of Ferring. It is also located between two education facilities, thus providing a method of transport for students of St. Oscar Romero Catholic School and Northbrook College's West Durrington campus, also known as University Centre Worthing.

This station has a ticket office which is open for part of the day. There is a self-serve ticket machine on either platform at the station. All Southern trains are served by Class 377's.

== History ==
Opened by the Brighton & Chichester Railway on 16 March 1846, Goring-By-Sea is one of the oldest stations on the Sussex coast. Originally called ‘Goring’ and constructed with just a single track, it was soon absorbed by the London, Brighton, and South Coast Railway (LBSCR) who quickly doubled the track.

In 1890, a three road goods yard was opened. A ‘Saxby & Farmer’ signalbox was opened on the upside (platform 1) in 1900 and, in the same year, a cast iron footbridge was constructed. The station was renamed to ‘Goring-by-Sea’ in 1908 to avoid any confusion with Goring & Streatley station on the Great Western mainline. The track was electrified in 1938. In 1958, an awning was constructed over platform 1.

As with all local stations, ownership was transferred to the Southern Railway in 1923 and, subsequently, British Railways in 1948. Although the goods yard was closed in 1962, and the signal box was removed when manual signalling was abolished in 1988, the station has won the ‘Best Kept Station’ for many years. In 1987, the station was refurbished under the new management of Network SouthEast.

The Goring Way flyover was built (when,1970?) which took most traffic away from the station entrance and level crossing. Unusually the crossing was not closed.

In 2020, platform 1 was extended so it could accommodate an 8-carriage train. The cast iron footbridge was renovated in 2021.

== Services ==
All services at Goring-by-Sea are operated by Southern using Class 377 EMUs.

The typical off-peak service in trains per hour is:

- 2 tph to London Victoria via Gatwick Airport
- 2 tph to Brighton
- 2 tph to Littlehampton
- 1 tph to Chichester via Littlehampton
- 1 tph to Portsmouth & Southsea

During the peak hours on Mondays to Thursdays, there is an additional peak-hour service per day between London Bridge and Littlehampton.

On Sundays, the service to Portsmouth & Southsea is extended to Portsmouth Harbour, services between Littlehampton and London Victoria are reduced to hourly, the service to Chichester via Littlehampton does not run, and the station is served by an additional hourly service to Southampton Central.

.

Preceding station	National Rail	Following station
Durrington-on-Sea	Southern West Coastway Line	Angmering

== Facilities ==
Facilities are limited and is the smallest station on the West Coastway line from Littlehampton to Brighton with 3 or more trains per hour on each platform:

- Ticket Office
- Telephone
- Departure boards on each platform and in ticket hall
- Ticket machines on each platform
- Information point
- Seating around station
- Car Park
- Bicycle storage

== Gallery ==
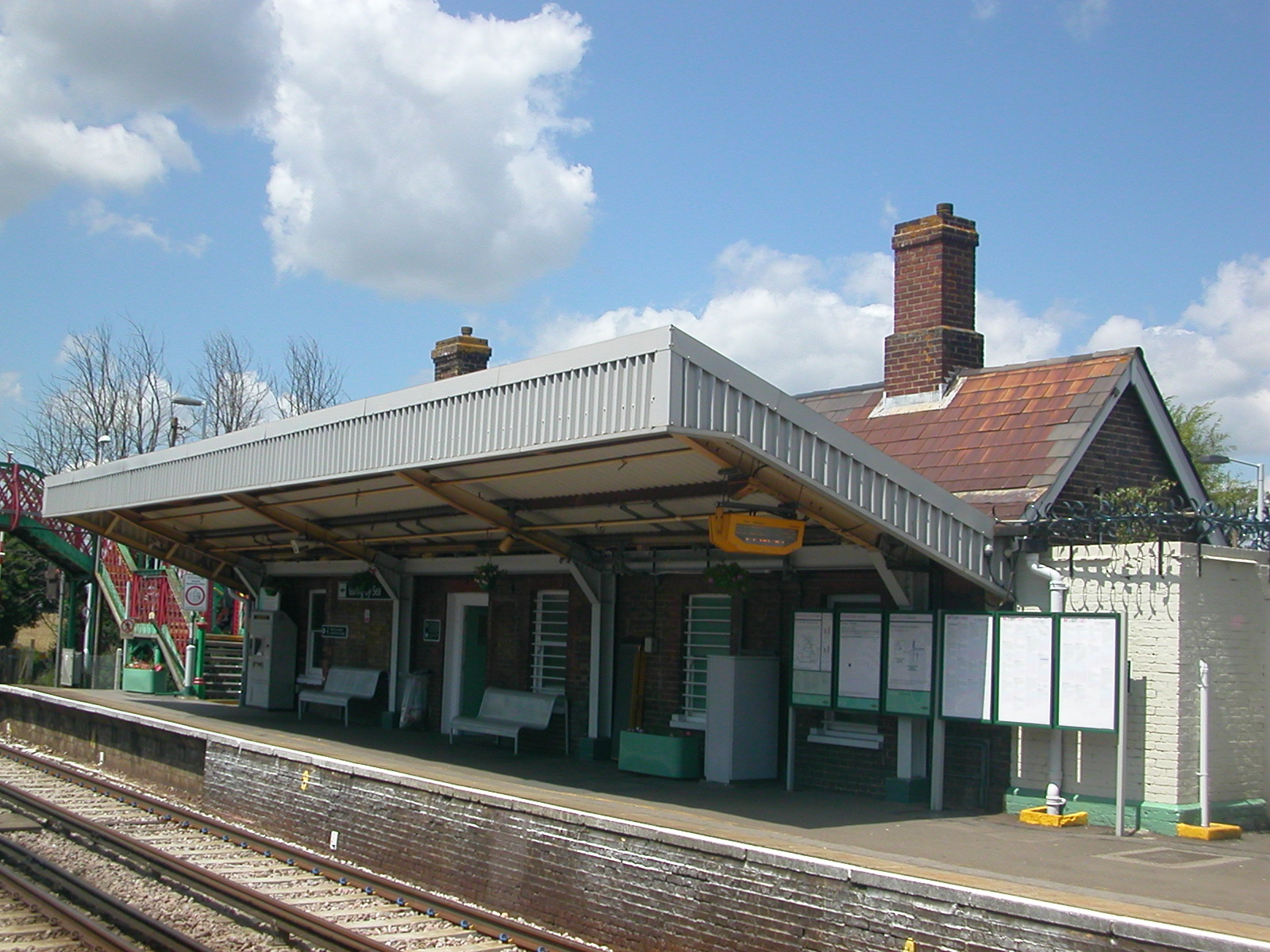
Buildings and canopy on Platform 1, looking west.

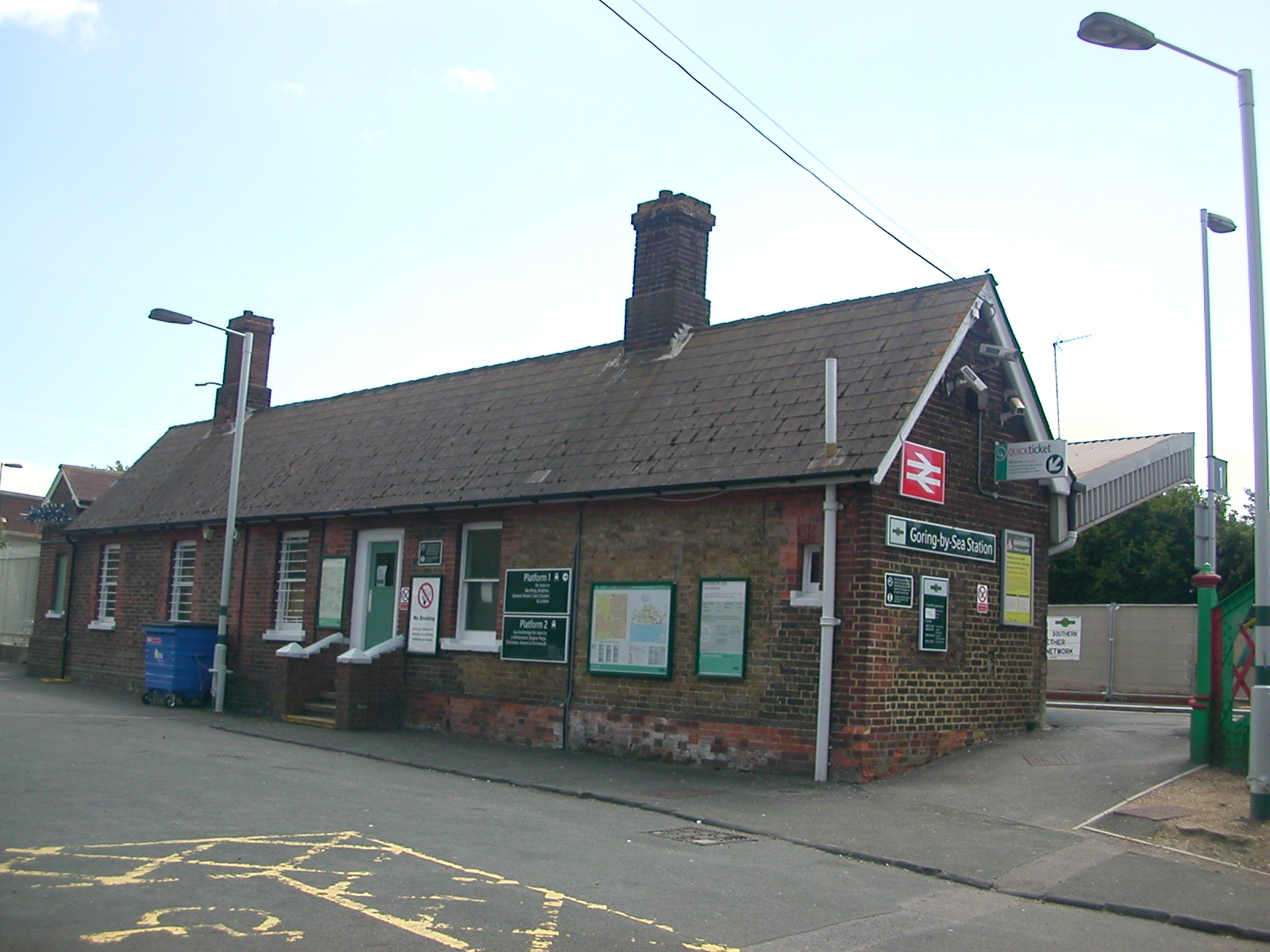
Front of main station building.

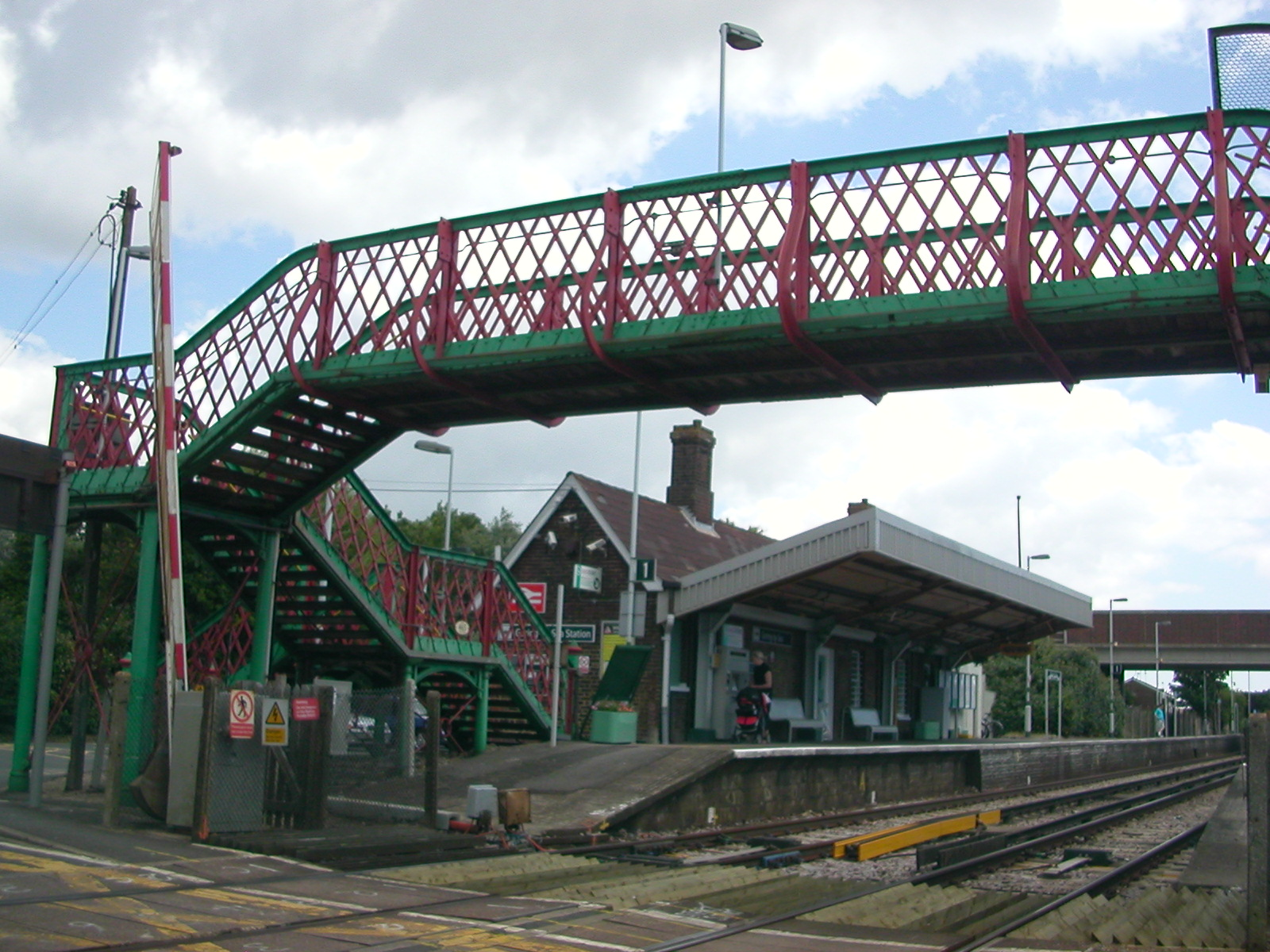
Looking east from the level crossing.

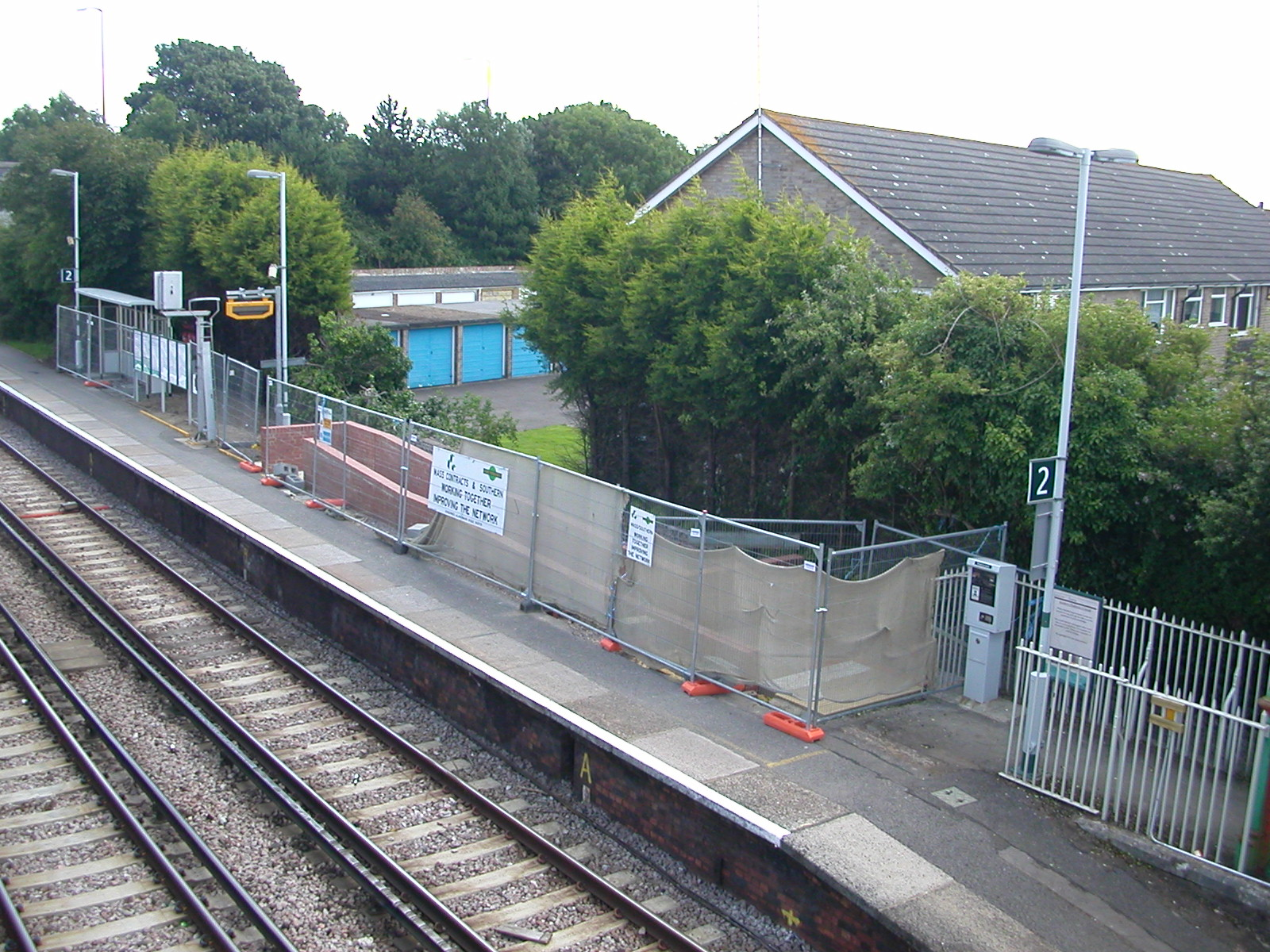
Access to Platform 2 being redesigned in July 2007.

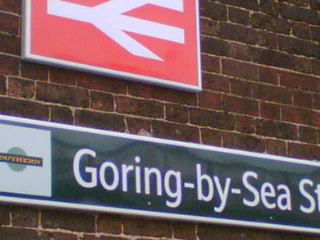
A sign outside Goring-by-Sea railway station.
