= English Martyrs' Catholic Church, Goring-by-Sea =

Church in Worthing, West Sussex, England

English Martyrs Catholic Church, Goring-by-Sea
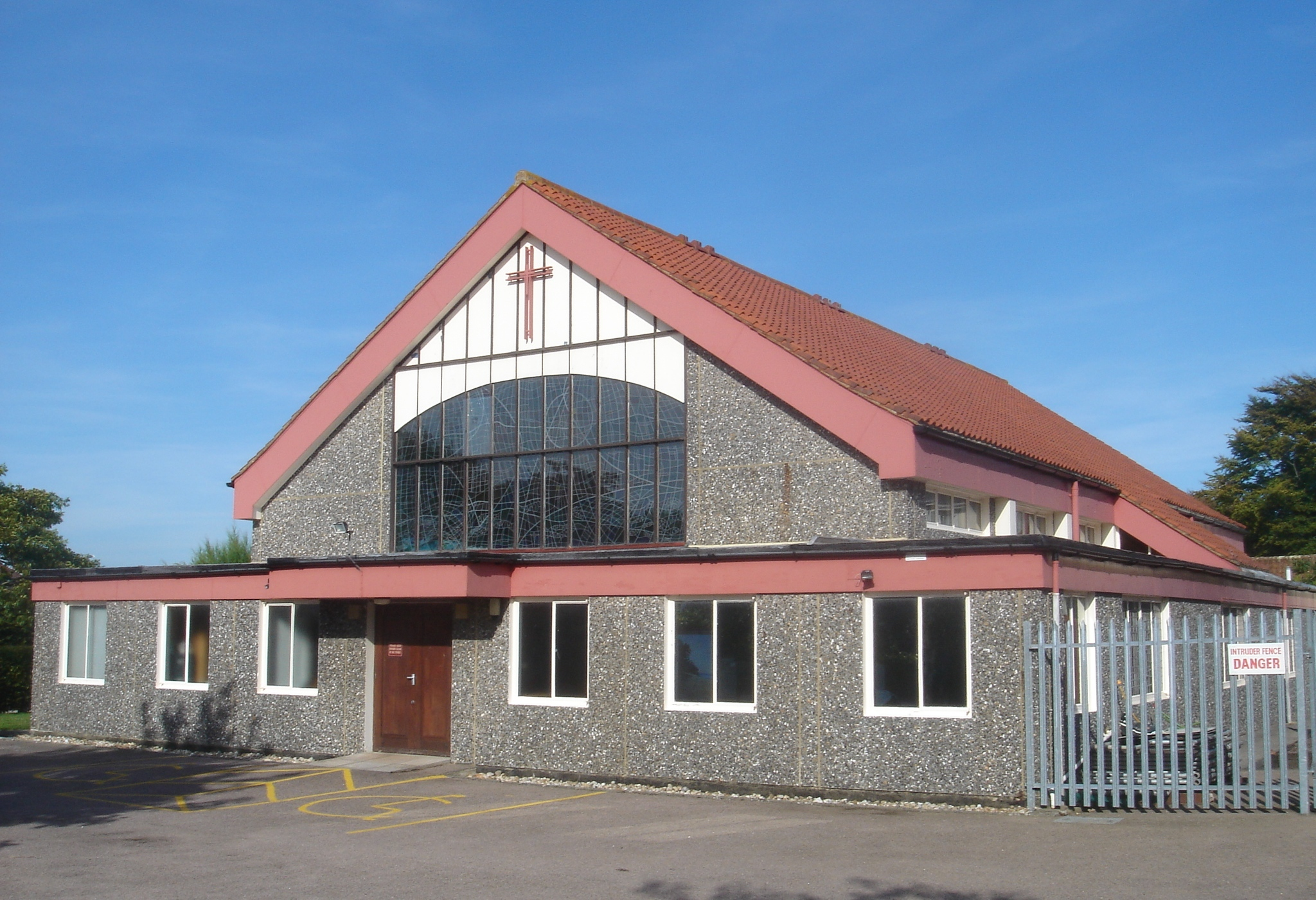
- The church from the northeast
- English Martyrs Catholic Church, Goring-by-Sea
- 50.8158°N 0.4277°W
- Denomination: Roman Catholic
- Website: english-martyrs.co.uk

History
- Status: Parish church
- Dedication: English Martyrs
- Consecrated: 1970

Architecture
- Functional status: Active
- Architectural type: Church, utilitarian
- Completed: 1968

Specifications
- Width: 13 metres (44 ft)

Administration
- Province: Southwark
- Diocese: Arundel & Brighton
- Deanery: Worthing

Clergy
- Priest: Fr Liam O'Connor

English Martyrs' Church is in Compton Avenue, Goring-by-Sea, Worthing, West Sussex, England. It is an active Roman Catholic parish church in the diocese of Arundel & Brighton and the Worthing deanery. Hand-painted by Gary Bevans over five and a half years, English Martyrs' Church has the only known reproduction of Michelangelo's Sistine Chapel ceiling, which has been described as "a marvel" and "astonishing".

== Reproduction of Sistine Chapel ceiling ==
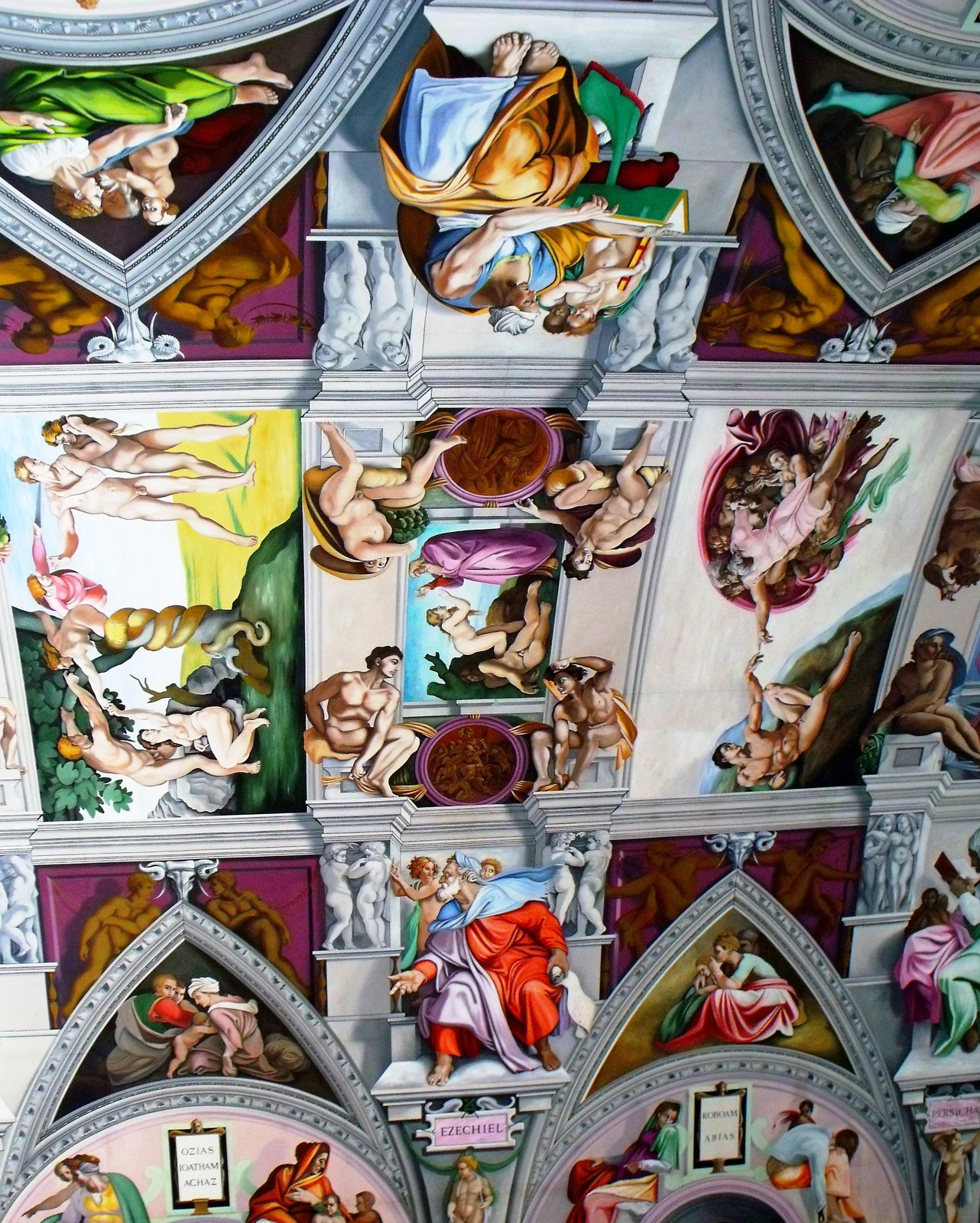
Part of the ceiling

Following a visit with his wife and children to the Sistine Chapel in Rome for the beatification of the English Martyrs in 1987, sign-painter Gary Bevans was inspired to paint a copy of the Sistine Chapel frescoes on the ceiling of English Martyrs' Church. The frescoes painted by Michelangelo on the ceiling of the Sistine Chapel from 1508 are regarded as one of the major artistic accomplishments of human civilisation. Bevans realised that English Martyrs' Church is the same width as the Sistine Chapel in Rome, and slightly shorter in length. Bevans had already produced works of art for the church. These included images of two of the English Martyrs - St Thomas More and St John Fisher, and a painting of the Last Supper which unusually includes Mary on Jesus' left, a young child and a Yorkshire Terrier.

Having secured the backing of the parish priest he received permission from the bishop of Arundel and Brighton, Cormac Murphy-O'Connor and began work later in 1987. Bevans completed the painting of the ceiling in 1993, five and a half years later. Bevans completed the works by himself, working in the evening and at weekends, in addition to his full-time job. The medium used for the painting is acrylic, on a white ground, applied to a vaulted wooden ceiling fixed to the church roof.

The church also has a stained glass west window, by Annie Goodman, installed in 1990, as well as Irish coloured glass in the clerestory.

== Adjoining barn ==
Next to the church lies the barn that is used as a church hall. Built in 1771 for George Jupp, a local farmer, the barn with its outbuildings was designated as a Grade II listed building on 31 January 1989. In December 1937 the barn was in a derelict state when it was bought with adjoining land and turned into a chapel, with priests from St Mary of the Angels in the centre of Worthing saying mass. When the new parish was created in 1952 the barn was used as a church until it was replaced by the present church building.

== Bibliography ==
- Coughlan, Robert (1966). The World of Michelangelo. Time-Life International.
- Gardner, Helen (1970). Art through the Ages. Harcourt, Brace and World. ISBN 978-0-15-508315-8.
- Hughes, Wendy (2017). The A-Z of Curious Sussex: Strange Stories of Mysteries, Crimes and Eccentrics. The History Press. ISBN 9780750986434.
- Williamson, Elizabeth; Hudson, Tim; Musson, Jeremy; Nairn, Ian; Pevsner, Nikolaus (2019). Sussex: West. Pevsner Architectural Guides: Buildings of England. Yale University Press. ISBN 9780300225211.
