= Titnore Wood =

Ancient woodland

Coordinates: 50.8352°N 0.4417°W

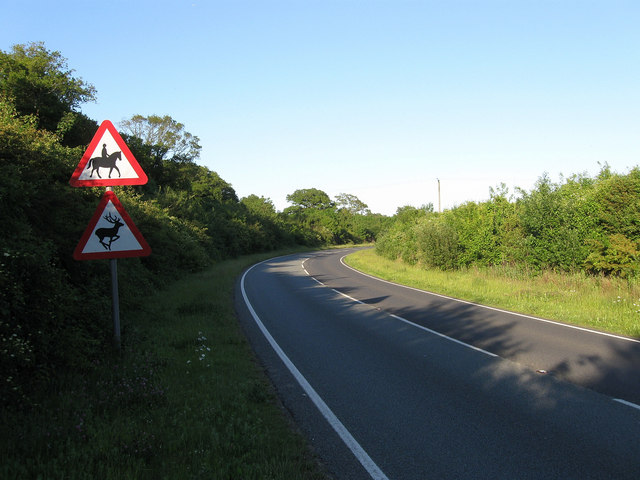
- Titnore Wood extends east of Titnore Lane in the north-west of Worthing
- Interactive map of Titnore Wood

Geography
- Location: West Sussex, England

Ecology
- Dominant tree species: Oak, ash, silver birch, field maple, hazel and common hawthorn
- Fauna: Mole, shrew, dormouse, bank vole, woodmouse, grey squirrel, weasel, fox

Titnore Wood is an area of semi-natural ancient woodland to the north-west of Worthing in West Sussex. With neighbouring Goring Wood it forms one of the last remaining blocks of ancient woodland on the West Sussex coastal plain.

Since 2006 land in and around the wood has been the site of a proposed major urban extension to the Worthing suburb of West Durrington. The proposed development prompted environmental protestors to tree-sit within the wood since May 2006. Since then Worthing Borough Council has agreed to a substantial new housing development just to the east of the woods themselves, as an extension of Durrington. This includes a new school, doctors surgery and around 2000 new houses on agricultural land.

Titnore wood is a Site of Nature Conservation Interest, as is neighbouring Goring Wood and Highdown Hill. Much of the site lies within the boundaries of the new South Downs National Park.

== Location ==
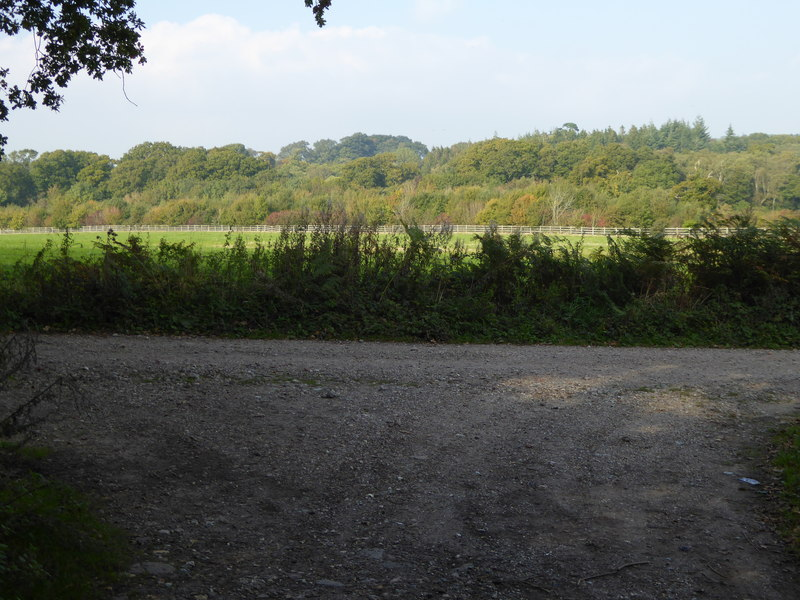
Titnore Wood

Titnore wood lies to the north-west of Worthing, a large town on the coast of West Sussex. The wood was formerly part of the Castle Goring estate, a grade I listed country house built at the end of the 18th century for Sir Bysshe Shelley, grandfather of the poet Percy Bysshe Shelley. Titnore wood lies to the east of Titnore Lane, an ancient droveway from the coastal plain onto the South Downs. To the south of the wood lies a lake, known as Titnore Lake or Castle Goring Lake. The lake is fed by streams from surrounding farmland which in turn feeds the Ferring Rife which flows into the English Channel at Ferring.

== Proposed development ==
In 2003 a new greenfield development was put forward for 875 homes by the West Durrington Consortium, a group made of Heron Corporation, Bryant Homes (part of Taylor Woodrow) and Persimmon Homes. The proposal required the loss of around 275 trees including some from the proposal to straighten Titnore Lane to improve the flow of traffic. In May 2006 a group of around 25 environmentalist protesters squatted the wood, constructing tree houses and a network of tunnels. In July 2006, the landowner was granted a possession order from the High Court to remove the protesters. In March 2010 councillors at Worthing Borough Council voted unanimously to reject the development plans.

== Flora and fauna ==
Oak and ash are the predominant species in the wood. There are frequent silver birch, field maple, hazel and common hawthorn. Mammals include mole, shrew, dormouse, bank vole, woodmouse, grey squirrel, least weasel, red fox, as well as various bat species. Species of bat which can be found in the wood including the pipistrelle bat, serotine bat, Natterer's bat, noctule bat and long-eared bat. Species of bird found include Eurasian jay, common pheasant, common chaffinch, carrion crow, woodpigeon, robin, chiffchaff, wren, magpie, dunnock, great spotted woodpecker, lesser spotted woodpecker, Eurasian treecreeper, tawny owl, common kestrel, great tit, long-tailed tit, blackbird, Eurasian nuthatch and whitethroat.
