= Durrington-on-Sea railway station =

Railway station in West Sussex, England

Coordinates: 50°49′03″N 0°24′40″W

Durrington-on-Sea
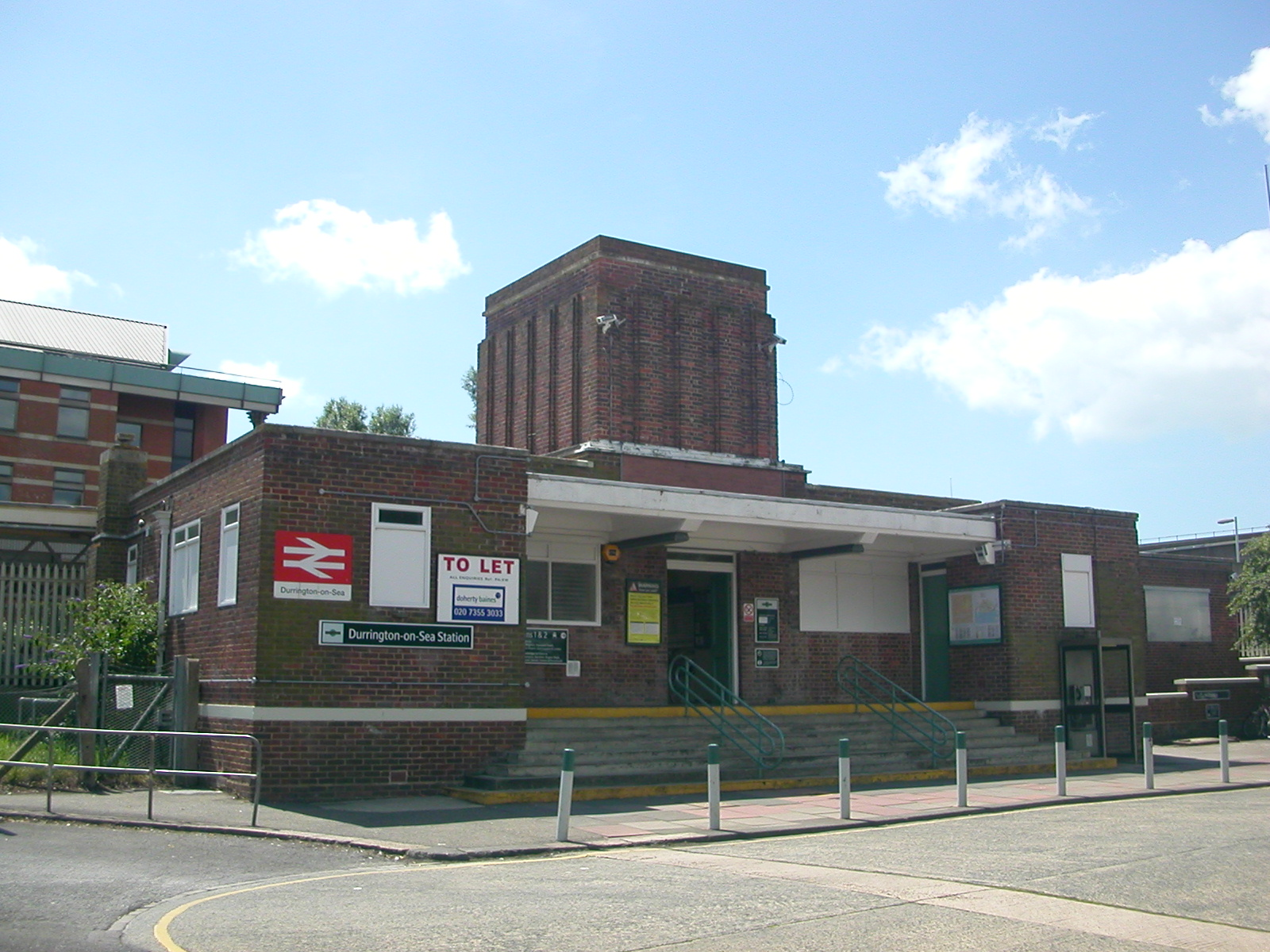

General information
- Location: Goring, Worthing, West Sussex; England
- Grid reference: TQ120031
- Manager: Southern
- Platforms: 2

Other information
- Station code: DUR
- Classification: DfT category E

History
- Opened: 4 July 1937

Passengers
- 2020/21: ▼0.143 million
- 2021/22: ▲0.354 million
- 2022/23: ▲0.427 million
- 2023/24: ▲0.437 million
- 2024/25: ▲0.507 million
Location
Notes
- Passenger statistics from the Office of Rail and Road

Durrington-on-Sea railway station is in Goring, a suburb of Worthing in the county of West Sussex. It is 12 miles 13 chains (19.6 km) down the line from Brighton. The station is operated by Southern.

Durrington-on-Sea railway station lies about 1.3 miles (2.1 km) south of the Worthing suburb of Durrington.

It was designed in the Modernist style by the architect to the Southern Railway, James Robb Scott and opened on 4 July 1937. The architecture and design of station has drawn criticism from a local newspaper as the "grimmest stop in the South". Owners (Network Rail) and operator (Southern), refute claims of problems and cite lack of central government funding to rebuild stations. Facilities at the station are limited and there are no toilets. There is a waiting room on platform 1, which opened in 2022.

== Accessibility ==
There is step free access available from the street outside the main entrance to platform 1 (for services to London and Brighton) is available via the side gate. There is a footbridge with steps to platform 2 (services to Littlehampton and Portsmouth). Entrance to the ticket office is by steps from the street, although step-free access is possible via platform 1. In September 2008, the rear entrance direct to platform 2 was adapted for step free access.

== Services ==
All services at Durrington-on-Sea are operated by Southern using Class 377 EMUs.

The typical off-peak service in trains per hour is:

- 2 tph to London Victoria via Gatwick Airport
- 2 tph to Brighton
- 2 tph to Littlehampton
- 1 tph to Chichester via Littlehampton
- 1 tph to Portsmouth & Southsea

During the peak hours on Mondays to Thursdays, there is an additional peak-hour service per day between London Bridge and Littlehampton.

On Sundays, the service to Portsmouth & Southsea is extended to Portsmouth Harbour, services between Littlehampton and London Victoria are reduced to hourly, the service to Chichester via Littlehampton does not run, and the station is served by an additional hourly service to Southampton Central.

Preceding station	National Rail	Following station
West Worthing	Southern West Coastway Line	Goring-by-Sea
