= Sing Street (musical) =

2016 musical by Gary Clark and John Carney

- Music: Gary Clark; John Carney
- Lyrics: Gary Clark; John Carney
- Book: Enda Walsh
- Basis: Sing Street by John Carney; Simon Carmody
- Productions: 2019 Off-Broadway; 2022 Boston

Sing Street is a musical with music and lyrics by Gary Clark and John Carney and a book by Enda Walsh. The musical is based on Carney's 2016 film of the same name. The stage adaptation was originally presented at New York Theatre Workshop. Directed by Rebecca Taichman and produced by Barbara Broccoli, Brian Carmody, Patrick Milling-Smith, Michael Wilson, Orin Wolf, and Frederick Zollo, the musical was initially set to premiere on Broadway at the Lyceum Theatre in previews on March 26, 2020, and officially on April 19 with the same cast, but was ultimately delayed due to the COVID-19 pandemic. Nevertheless, a cast recording featuring the original Broadway cast was released on April 22, 2020. The show was presented by the Huntington Theatre Company in Boston in the fall of 2022, with plans to move to Broadway.

== Overview ==
The musical takes place in 1982, in Dublin, Republic of Ireland.

== Productions ==
=== Off-Broadway (2019) and cancelled Broadway production (2020) ===
Sing Street, like Carney's film Once, was adapted for the stage as a musical, also called Sing Street. The screenplay was adapted by Enda Walsh (who also wrote the book for the musical Once) and the production was directed by Rebecca Taichman. The show opened at New York Theatre Workshop on December 16, 2019, after extensive workshops and three weeks of preview performances. The production closed on January 26, 2020, with initial plans to transfer to the Lyceum Theatre on Broadway in the following March with the cast intact. However, the production was postponed due to the shutdown of Broadway theaters. Although this iteration of the production never opened on Broadway, an original Broadway cast recording was released.

=== Boston (2022) ===
A second production ran at Boston's Calderwood Pavilion, presented by The Huntington Theatre in association with Sing Street Broadway LLC. The run, which began on August 26 and concluded on October 9, 2022, once again has direction by Rebecca Taichman, choreography by Sonya Tayeh, and set design by Bob Crowley. Costume design was by Crowley and Lisa Zinni, lighting design was by Natasha Katz, sound design was by Peter Hylenski, video design were by Luke Halls and Brad Peterson, Wigs/Hair and Makeup are by Tommy Kurzman.

=== London (2025) ===
On October 8, 2024, producer Barbara Broccoli announced that Sing Street would play the Lyric Theatre, Hammersmith in London in Summer 2025, with hopes for an eventual West End transfer. Taichman will once again direct, joined by much of the team from the Huntington production including choreographer Tayeh.

== Characters and original cast ==
Character	Workshop	Off-Broadway	Boston	Off-West End
Character	2019		2022	2025
Darren Mulvey	Max Bartos	Max Bartos	Diego Lucano	Cameron Hogan
Gary	Brendan C. Callahan	Brendan C. Callahan	Michael Lepore	Indiana Hawkes
Robert Lalor	Billy Carter	Billy Carter	Billy Carter	Lochlann Ó Mearáin
Raphina	Zara Devlin	Zara Devlin	Courtnee Carter	Grace Collender
Brendan Lalor	Gus Halper	Gus Halper	Dónal Finn	Adam Hunter
Larry	Jakeim Hart	Jakeim Hart	Elijah Lyons	Seb Robinson
Brother Baxter	Martin Moran	Martin Moran	Armand Schultz	Lloyd Hutchinson
Sandra	Anne L. Nathan	Anne L. Nathan	Anne L. Nathan	Jenny Fitzpatrick
Barry	Johnny Newcomb	Johnny Newcomb	Jack DiFalco	Jack James Ryan
Conor Lalor	Brenock O'Connor	Brenock O'Connor	Adam Bregman	Sheridan Townsley
Kevin	Gian Perez	Gian Perez	Gian Perez	Harry Curley
Eamon	Sam Poon	Sam Poon	Ben Wang	Jesse Nyakudya
Declan	Anthony Genovesi	Anthony Genovesi	Anthony Genovesi	Matthew Philp
Anne Lalor	Skyler Volpe	Skyler Volpe	Alexa Xioufaridou Moster	Tateyana Arutura
Penny Lalor	Julia Murney	Amy Warren	Dee Roscioli	Lucianne McEvoy

== Musical numbers ==
New York Theatre Workshop

- "Just Can't Get Enough" – Conor
- "Riddle of the Model" – Conor
- "Up" – Conor
- "A Beautiful Sea" – Conor & Raphina
- "Girls" – Conor & Anne
- "Faith of Our Fathers" – Brother Baxter
- "Dream for You" – Conor
- "Drive It Like You Stole It" – Conor
- "Up (Down Version)" – Conor
- "Brown Shoes" – Conor & Barry
- "To Find You" – Conor
- "Go Now" – Brendan

Boston

- "Riddle of the Model" – Conor
- "Up" – Conor
- "Up (Reprise)" – Raphina
- "Go On" – Lalor Family
- "A Beautiful Sea" – Conor & Raphina
- "Girls" – Lalor Siblings
- "To Find You" – Conor
- "Drive It Like You Stole It" – Conor
- "Up (Down Version)" – Conor
- "Faith of Our Fathers" – Brother Baxter
- "Brown Shoes" – Conor, Eamon, Barry
- "To Find You (Reprise)" – Raphina & Conor
- "Go Now" – Brendan & Company

All songs are taken from the original film, except "Just Can't Get Enough", "Faith of Our Fathers", and "Dream for You".

== Awards and nominations ==
=== Original Off-Broadway production ===
Year	Award	Category	Nominee	Result
2020	Lucille Lortel Awards	Outstanding Featured Actor in a Musical	Gus Halper	Nominated
2020	Drama League Awards	Outstanding Production of a Musical		Nominated
2020	Drama League Awards	Distinguished Performance Award	Brenock O'Connor	Nominated
2020	Off-Broadway Alliance Awards	Best New Musical		Nominated
