= Ferring Rife =

Stream in West Sussex, England

Coordinates: 50°48′16″N 0°27′13″W

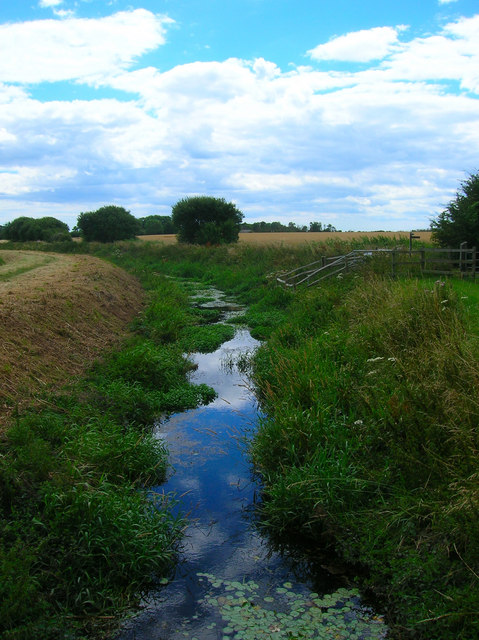
- Looking south along the Ferring Rife in 2008

Location
- Country: England
- Counties: West Sussex
- Towns/Cities: Worthing

Physical characteristics
- Source
  - location: West Durrington, Worthing, West Sussex, UK
- Mouth
  - location: Ferring, West Sussex, UK
  - elevation: 0 m (0 ft)

The Ferring Rife is a stream in West Sussex, England that rises in the West Durrington area of Worthing. It has multiple sources including one near Castle Goring and another in Titnore Wood. The streams converge that make up the Ferring Rife converge north of Littlehampton Road, passing through Maybridge, then west of Ferring into the sea. It flows south-west, west and then south into the English Channel, between the villages of Ferring and East Preston.

== Etymology ==
The word 'rife' is a Sussex dialect word for a stream, especially between Selsey and Worthing.

== See also ==
- Teville Stream
- List of rivers of England
