= St Mary's Church, Goring-by-Sea =

St Mary's Church
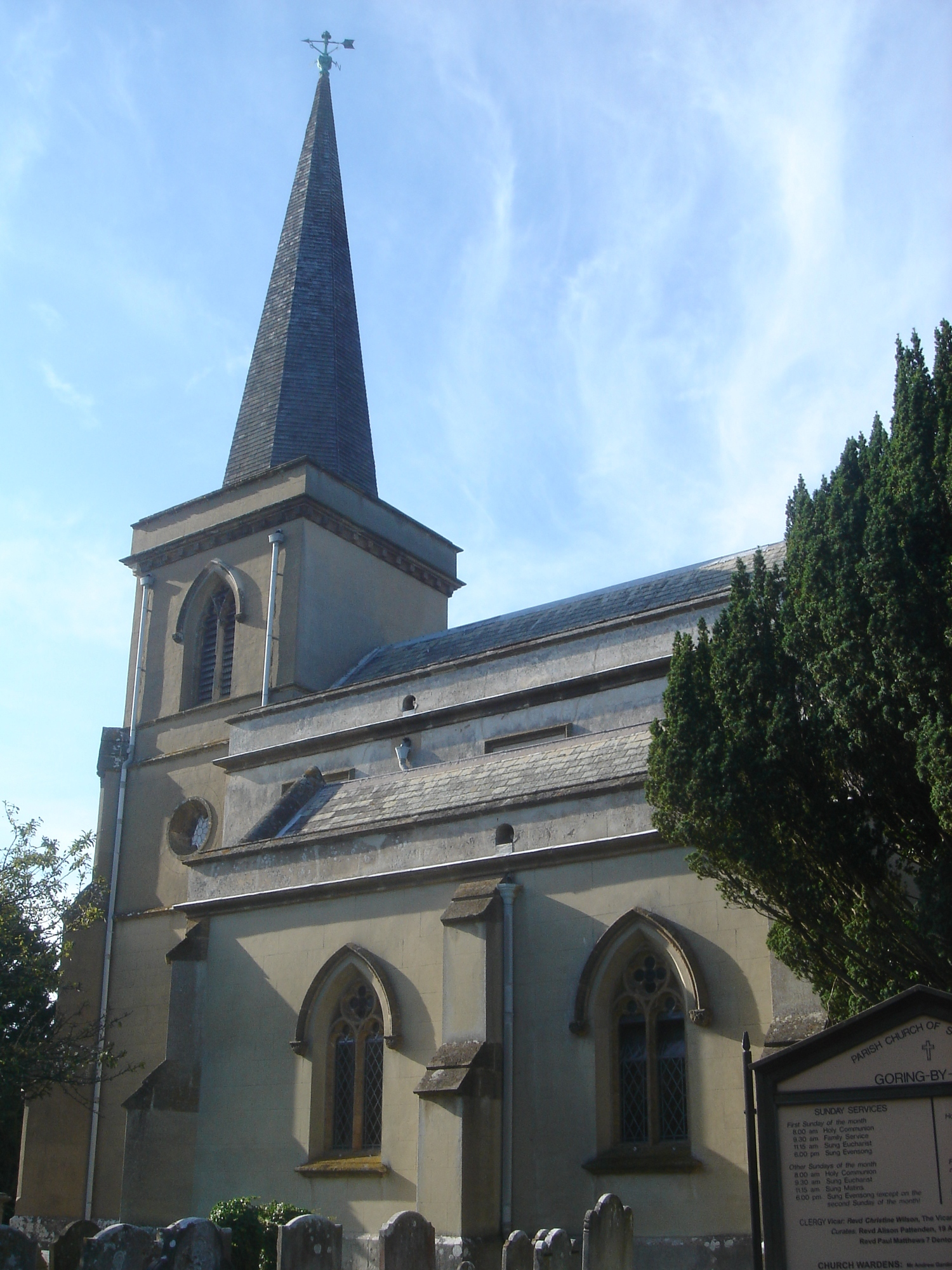
- The church from the southeast
- St Mary's Church
- 50.8130°N 0.4246°W
- Location: Sea Lane/Ilex Way, Goring-by-Sea, Worthing, West Sussex BN12 4UJ
- Country: England
- Denomination: Church of England
- Website: https://goringbyseaparish.org

History
- Status: Parish church
- Dedication: Mary, mother of Jesus

Architecture
- Functional status: Active
- Heritage designation: Grade II*
- Designated: 21 May 1976
- Architect: Decimus Burton
- Style: Gothic Revival; original parts Transitional Norman

Administration
- Province: Canterbury
- Diocese: Chichester
- Archdeaconry: Chichester
- Deanery: Rural Deanery of Worthing
- Parish: Goring-by-Sea, St Mary

Clergy
- Vicar: Rev. George Butler

St Mary's Church is an Anglican church in the Goring-by-Sea area of the Borough of Worthing, one of seven local government districts in the English county of West Sussex. The late Norman parish church of the ancient village of Goring retains some architectural elements from that period, but Decimus Burton's comprehensive restoration of 1837 has given the church its present Gothic Revival exterior appearance. German artist Hans Feibusch, who worked extensively in the Diocese of Chichester, provided a mural in 1954: it is considered impressive, but caused controversy at the time. English Heritage has listed the church at Grade II* for its architectural and historical importance.

== History ==
The parish of Goring existed at the time of the Domesday survey in 1086, under the name Garinges. Unlike the other parishes in the area covered by the present Borough of Worthing, which lay in the Rape of Bramber, it was part of the neighbouring Rape of Arundel. (Rapes were the six ancient subdivisions of the county of Sussex, each named after a castle and its associated town.) It incorporated four manors. The most important of these passed from the Earls of Arundel to Roger de Montalt, 1st Baron Montalt and several other holders. Intermittent residential development began in the 19th century and continued throughout the 20th century, especially after the old village became part of the Borough of Worthing in 1929. Since then it has developed into one of Worthing's main suburbs.

Some evidence exists for a Saxon-era place of worship in Goring, but this is not certain. A church on the present site, dedicated to Mary, was founded in the late 12th century. It was in regular use for worship thereafter, and apart from some additions in the 14th century it remained structurally unchanged until the intervention of David Lyon in 1836–1837. Lyon, a rich merchant, bought land and one of the manor houses in 1834, and set about transforming the area. As well as demolishing the manor house and building Goring Hall, a new mansion, he commissioned architect Decimus Burton to redesign St Mary's Church. The 12th-century building was partly demolished: Burton retained only the original arcades in the nave. Lyon paid for the reconstruction himself.

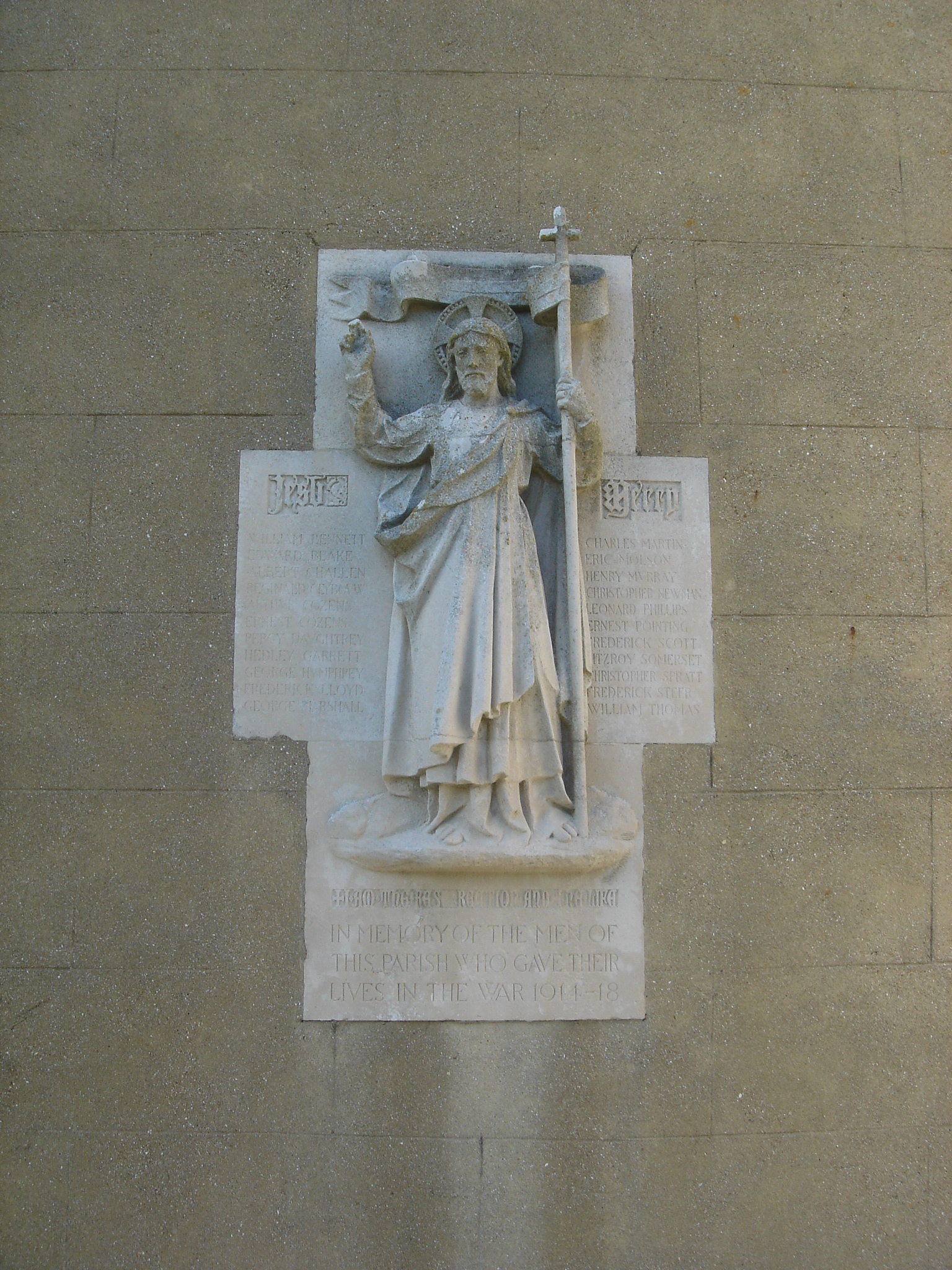
The World War I memorial on the south wall

A memorial to casualties of World War I, in the form of a sculpture of Jesus, was added on the south exterior wall in the early 20th century. In 1954, German artist and muralist Hans Feibusch, known to the then-incumbent Bishop of Chichester George Bell since 1940, was commissioned to design a mural for the chancel arch in the church. His design, representing Christ in Majesty, is well regarded—for example, Ian Nairn and Nikolaus Pevsner recorded that the "swirling, Baroque design" was "a good deal better" than other church decoration of the era—but its unveiling aroused strong feeling at diocesan level. Some traditionalist members of the diocesan advisory committee, perturbed by the boldness of the design (which included imagery described as "violently masculine and brutal"), raised their objections at the diocese's consistory court—a type of ecclesiastical court. Bishop Bell, who passed the judgement at the court, managed to settle the dispute, and the mural was unveiled in September 1954. The outcome of the court case has been described as being crucial to how art and the present-day Church of England interact and relate to each other.

== Architecture ==
Decimus Burton's design for St Mary's Church—described as "disappointingly limp" by Nairn and Pevsner—was simple Early English Gothic Revival. The surviving parts of the original nave are late Norman, from the "Transitional" period into Gothic architecture. Parts of the north and south interior walls were also retained, and fragments of the original chancel arch remain. There is a tower at the west end, topped with a tall spire and incorporating the entrance door, a nave with a galleried west end, a central chancel arch leading to a three-bay chancel, and a vestry to the northeast. A supplementary vestry was added to the north side in 1966. A separate church hall, built of brick, was erected in 1950. The church is clad in smooth grey render, relieved by stone quoins and dressings, and the roof is of slate. Buttresses support the chancel on the outside. The tower rises in three stages, of which the lower two are supported by corner buttresses. Above these, there is a belfry stage with lancet and round windows. A prominent parapet separates the belfry from the spire.

Inside, the 12th-century arcades show some remodelling, and the capitals at the top of the piers may be entirely Burton's work. The nave roof is rib-vaulted into six sections and is plastered; the chancel roof is similar. Both have ornate decoration on the beams and braces. The pulpit and pews date from a renovation of the interior in 1888. The windows on all sides of the church are Decorated Gothic-style lancets with either two or three panes, except for the much larger east window.

There are several monuments in various forms inside the church. The oldest, dating from about 1490, are a pair of 26-inch (66 cm) brass effigies of a husband and wife. A funerary hatchment dated 1860 commemorates Sir George Richard Brooke-Pechell, 4th Baronet, of the Pechell Baronetcy, who died in that year. A bust commemorating Susan Cook, who died in 1707, has been praised as "lively" and "full of femininity". A white marble sculpture created in 1841 by Francis Legatt Chantrey, commemorating Isabella Lyon (a relative of David Lyon), is considered less impressive but still of some merit.

The churchyard contains Commonwealth war graves of a Royal Naval Volunteer Reserve seaman and an Army Service Corps soldier of World War I.

== The church today ==
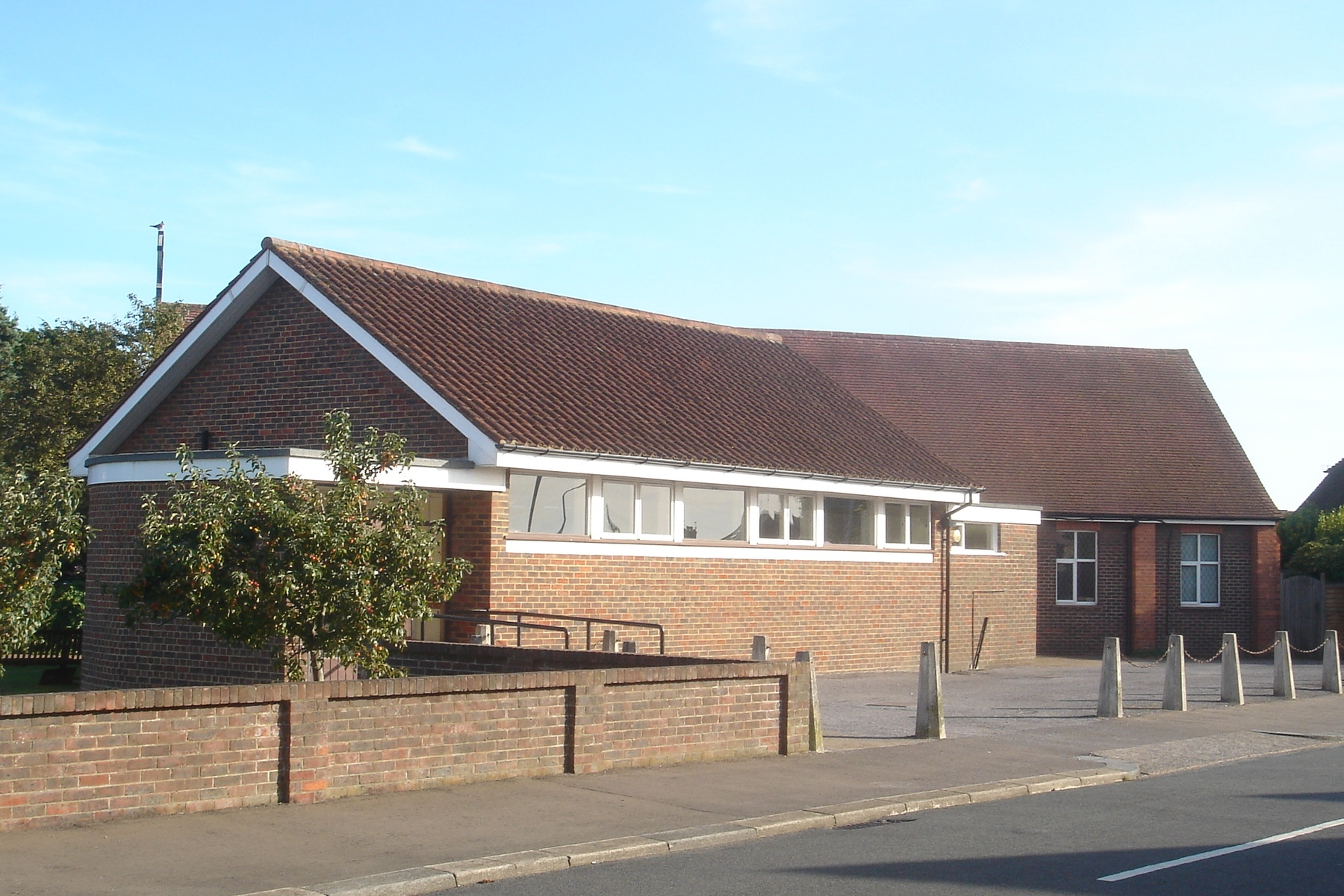
St Laurence's Church, in St Mary's parish, was dedicated in 1936.

St Mary's Church was listed at Grade II* by English Heritage on 21 May 1976. As of February 2001, it was one of eight Grade II*-listed buildings, and 213 listed buildings of all grades, in the Borough of Worthing. (These totals have since changed because of new listings and delistings.)

The parish covers a rectangular area in the southwest corner of the borough of Worthing, and includes a long, narrow strip to the northwest. The boundaries are the railway line to the north, George V Avenue to the east, the English Channel coast to the south and the borough boundary (where it adjoins the district of Arun) to the west. At the northwest corner, the parish boundary follows the borough boundary as far as its northwesternmost point at the A27/A280 road junction, and returns along Titnore Lane and Goring Street.

The parish has a second church in the southeast corner. St Laurence's Church was founded as a mission chapel in 1936 to serve residential development in the Sea Place area of Goring-by-Sea. A brick-built hall served worshippers until 1962, when another hall was added next to it. This was extended in 1969.

== See also ==
- List of places of worship in Worthing

== Bibliography ==
- Beevers, David; Marks, Richard; Roles, John (1989). Sussex Churches and Chapels. Brighton: The Royal Pavilion, Art Gallery and Museums. ISBN 0-948723-11-4.
- Delorme, Mary (1987). Curious Sussex. London: Robert Hale Ltd. ISBN 0-7090-2970-5.
- Elleray, D. Robert (1977). Worthing: a Pictorial History. Chichester: Phillimore & Co. ISBN 0-85033-263-X.
- Elleray, D. Robert (1998). A Millennium Encyclopaedia of Worthing History. Worthing: Optimus Books. ISBN 0-9533132-0-4.
- Elleray, D. Robert (2004). Sussex Places of Worship. Worthing: Optimus Books. ISBN 0-9533132-7-1.
- Nairn, Ian; Pevsner, Nikolaus (1965). The Buildings of England: Sussex. Harmondsworth: Penguin Books. ISBN 0-14-071028-0.
- Vaughan, John (1993). Goring and Ferring Past and Present. Goring-by-Sea: Photrack. ISBN 0-9522190-1-8.
