= Angmering railway station =

Railway station in West Sussex, England

Angmering
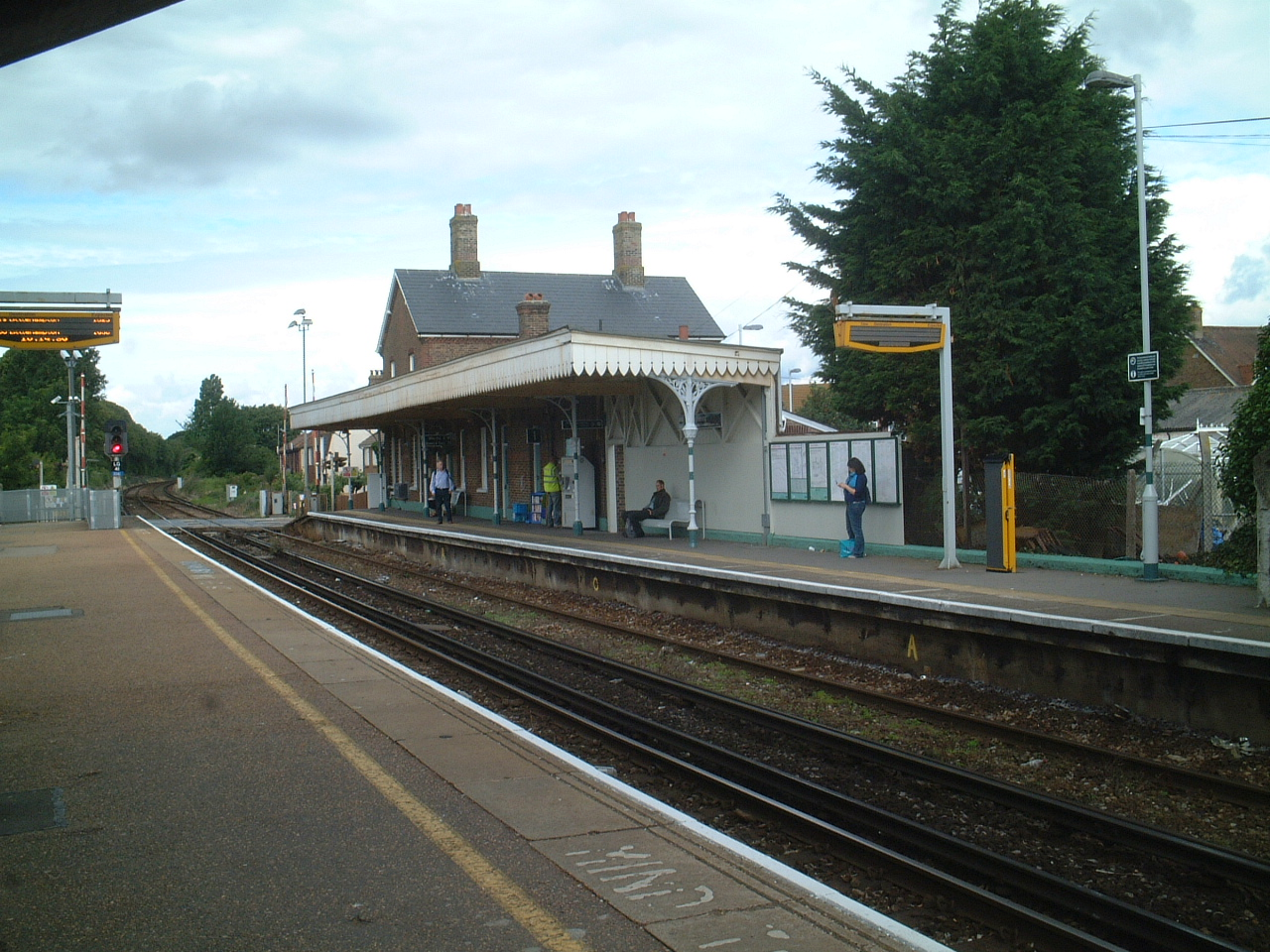
- The main station building and platform one, as seen looking west from platform two (June 2007)

General information
- Location: East Preston, Arun District, England
- Coordinates: 50°48′59″N 0°29′21″W
- Grid reference: TQ065029
- Owner: Network Rail
- Manager: Southern
- Platforms: 2

Other information
- Station code: ANG
- Classification: DfT category E

History
- Opened: 16 March 1846

Passengers
- 2020/21: ▼0.291 million
- 2021/22: ▲0.677 million
- 2022/23: ▲0.734 million
- 2023/24: ▼0.720 million
- 2024/25: ▲0.843 million
Location
Notes
- Passenger statistics from the Office of Rail and Road

Angmering is a railway station that serves Angmering, Rustington and East Preston, in West Sussex, England; it is situated about 0.6 miles (1 km) away from the centre of Angmering village. It is a stop on the West Coastway Line and lies 15 miles 44 chains (15.6 mi; 25.0 km) down the line from Brighton.

== History ==
Angmering station was opened by the Brighton and Chichester Railway in March 1846, which soon became part of the London, Brighton and South Coast Railway in July 1846. it became part of the Southern Railway during the Grouping of 1923. The line then passed on to the Southern Region of British Railways on nationalisation in 1948.

When sectorisation was introduced, the station was served by Network SouthEast until the privatisation of British Rail.

=== Former services ===
Until December 2007, South West Trains services passed through the station while running four trains per day to Brighton; however, these did not call at Angmering.

Until May 2022, one Great Western Railway service from Portsmouth Harbour to Brighton called at Angmering.

== Facilities ==
There is a ticket office, a waiting room, toilets, buffet, car park, taxi rank and bicycle storage.

== Services ==
All services at Angmering are operated by Southern, using Class 377 electric multiple units.

The typical off-peak service in trains per hour (tph) is:

- 2 tph to London Victoria, via Gatwick Airport
- 4 tph to Brighton
- 2 tph to Littlehampton
- 1 tph to Portsmouth & Southsea
- 1 tph to Chichester, via Littlehampton
- 2 tph to Southampton Central.

During peak hours, the station is served by a small number of direct trains between Brighton and Littlehampton, as well as a single peak hour service per day between London Bridge and Littlehampton.

Preceding station	National Rail	Following station
Goring-by-Sea or Worthing	Southern West Coastway Line	Ford or Barnham
Goring-by-Sea	Southern West Coastway Line Littlehampton Branch	Littlehampton

== Deaths ==
- A local woman, Maureen Weselby, committed suicide by jumping in front of a Brighton-bound express, operated by South West Trains, in May 2006.
- A local teenager, Adam Blackwood, was killed here when a Littlehampton-bound Southern train approaching the station knocked him down at a nearby pedestrian level crossing in early 2007.
- Another local, 16-year-old Megan Moore of Angmering, was killed after being dragged under the 22:17 London Victoria to Bognor Regis train just before midnight on 21 November 2009.

== Gallery ==
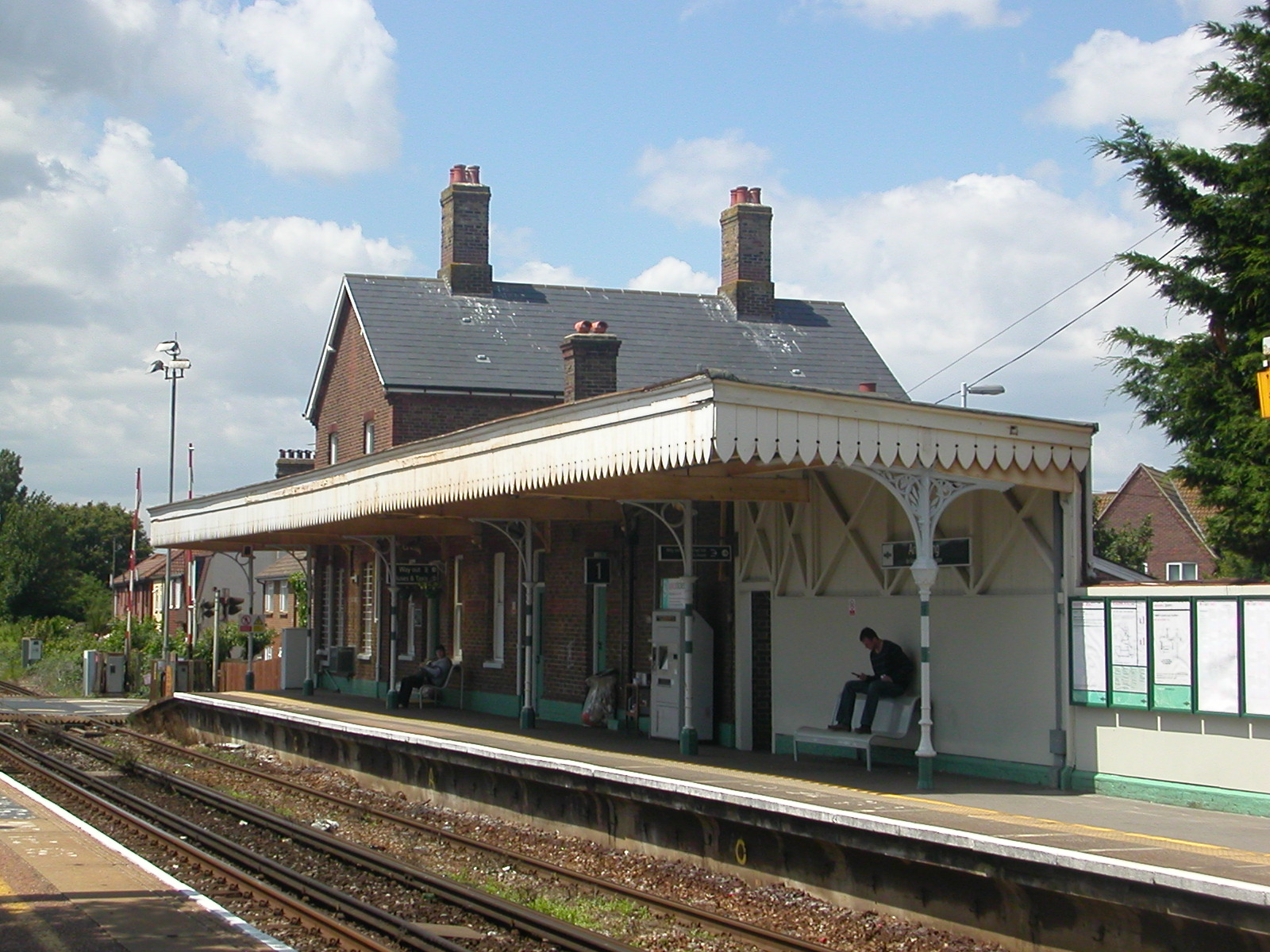
Closer view of the main station building and level crossing beyond.

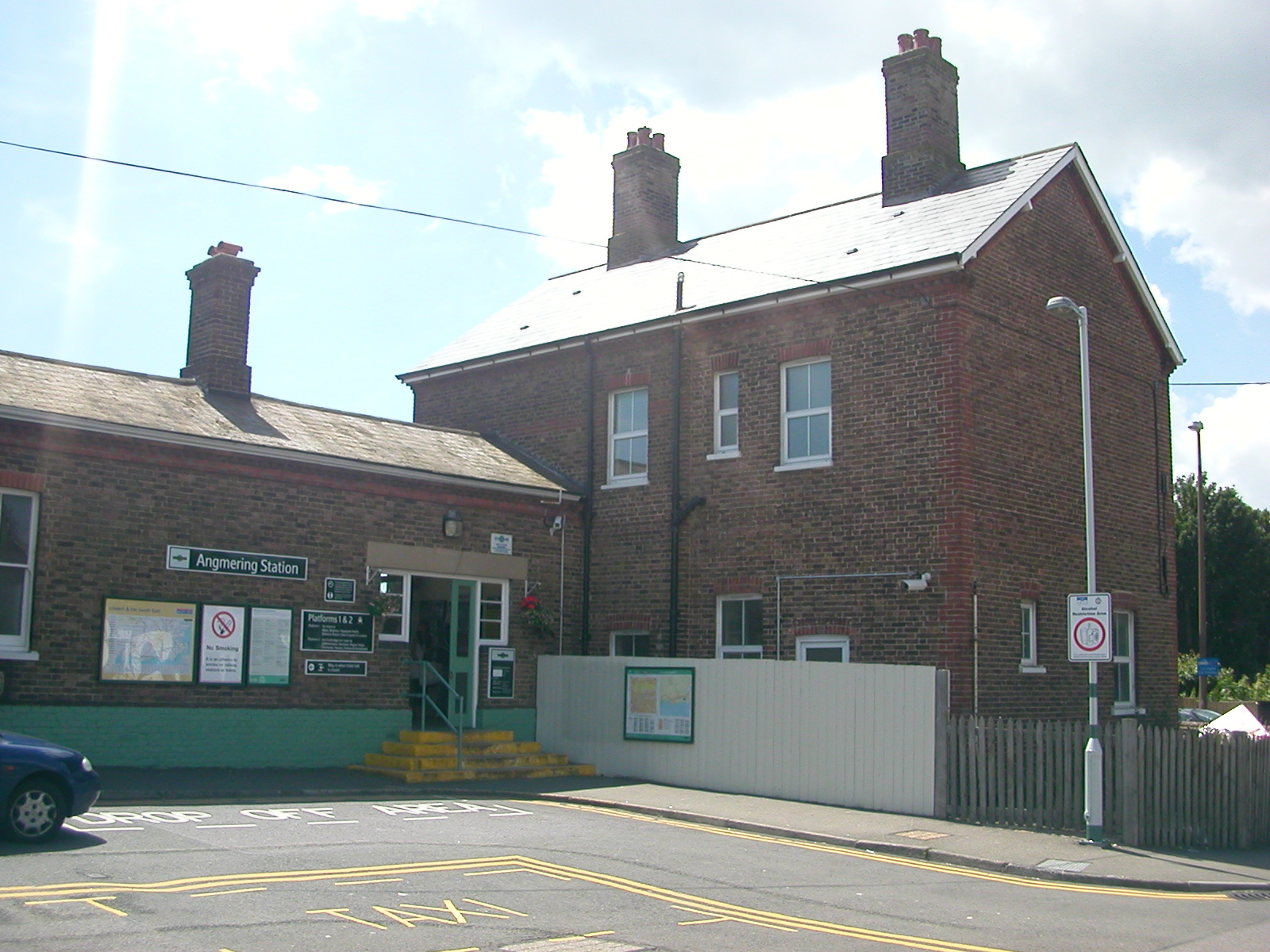
The ticket office building and former station house, from the forecourt.

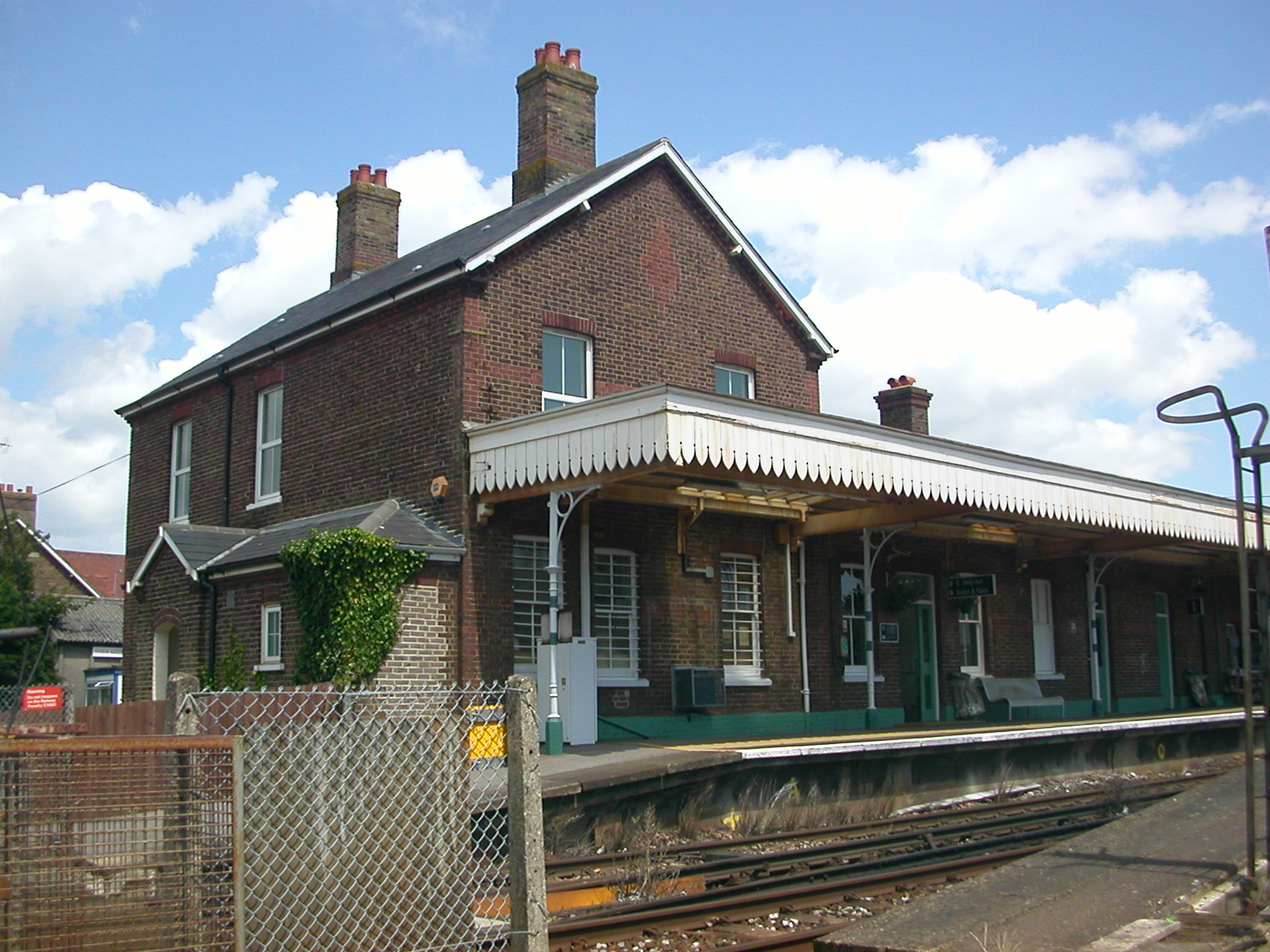
The substantial former station house, looking north from the level crossing.
