= St Oscar Romero Catholic School =

Location
- Goring Street; Goring-by-Sea; Worthing, West Sussex, BN12 5AF; England; 50.81606°N 0.43361°W

Information
- Former names: St Mary's Catholic Secondary Modern School (1957—1959); Blessed Robert Southwell Catholic Secondary Modern School (1959—1973); Chatsmore Catholic High School (1973—2020)
- Type: Voluntary aided school
- Religious affiliation: Roman Catholic
- Established: 1957 (as St Mary's Catholic Secondary Modern School)
- Local authority: West Sussex County Council
- Department for Education URN: 126096 Tables
- Ofsted: Reports
- Governing chair: Chris Silk
- Headteacher: Pete Byrne
- Staff: 100+
- Gender: Coeducational
- Age: 11 to 18
- Enrolment: 1072
- Colours: Red, Blue, Black, Purple, Green
- Website: stromeros.co.uk

St Oscar Romero Catholic School (formerly Chatsmore Catholic High School; formerly Blessed Robert Southwell High School) is a coeducational Roman Catholic secondary school located in the Goring-by-Sea area of Worthing, West Sussex, England.

It is a voluntary aided school administered by West Sussex County Council and the Roman Catholic Diocese of Arundel and Brighton. The school is named after Archbishop Óscar Romero.

== Óscar Romero ==
Óscar Arnulfo Romero y Galdámez was a bishop of the Catholic Church in El Salvador and became the fourth Archbishop of San Salvador, succeeding Luis Chávez. He was assassinated on March 24, 1980.

After his assassination, Romero was succeeded by Monsignor Arturo Rivera y Damas. In 1997, a cause for beatification and canonisation was opened for Romero, and Pope John Paul II bestowed upon him the title of Servant of God. His canonisation was finalised in 2018. He is considered by some of the unofficial patron saint of the Americas and El Salvador and is often referred to as San Romero by Catholics in El Salvador. Outside of Catholicism, Romero is honoured by other religious denominations of Christendom, including the Church of England through the Calendar in Common Worship. He is one of the ten 20th-century martyrs who are depicted in statues above the Great West Door of Westminster Abbey in London. In 2008, he was chosen as one of the 15 Champions of World Democracy by the Europe-based magazine A Different View.

== Controversies ==
In 2008, the school banned the drink Red Bull as it believed that the drink had an adverse effect on the behaviour of the pupils.

In 2019, a teacher was suspended after telling 14-year-old girls to take condoms on a school trip.

== Notable former pupils ==
- Brenock O'Connor, actor
- Leo Sayer, singer
