= David Lyon (British politician) =

British parliamentarian, died 1872

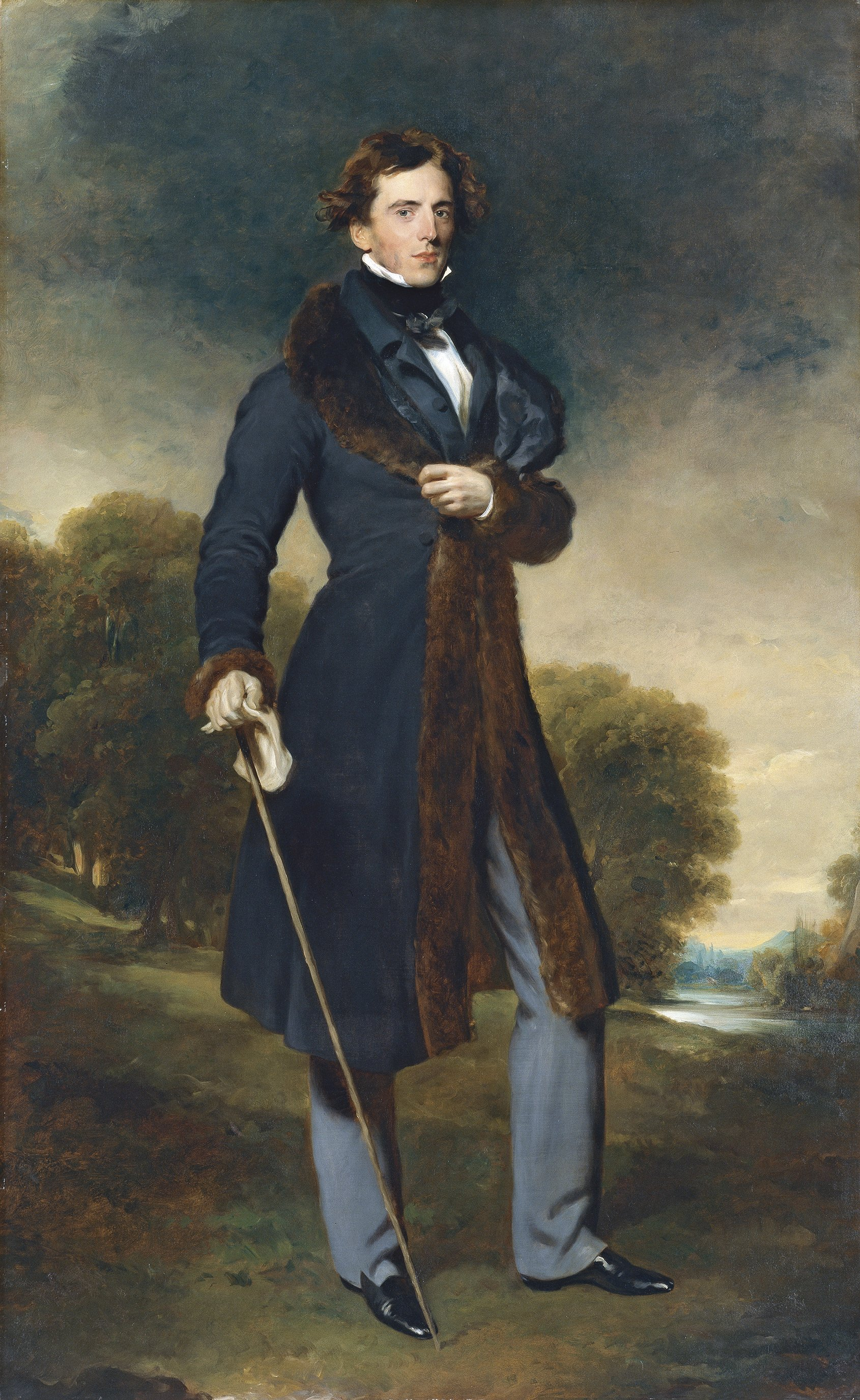
- The Thyssen Portrait of Lyon by Thomas Lawrence
- Born: 18 September 1794
- Died: 8 April 1872 (aged 77); Nice, France
- Occupation: Parliamentarian

David Lyon Junior (1794–1872) was a West Indies merchant, Member of parliament, and landowner. His portrait was painted by Sir Thomas Lawrence c. 1825, and is now in the Museum Thyssen-Bornemisza in Madrid.

== Background ==
David Lyon senior (1754–1827) was a successful West Indies merchant. He was descended from William Lyon of Pettanys (1433–1498) progenitor of the Easter Ogil branch (Burkes L.G. 1906), 3rd son of Patrick Lyon 1st Lord Glamis (1402–1459). With his wife Isabella Read (1776–1836) he had ten children, of whom David was the third, born on 8 April 1872. David junior was educated at Harrow (1809). In 1825, aged 31, his portrait was painted by Sir Thomas Lawrence, then president of the Royal Academy and at the peak of his career. Lawrence was paid for the painting in 1828, which would seem to have cost the high sum of 700 guineas. His father, David Lyon senior, also had his portrait painted by Lawrence, but the whereabouts of this portrait is unknown. Below is the painting of David Lyon Senior.

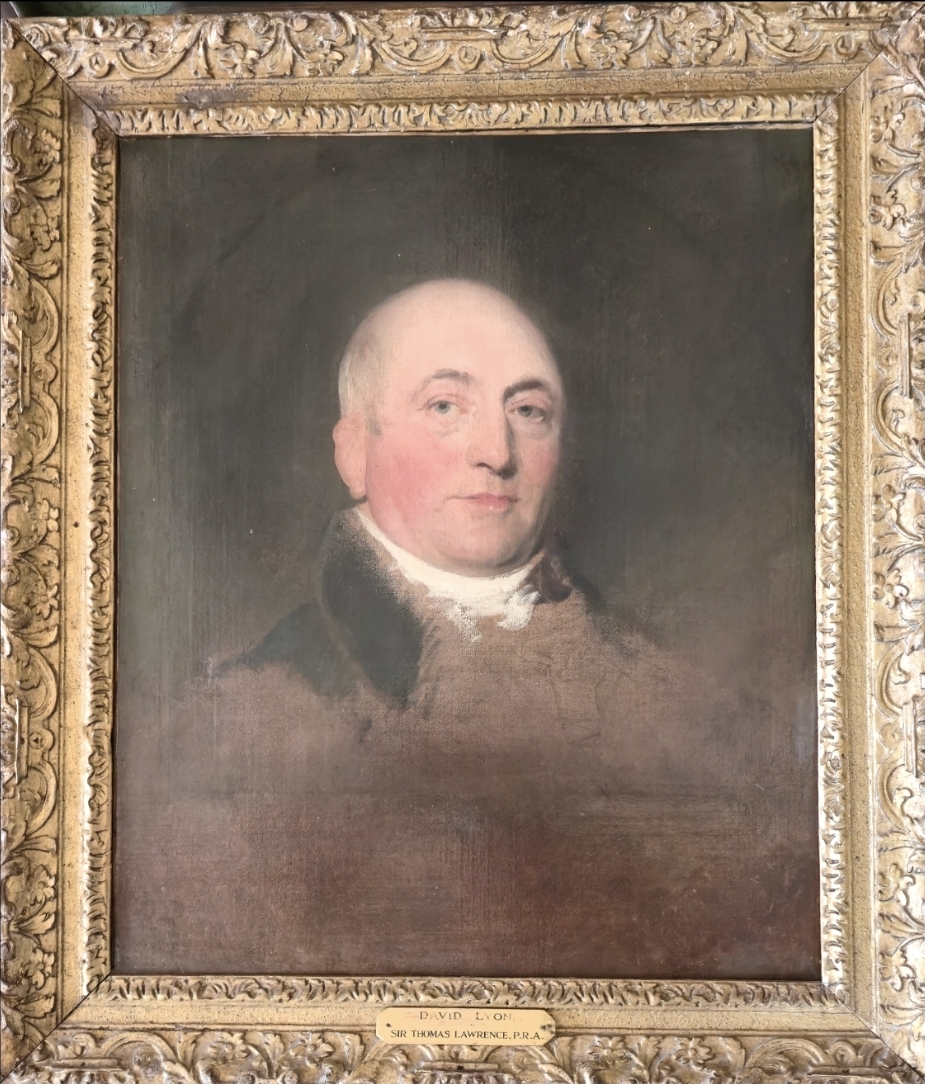
Painting done by Sir Thomas Lawrence

== Career ==
Lyon Junior was a Tory Member of Parliament for Bere Alston, a so-called rotten borough, controlled by Lord Beverley. He never spoke in Parliament, and, after the Reform Act disenfranchised Bere Alston, never returned to office. David Lyon junior joined the family business and had large interests in Jamaica. He was a slave owner, until the abolishment of slavery in 1833, when he was compensated for over two thousand slaves, held on thirteen estates. Two years after retiring from Parliament, he bought an estate near Worthing, Sussex. He pulled down the existing manor house and built Goring Hall, now in use as a hospital. In 1836 he commissioned architect Decimus Burton to redesign St Mary's Church at his expense. He employed Sir Francis Chantrey to sculpt a memorial to his mother in 1836 and planted a mile-long avenue of Holm Oaks, known as Ilex Avenue. Around this time he also built Highdown Tower, then known as the Dower House.

In 1848, aged 54, he married Blanche Augusta Bury, daughter of Edward Bury and Lady Charlotte Bury, the last being a celebrated novelist in her time. As a dutiful son-in-law he seems to have settled all her debts, and Lady Charlotte lived with the couple, who appeared to be very happy, at least to Benjamin Disraeli. David is portrayed as a "celebrated yachter" and a "very rich" man. Lyon became High Sheriff of Sussex in 1851.

Ten years after their marriage, the couple was involved in an acrimonious and very public quarrel. Blanche took her husband to court to claim "restitution of conjugal rights". The case was arranged out of court and "Mrs. Lyon went home to her husband". But a year later, the same paper carries the announcement by David that she is absenting herself without cause from his house and will not honour any debts she made. She retaliates by announcing this is because of 'his conduct towards her'.

In 1860 David Lyon bought Balintore Castle in Angus, the county of his forebears. Apart from his two country estates, David Lyon owned a London house at 31 South Street, Park Lane.

== Death ==
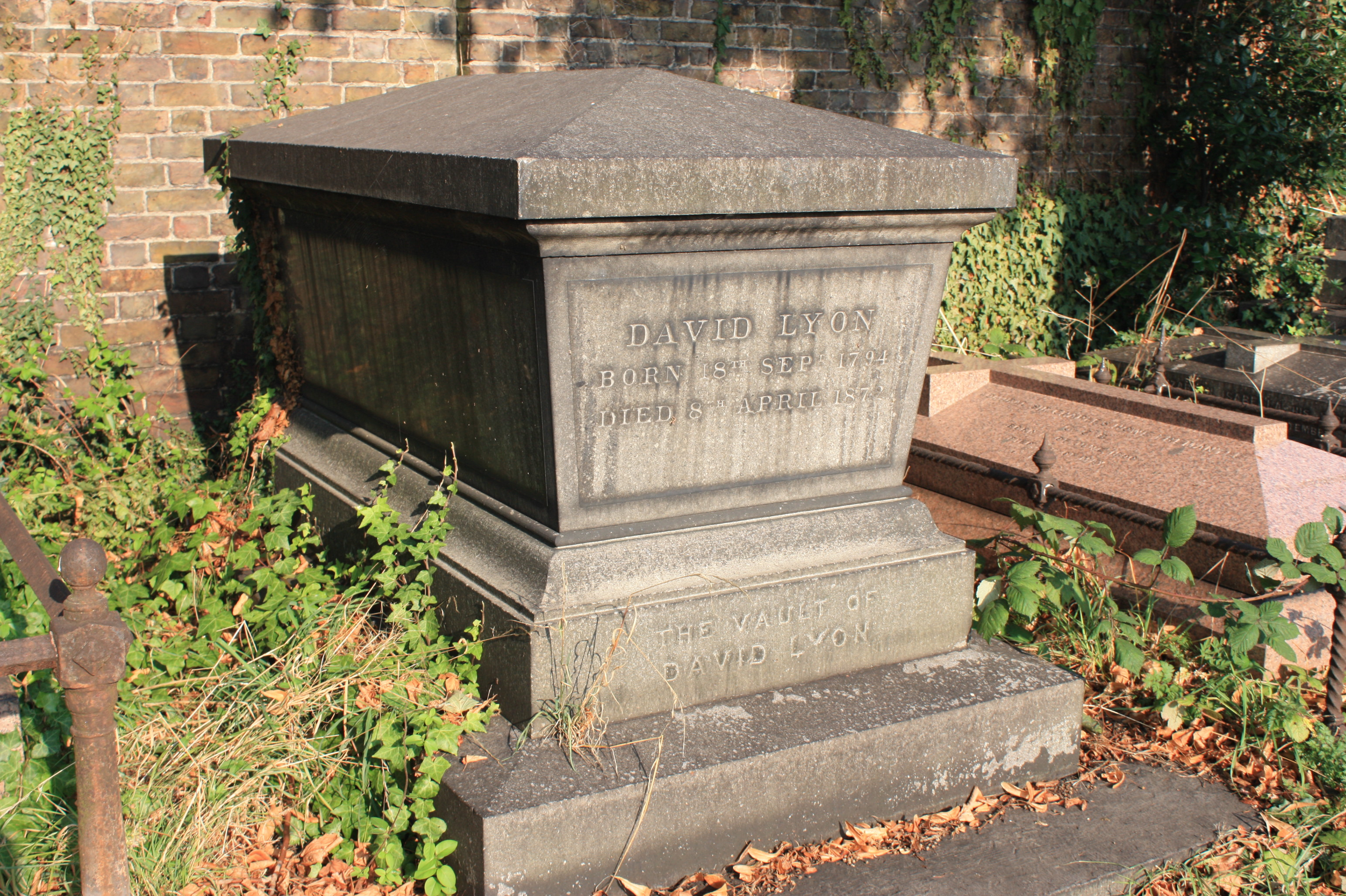
The grave of David Lyon, Brompton Cemetery, London

Lyon died on 8 April 1872, aged 77, at his winter residence in Nice, without his family, as a delay in telegrams meant his family did not know that he was ill. He is buried against the north wall of Brompton Cemetery in London towards the north end. His grave sits next to that of British naval officer Admiral Sir Charles Fremantle, namesake of Fremantle, Australia.

Lyon left Goring and Balintore to his only surviving brother William, and other property in Sussex to his nephew Arthur James Fremantle. At his death, Blanche Lyon – quoted as "long estranged from her husband" – was sued by her butcher-cum-moneylender, in which case it is stated that though she had £1,300 a year, she still lived far beyond her means.

The portrait stayed in the Lyon family until the death of Joy Lyon, who willed it to her friend Elizabeth Carnegy-Arbuthnott. In 1980 the portrait was sold at Christies and was bought by Baron Hans Heinrich Thyssen-Bornemisza a year later.
