= Ferring =

Village and parish in West Sussex, England

Coordinates: 50.81275°N 0.44812°W

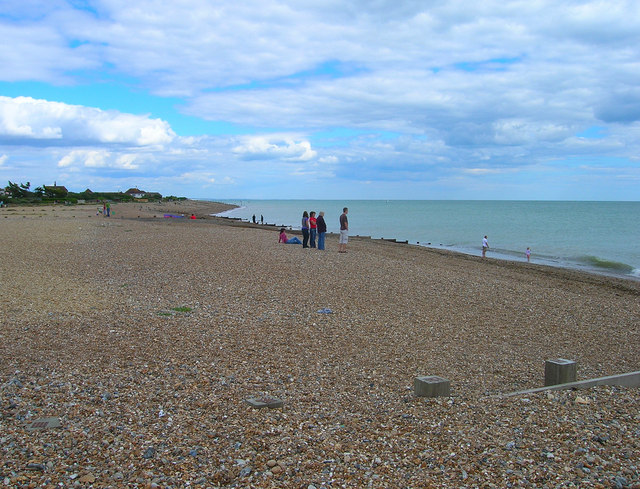
- Ferring Beach

- Location within West Sussex
- Area: 3.81 km^{2} (1.47 sq mi)
- Population: 4,480 (Civil/Ward Parish.2011)
  - Density: 1,176/km^{2} (3,050/sq mi)
- OS grid reference: TQ094026
  - London: 50 miles (80 km) NNE
- Civil parish: Ferring
- District: Arun
- Shire county: West Sussex
- Region: South East
- Country: England
- Sovereign state: United Kingdom
- Post town: WORTHING
- Postcode district: BN12
- Dialling code: 01903
- Police: Sussex
- Fire: West Sussex
- Ambulance: South East Coast
- UK Parliament: Worthing West

Ferring is a coastal village, civil parish and electoral ward in the Arun District of West Sussex, England. It is part of the built-up area of Worthing and is accessed along the A259 road 3 miles (4.8 km) west of the town - comprising North Down Farm and Highdown Hill to the north and the town itself to the south, with approximately equal size green buffers to the town in size, to east to Goring-by-Sea and west to East Preston.

In the 2001 census 4361 people lived in 2179 households, of whom 1423 were economically active. The area's seafront is pedestrianised and the beach itself is a mixture of shingle and pebble, reinforced by groynes. The population at the 2011 Census was 4,480. Famous for battle of Ferring that took place on 5 September 1782 in the area that is now known as Elm Park

== History ==
The site of the village is an ancient one: the name itself is Saxon; it is mentioned in the Domesday Book; the parish church is Norman, and is dedicated to St Andrew.

Until the 1920s the village was a small one; when the south coast began to be built-up, particularly with holiday homes, Ferring began to increase in size.

== Sport and leisure ==
Ferring has an amateur football club, Ferring Football Club, which plays at the Glebelands.

It also has an amateur cricket club, Ferring Cricket Club, which plays at the Little Twitten and is believed to have been established in 1864 or earlier. In 2024 the club entered into league cricket for the first time in its 160 year history. The club also plays friendly games on Sundays. The club has a youth section with three teams of different age groups.

Ferring Radio was a community licensed station broadcasting across the South Coast on 97.7fm originally for the benefit and experience of clients with special needs attending Ferring Country Centre. The station has been revived in 2020 on-line to provide music and local news and information during the extreme medical crisis and isolation.

Parks and open spaces

There are three parks in Ferring: Glebelands Recreation ground, Ferring Village Green and Little Twitten. Events take place in these areas at various times throughout the year.

== St Andrew's Church ==
St Andrew's church was built in 1170, although the site has had a church there since 765. It has a well-maintained courtyard and is situated in the centre of the village. In the churchyard are buried the ashes of Major John Bigelow Dodge (1894-1960), veteran of the Great Escape of 1944, and there is a Commonwealth war grave of a Royal Sussex Regiment officer of World War II.

== Ferring Rife ==
The Ferring Rife is a stream in West Sussex, England that rises in the West Durrington area of Worthing. It has multiple sources including one near Castle Goring and another in Titnore Wood. The streams that make up the Ferring Rife converge north of Littlehampton Road, passing through Maybridge, then west of Ferring into the sea. It flows southwest, west and then south into the English Channel, between the villages of Ferring and East Preston.
