= 1983 United Kingdom local elections =

- 5 May 1983

All 36 metropolitan boroughs, all 296 English districts and all 37 Welsh districts
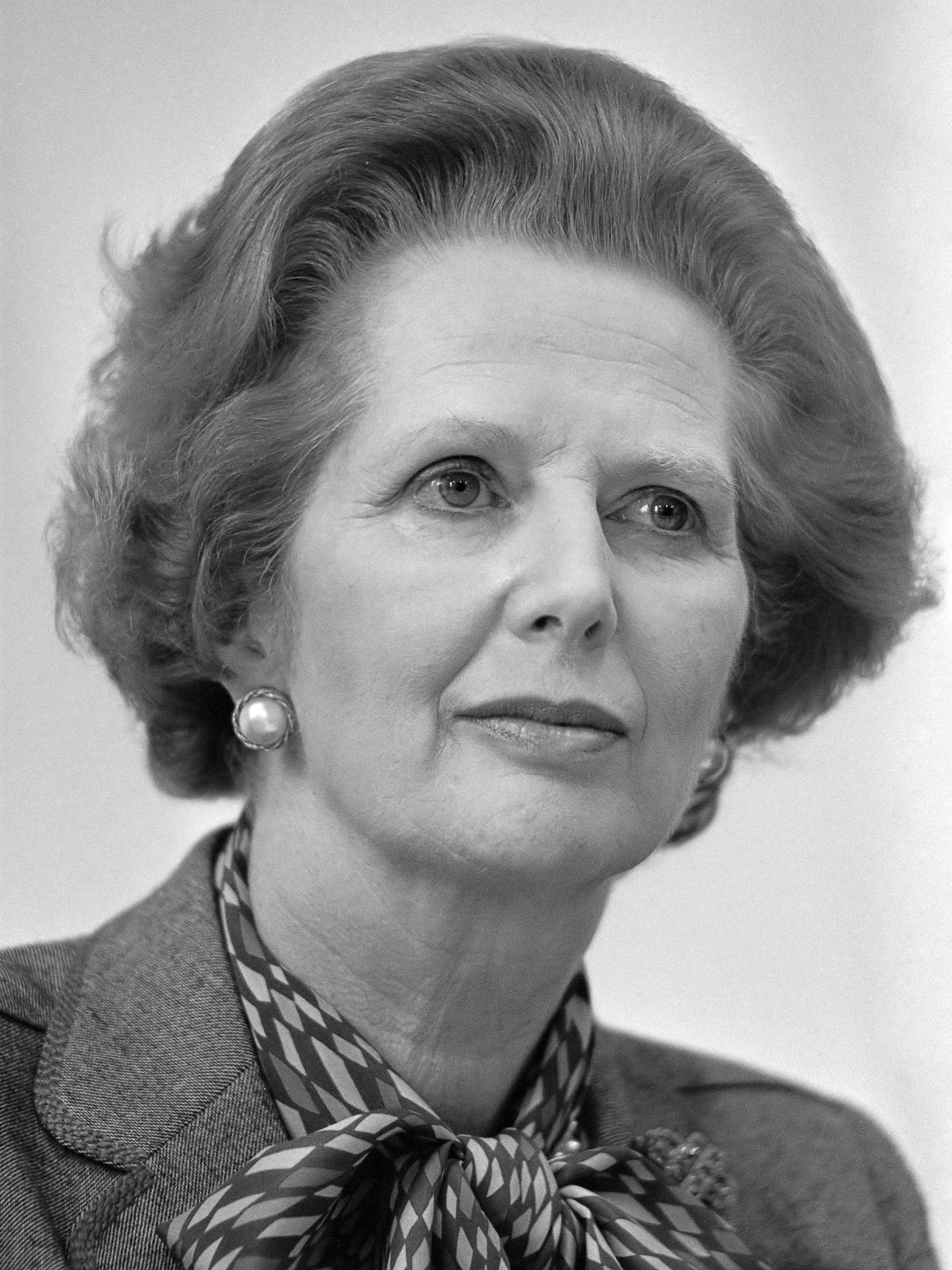

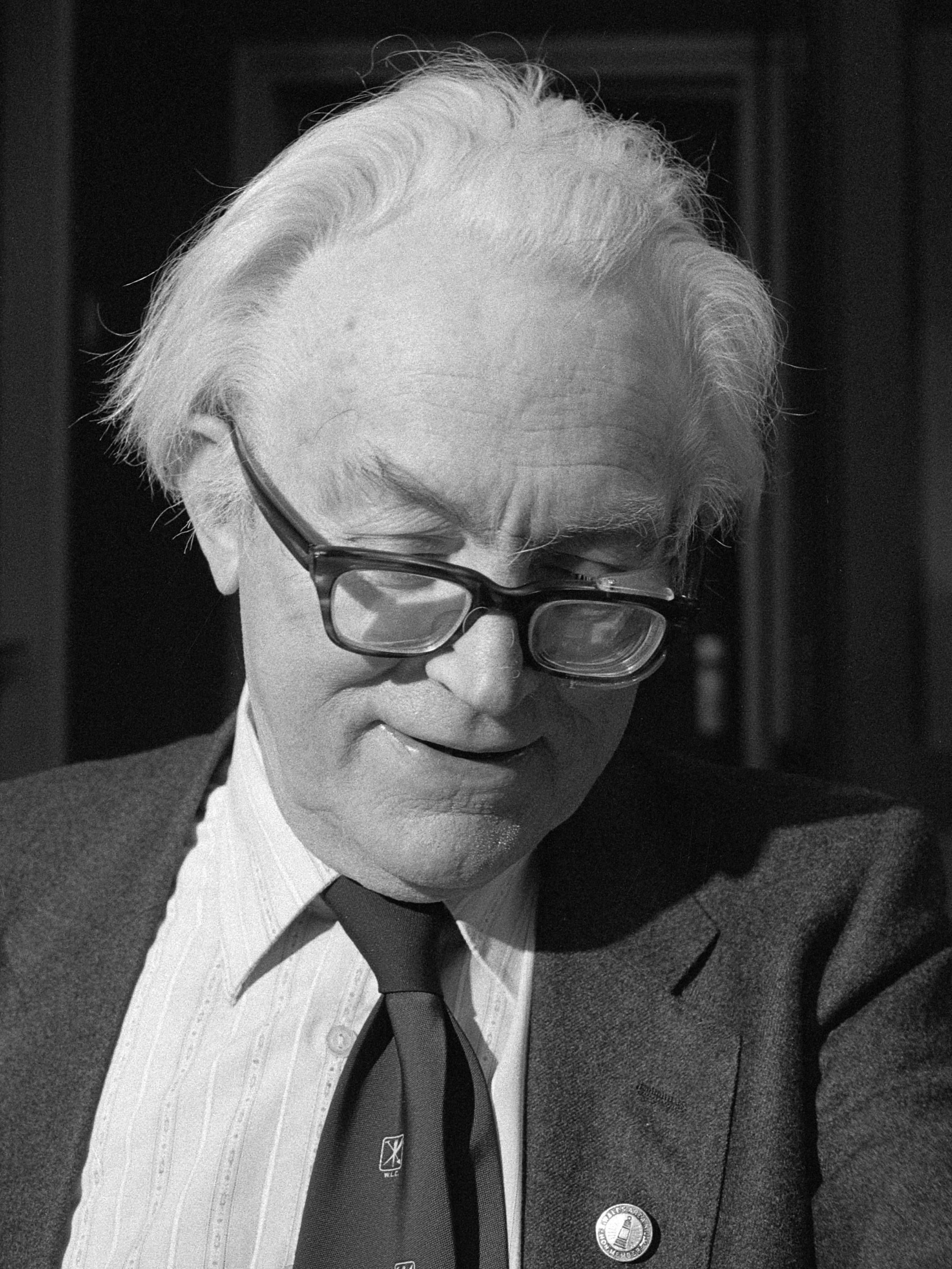

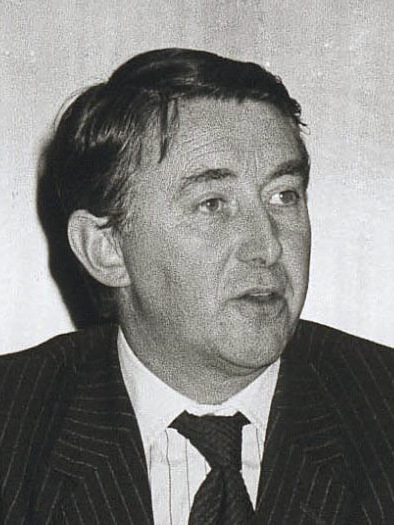

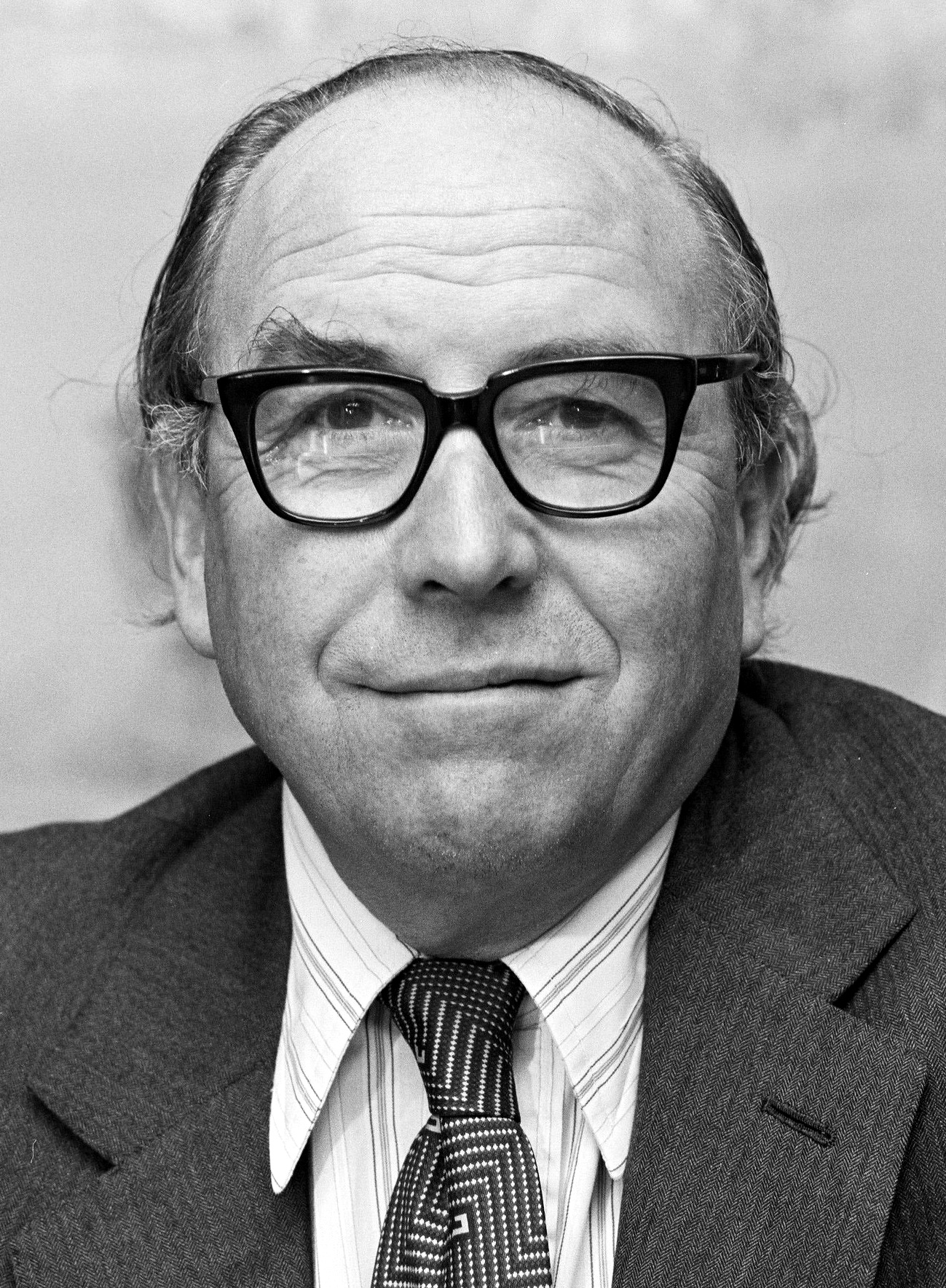
	Majority party	Minority party	Third party
Leader	Margaret Thatcher	Michael Foot	David Steel (Lib.); Roy Jenkins (SDP)
Party	Conservative	Labour	Alliance
Leader since	11 February 1975	10 November 1980	7 July 1976 / 7 July 1982
Percentage	39%	36%	20%
Councillors	10,557	8,782	2,171
Councillors +/-	▲110	▲8	▲321

Local elections were held in the United Kingdom on 5 May 1983. The results were a success for Conservative Prime Minister Margaret Thatcher, who soon afterwards called a general election in which the Conservatives won a landslide victory. The projected share of the vote was Conservative 39%, Labour Party 36%, Liberal-SDP Alliance 20%.

The three major parties all made net gains at the expense of smaller parties and independents, despite a slight reduction in the number of councillors. The Conservatives gained 110 seats, giving them 10,557 councillors. Labour gained just 8 seats, finishing with 8,782 seats. The Liberal-SDP Alliance gained 321 seats, finishing with 2,171 seats. It was a decent showing for Labour, with a much larger share of the vote than any opinion poll had shown since the party's split in 1981, but a major disappointment for the Alliance. However, the subsequent general election saw the Conservative government elected by a landslide, while the Alliance came close to Labour in terms of votes, although Labour won almost 10 times as many seats.

== England ==
=== Metropolitan boroughs ===
All 36 metropolitan borough councils had one third of their seats up for election.

Council	Previous control	Result	Details
Barnsley	Labour	Labour hold	Details
Birmingham	Conservative	Conservative hold	Details
Bolton	Labour	Labour hold	Details
Bradford	No overall control	No overall control hold	Details
Bury	Conservative	Conservative hold	Details
Calderdale	No overall control	No overall control hold	Details
Coventry	Labour	Labour hold	Details
Doncaster	Labour	Labour hold	Details
Dudley	Conservative	Conservative hold	Details
Gateshead	Labour	Labour hold	Details
Kirklees	Labour	Labour hold	Details
Knowsley	Labour	Labour hold	Details
Leeds	Labour	Labour hold	Details
Liverpool	No overall control	Labour gain	Details
Manchester	Labour	Labour hold	Details
Newcastle upon Tyne	Labour	Labour hold	Details
North Tyneside	Labour	Labour hold	Details
Oldham	Labour	Labour hold	Details
Rochdale	No overall control	No overall control hold	Details
Rotherham	Labour	Labour hold	Details
Salford	Labour	Labour hold	Details
Sandwell	Labour	Labour hold	Details
Sefton	Conservative	Conservative hold	Details
Sheffield	Labour	Labour hold	Details
Solihull	Conservative	Conservative hold	Details
South Tyneside	Labour	Labour hold	Details
St Helens	Labour	Labour hold	Details
Stockport	Conservative	No overall control gain	Details
Sunderland	Labour	Labour hold	Details
Tameside	Labour	Labour hold	Details
Trafford	Conservative	Conservative hold	Details
Wakefield	Labour	Labour hold	Details
Walsall	No overall control	No overall control hold	Details
Wigan	Labour	Labour hold	Details
Wirral	Conservative	Conservative hold	Details
Wolverhampton	Labour	Labour hold	Details

=== District councils ===
==== Whole council ====
In 193 districts the whole council was up for election.

In 54 districts there were new ward boundaries, following electoral boundary reviews by the Local Government Boundary Commission for England.

Council	Previous control	Result	Details
Allerdale	No overall control	No overall control hold	Details
Alnwick	No overall control	No overall control hold	Details
Arun ‡	Conservative	Conservative hold	Details
Ashfield	Labour	Labour hold	Details
Ashford	No overall control	Conservative gain	Details
Aylesbury Vale	Conservative	Conservative hold	Details
Babergh	No overall control	No overall control hold	Details
Berwick-upon-Tweed	Independent	No overall control gain	Details
Beverley	Conservative	Conservative hold	Details
Blaby ‡	Conservative	Conservative hold	Details
Blackpool	Conservative	Conservative hold	Details
Blyth Valley	Labour	Labour hold	Details
Bolsover	Labour	Labour hold	Details
Boothferry	Conservative	Conservative hold	Details
Boston	No overall control	No overall control hold	Details
Bournemouth	Conservative	Conservative hold	Details
Bracknell	Conservative	Conservative hold	Details
Braintree	No overall control	No overall control hold	Details
Breckland	Conservative	Conservative hold	Details
Bridgnorth	Independent	Independent hold	Details
Brighton ‡	Conservative	No overall control gain	Details
Bristol ‡	Labour	No overall control gain	Details
Bromsgrove	Conservative	Conservative hold	Details
Broxtowe	Conservative	Conservative hold	Details
Canterbury	Conservative	Conservative hold	Details
Caradon ‡	Independent	Independent hold	Details
Carlisle ‡	Labour	Labour hold	Details
Carrick	Conservative	No overall control gain	Details
Castle Morpeth	No overall control	No overall control hold	Details
Castle Point	Conservative	Conservative hold	Details
Charnwood ‡	Conservative	Conservative hold	Details
Chelmsford	Conservative	Alliance gain	Details
Cheltenham ‡	No overall control	No overall control hold	Details
Chesterfield	Labour	Labour hold	Details
Chester-le-Street	Labour	Labour hold	Details
Chichester	Conservative	Conservative hold	Details
Chiltern	Conservative	Conservative hold	Details
Christchurch	Conservative	Conservative hold	Details
Cleethorpes	No overall control	No overall control hold	Details
Copeland	Labour	Labour hold	Details
Corby	Labour	Labour hold	Details
Cotswold	Independent	Independent hold	Details
Dacorum	Conservative	Conservative hold	Details
Darlington	Labour	Labour hold	Details
Dartford	Labour	Conservative gain	Details
Derwentside	Labour	Labour hold	Details
Dover	Conservative	Conservative hold	Details
Durham	No overall control	Labour gain	Details
Easington	Labour	Labour hold	Details
East Cambridgeshire ‡	Independent	Independent hold	Details
East Hampshire	Conservative	Conservative hold	Details
East Hertfordshire	Conservative	Conservative hold	Details
East Lindsey ‡	Independent	Independent hold	Details
East Northamptonshire	Conservative	Conservative hold	Details
East Staffordshire	No overall control	No overall control hold	Details
East Yorkshire	Conservative	Conservative hold	Details
Eden	Independent	Independent hold	Details
Epsom and Ewell	Independent	Independent hold	Details
Erewash	Conservative	Conservative hold	Details
Exeter ‡	Conservative	Conservative hold	Details
Fenland	Conservative	Conservative hold	Details
Forest Heath	Conservative	No overall control gain	Details
Forest of Dean ‡	No overall control	No overall control hold	Details
Fylde	Conservative	Conservative hold	Details
Gedling	Conservative	Conservative hold	Details
Glanford	Conservative	Conservative hold	Details
Gravesham	Conservative	Conservative hold	Details
Guildford	Conservative	Conservative hold	Details
Hambleton	Independent	Independent hold	Details
Harborough ‡	Conservative	Conservative hold	Details
Harrogate ‡	Conservative	Conservative hold	Details
High Peak	No overall control	No overall control hold	Details
Hinckley and Bosworth ‡	Conservative	Conservative hold	Details
Holderness	Independent	Independent hold	Details
Horsham	Conservative	Conservative hold	Details
Hove	Conservative	Conservative hold	Details
Kennet	Independent	Independent hold	Details
Kerrier	No overall control	No overall control hold	Details
Kettering	No overall control	Conservative gain	Details
King's Lynn and West Norfolk ‡	Conservative	Conservative hold	Details
Kingston upon Hull ‡	Labour	Labour hold	Details
Kingswood	No overall control	Conservative gain	Details
Lancaster	Conservative	Conservative hold	Details
Langbaurgh	Labour	Labour hold	Details
Leicester ‡	Labour	Labour hold	Details
Lewes ‡	Conservative	Conservative hold	Details
Lichfield	Conservative	Conservative hold	Details
Luton	Conservative	Conservative hold	Details
Maldon	Conservative	No overall control gain	Details
Malvern Hills	Independent	Independent hold	Details
Mansfield	Labour	Labour hold	Details
Medina	Alliance	Alliance hold	Details
Melton	Conservative	Conservative hold	Details
Mendip	Independent	Conservative gain	Details
Mid Bedfordshire	Conservative	Conservative hold	Details
Mid Devon	Independent	Independent hold	Details
Mid Suffolk	No overall control	No overall control hold	Details
Mid Sussex ‡	Conservative	Conservative hold	Details
Middlesbrough	Labour	Labour hold	Details
New Forest	Conservative	Conservative hold	Details
Newark and Sherwood	No overall control	No overall control hold	Details
Newbury ‡	Conservative	Conservative hold	Details
North Bedfordshire ‡	Conservative	Conservative hold	Details
North Cornwall	Independent	Independent hold	Details
North Devon ‡	Independent	Independent hold	Details
North Dorset ‡	Independent	Independent hold	Details
North East Derbyshire	Labour	Labour hold	Details
North Kesteven	Independent	Independent hold	Details
North Norfolk	Independent	Independent hold	Details
North Shropshire	Independent	Independent hold	Details
North Warwickshire	Labour	Labour hold	Details
North West Leicestershire ‡	Labour	No overall control gain	Details
North Wiltshire ‡	Conservative	Conservative hold	Details
Northampton	Conservative	No overall control gain	Details
Northavon	Conservative	Conservative hold	Details
Nottingham	Labour	Labour hold	Details
Oswestry	Independent	Independent hold	Details
Plymouth	Conservative	Conservative hold	Details
Poole ‡	Conservative	Conservative hold	Details
Portsmouth ‡	Conservative	Conservative hold	Details
Reading ‡	No overall control	Conservative gain	Details
Redditch ‡	Conservative	Labour gain	Details
Restormel ‡	Independent	Independent hold	Details
Ribble Valley	Conservative	Conservative hold	Details
Richmondshire	Independent	Independent hold	Details
Rochester-upon-Medway	Conservative	Conservative hold	Details
Rother ‡	No overall control	Conservative gain	Details
Rushcliffe	Conservative	Conservative hold	Details
Rutland	Independent	Independent hold	Details
Ryedale ‡	Independent	Independent hold	Details
Salisbury	No overall control	No overall control hold	Details
Scarborough	Conservative	No overall control gain	Details
Sedgefield ‡	Labour	Labour hold	Details
Sedgemoor	Conservative	Conservative hold	Details
Selby	Conservative	Conservative hold	Details
Sevenoaks	Conservative	Conservative hold	Details
Shepway	Conservative	Conservative hold	Details
Slough ‡	Conservative	Labour gain	Details
South Bucks ‡	Conservative	Conservative hold	Details
South Derbyshire	No overall control	Labour gain	Details
South Hams	Independent	No overall control gain	Details
South Holland	Independent	Independent hold	Details
South Kesteven	Conservative	Conservative hold	Details
South Norfolk	Conservative	Conservative hold	Details
South Northamptonshire	Conservative	Conservative hold	Details
South Oxfordshire ‡	Conservative	Conservative hold	Details
South Ribble	Conservative	Conservative hold	Details
South Shropshire	Independent	Independent hold	Details
South Staffordshire	Conservative	Conservative hold	Details
South Wight	Independent	Conservative gain	Details
Spelthorne	Conservative	Conservative hold	Details
St Edmundsbury	Conservative	Conservative hold	Details
Stafford	No overall control	No overall control hold	Details
Staffordshire Moorlands	No overall control	No overall control hold	Details
Stockton-on-Tees	Labour	Labour hold	Details
Stroud ‡	Conservative	Conservative hold	Details
Suffolk Coastal ‡	Conservative	Conservative hold	Details
Surrey Heath	Conservative	Conservative hold	Details
Taunton Deane	Conservative	Conservative hold	Details
Teesdale ‡	Independent	Independent hold	Details
Teignbridge	Independent	No overall control gain	Details
Tendring	Conservative	Conservative hold	Details
Test Valley	Conservative	Conservative hold	Details
Tewkesbury ‡	Independent	Independent hold	Details
Thanet	Conservative	Independent gain	Details
The Wrekin	Labour	Labour hold	Details
Torbay ‡	Conservative	Conservative hold	Details
Torridge	Independent	Independent hold	Details
Tynedale	No overall control	No overall control hold	Details
Uttlesford	Conservative	Conservative hold	Details
Vale of White Horse	Conservative	Conservative hold	Details
Vale Royal	No overall control	No overall control hold	Details
Wansbeck	Labour	Labour hold	Details
Wansdyke	Conservative	Conservative hold	Details
Warrington	No overall control	Labour gain	Details
Warwick ‡	Conservative	Conservative hold	Details
Waveney ‡	Conservative	Conservative hold	Details
Waverley ‡	Conservative	Conservative hold	Details
Wealden ‡	Conservative	Conservative hold	Details
Wear Valley ‡	Labour	Labour hold	Details
Wellingborough ‡	Conservative	Conservative hold	Details
West Derbyshire	Conservative	Conservative hold	Details
West Devon	Independent	Independent hold	Details
West Dorset ‡	Independent	Independent hold	Details
West Somerset	Independent	Independent hold	Details
West Wiltshire ‡	Conservative	Conservative hold	Details
Wimborne ‡	Conservative	Conservative hold	Details
Windsor and Maidenhead ‡	Conservative	Conservative hold	Details
Worthing ‡	Conservative	Conservative hold	Details
Wychavon	Independent	No overall control gain	Details
Wycombe ‡	Conservative	Conservative hold	Details
Wyre	Conservative	Conservative hold	Details
Yeovil	No overall control	No overall control hold	Details

‡ New ward boundaries

==== Third of council ====
In 103 districts one third of the council was up for election.

Council	Previous control	Result	Details
Adur	Alliance	No overall control gain	Details
Amber Valley	Labour	Labour hold	Details
Barrow-in-Furness	Labour	Labour hold	Details
Basildon	Labour	Labour hold	Details
Basingstoke and Deane	No overall control	No overall control hold	Details
Bassetlaw	Labour	Labour hold	Details
Bath	Conservative	Conservative hold	Details
Blackburn	No overall control	Labour gain	Details
Brentwood	Conservative	Conservative hold	Details
Broadland	Conservative	Conservative hold	Details
Broxbourne	Conservative	Conservative hold	Details
Burnley	Labour	Labour hold	Details
Cambridge	No overall control	No overall control hold	Details
Cannock Chase	No overall control	No overall control hold	Details
Cherwell	Conservative	Conservative hold	Details
Chester	Conservative	Conservative hold	Details
Chorley	Conservative	No overall control gain	Details
Colchester	Conservative	Conservative hold	Details
Congleton	No overall control	Conservative gain	Details
Craven	Conservative	Conservative hold	Details
Crawley	Labour	Labour hold	Details
Crewe and Nantwich	No overall control	No overall control hold	Details
Daventry	No overall control	Conservative gain	Details
Derby	Labour	Labour hold	Details
East Devon	Conservative	Conservative hold	Details
Eastbourne	Conservative	Conservative hold	Details
Eastleigh	Conservative	No overall control gain	Details
Ellesmere Port and Neston	Labour	Labour hold	Details
Elmbridge	Conservative	Conservative hold	Details
Epping Forest	Conservative	Conservative hold	Details
Fareham	Conservative	Conservative hold	Details
Gillingham	Conservative	Conservative hold	Details
Gloucester	Conservative	Conservative hold	Details
Gosport	Conservative	Conservative hold	Details
Great Grimsby	Labour	No overall control gain	Details
Great Yarmouth	No overall control	Conservative gain	Details
Halton	Labour	Labour hold	Details
Harlow	Labour	Labour hold	Details
Hart	Conservative	No overall control gain	Details
Hartlepool	Labour	Labour hold	Details
Hastings	No overall control	No overall control hold	Details
Havant	Conservative	Conservative hold	Details
Hereford	Alliance	Alliance hold	Details
Hertsmere	Conservative	Conservative hold	Details
Huntingdon	Conservative	Conservative hold	Details
Hyndburn	Labour	Labour hold	Details
Ipswich	Labour	Labour hold	Details
Leominster	Independent	Independent hold	Details
Lincoln	Labour	Labour hold	Details
Macclesfield	Conservative	Conservative hold	Details
Maidstone	Conservative	No overall control gain	Details
Milton Keynes	No overall control	No overall control hold	Details
Mole Valley	No overall control	No overall control hold	Details
Newcastle-under-Lyme	Labour	Labour hold	Details
North Hertfordshire	Conservative	Conservative hold	Details
Norwich	Labour	Labour hold	Details
Nuneaton and Bedworth	Labour	Labour hold	Details
Oadby and Wigston	Conservative	Conservative hold	Details
Oxford	Labour	Labour hold	Details
Pendle	No overall control	No overall control hold	Details
Penwith	Independent	Independent hold	Details
Peterborough	No overall control	No overall control hold	Details
Preston	Labour	Labour hold	Details
Purbeck	Independent	Independent hold	Details
Reigate and Banstead	Conservative	Conservative hold	Details
Rochford	Conservative	Conservative hold	Details
Rossendale	Conservative	Conservative hold	Details
Rugby	No overall control	No overall control hold	Details
Runnymede	Conservative	Conservative hold	Details
Rushmoor	Conservative	Conservative hold	Details
Scunthorpe	Labour	Labour hold	Details
Shrewsbury and Atcham	No overall control	No overall control hold	Details
South Bedfordshire	Conservative	Conservative hold	Details
South Cambridgeshire	Independent	Independent hold	Details
South Herefordshire	Independent	Independent hold	Details
South Lakeland	No overall control	No overall control hold	Details
Southampton	Conservative	Conservative hold	Details
Southend-on-Sea	Conservative	Conservative hold	Details
St Albans	Conservative	Conservative hold	Details
Stevenage	Labour	Labour hold	Details
Stoke-on-Trent	Labour	Labour hold	Details
Stratford-on-Avon	Conservative	Conservative hold	Details
Swale	Conservative	Conservative hold	Details
Tamworth	Labour	Conservative gain	Details
Tandridge	Conservative	Conservative hold	Details
Thamesdown	Labour	Labour hold	Details
Three Rivers	Conservative	Conservative hold	Details
Thurrock	Labour	Labour hold	Details
Tonbridge and Malling	Conservative	Conservative hold	Details
Tunbridge Wells	Conservative	Conservative hold	Details
Watford	Labour	Labour hold	Details
Welwyn Hatfield	Labour	Labour hold	Details
West Lancashire	Conservative	Conservative hold	Details
West Lindsey	No overall control	No overall control hold	Details
West Oxfordshire	No overall control	Conservative gain	Details
Weymouth and Portland	No overall control	No overall control hold	Details
Winchester	Conservative	Conservative hold	Details
Woking	Conservative	Conservative hold	Details
Wokingham	Conservative	Conservative hold	Details
Woodspring	Conservative	Conservative hold	Details
Worcester	Labour	No overall control gain	Details
Wyre Forest	No overall control	No overall control hold	Details
York	No overall control	No overall control hold	Details

== Wales ==
=== District councils ===
Council	Previous control	Result	Details
Aberconwy	Independent	No overall control gain	Details
Afan	Labour	Labour hold	Details
Alyn and Deeside	No overall control	No overall control hold	Details
Anglesey - Ynys Môn	Independent	Independent hold	Details
Arfon	No overall control	No overall control hold	Details
Blaenau Gwent	Labour	Labour hold	Details
Brecknock	Independent	Independent hold	Details
Cardiff	Labour	Conservative gain	Details
Carmarthen	Independent	Independent hold	Details
Ceredigion	Independent	Independent hold	Details
Colwyn	No overall control	No overall control hold	Details
Cynon Valley	Labour	Labour hold	Details
Delyn	No overall control	No overall control hold	Details
Dinefwr	Independent	Labour gain	Details
Dwyfor	Independent	Independent hold	Details
Glyndŵr	Independent	Independent hold	Details
Islwyn	Labour	Labour hold	Details
Llanelli	Labour	Labour hold	Details
Lliw Valley	Labour	Labour hold	Details
Meirionnydd	Independent	Independent hold	Details
Merthyr Tydfil	Labour	Labour hold	Details
Monmouth	Conservative	Conservative hold	Details
Montgomery	Independent	Independent hold	Details
Neath	Labour	Labour hold	Details
Newport	Labour	Labour hold	Details
Ogwr	No overall control	No overall control hold	Details
Preseli	Independent	Independent hold	Details
Radnor	Independent	Independent hold	Details
Rhondda	Labour	Labour hold	Details
Rhuddlan	Independent	Independent hold	Details
Rhymney Valley	Labour	Labour hold	Details
South Pembrokeshire	Independent	Independent hold	Details
Swansea	Labour	Labour hold	Details
Taff-Ely	Labour	Labour hold	Details
Torfaen	Labour	Labour hold	Details
Vale of Glamorgan	Conservative	Conservative hold	Details
Wrexham Maelor	No overall control	No overall control hold	Details
