= 1983 King's Lynn and West Norfolk Borough Council election =

1983 English local election

1983 King's Lynn & West Norfolk Borough Council election
- 5 May 1983

All 60 seats to King's Lynn & West Norfolk Borough Council 31 seats needed for a majority
- Registered: 93,623
- Turnout: ~43.8% (▼4.7%)

	First party	Second party
Party	Conservative	Labour
Seats won	42	15
Seat change	Steady	Steady
Popular vote	34,077	24,131
Percentage	53.4%	37.8%
Swing	▲3.9%	▼6.0%
	Third party	Fourth party
Party	Independent	Alliance
Seats won	2	1
Seat change	▼1	▲1
Popular vote	2,417	3,153
Percentage	3.8%	4.9%
Swing	▼1.3%	▲3.8%
- Winner of each seat at the 1983 King's Lynn & West Norfolk Borough Council election.
Control before election
Conservative
Control after election
Conservative

The 1983 King's Lynn & West Norfolk Borough Council election took place on 5 May 1983 to elect members of King's Lynn & West Norfolk Borough Council in Norfolk, England. This was on the same day as other local elections.

== Summary ==
=== Election result ===
1983 King's Lynn and West Norfolk Borough Council election
Party	Candidates	Seats	Gains	Losses	Net gain/loss	Seats %	Votes %	Votes	+/−
Conservative	59	42	N/A	N/A	Steady	70.0	53.4	34,077	+3.9
Labour	48	15	N/A	N/A	Steady	25.0	37.8	24,131	–6.0
Independent	8	2	N/A	N/A	▼1	3.3	3.8	2,417	–1.3
Alliance	13	1	N/A	N/A	▲1	1.7	4.9	3,153	+3.8

== Ward results ==
Incumbent councillors standing for re-election are marked with an asterisk (*). Changes in seats do not take into account by-elections or defections.

=== Airfield ===
Airfield (2 seats)
Party	Candidate	Votes	%	±%
Conservative	J. Bagge*	709	69.6	N/A
Conservative	J. Bagge	684	67.2	N/A
Labour	G. Holding	308	30.3	N/A
Labour	W. Holding	282	27.7	N/A
Turnout		~1,017	38.0	N/A
Registered electors		2,675		
Conservative hold				
Conservative hold				

=== Burnham ===
Burnham
Party	Candidate	Votes	%	±%
Conservative	E. Coke*	547	60.4	N/A
Labour	J. Rosser	247	27.3	N/A
Alliance	C. Raison	111	12.3	N/A
Majority		300	37.8	N/A
Turnout		905	67.4	N/A
Registered electors		1,343		
Conservative hold				

=== Chase ===
Chase (2 seats)
Party	Candidate	Votes	%
Conservative	B. Barton	650	44.7
Conservative	F. Cork	559	38.4
Labour	L. Watts	470	32.3
Labour	N. Cooper	466	32.0
Alliance	K. Leeder	261	18.0
Independent	L. Goold	73	5.0
Turnout		~1,453	45.1
Registered electors		3,222	
Conservative win (new seat)			
Conservative win (new seat)			

=== Clenchwarton ===
Clenchwarton
Party	Candidate	Votes	%	±%
Conservative	N. Lane	520	54.4	+10.5
Labour	R. Sainty	436	45.6	+19.1
Majority		84	8.8	–5.5
Turnout		956	56.3	–24.4
Registered electors		1,698		
Conservative hold		Swing	▼4.3	

=== Creake ===
Creake
Party	Candidate	Votes	%	±%
Labour	R. Vallance	469	55.0	N/A
Conservative	M. Kelly	383	45.0	N/A
Majority		86	10.1	N/A
Turnout		852	61.0	N/A
Registered electors		1,396		
Labour gain from Conservative				

=== Denton ===
Denton (3 seats)
Party	Candidate	Votes	%	±%
Conservative	M. Jones*	942	59.1	+5.8
Conservative	C. Sharp	800	50.2	–1.0
Conservative	A. White	743	46.6	–3.9
Labour	J. Waterfall	655	41.1	–5.8
Turnout		~1,596	38.3	–36.2
Registered electors		4,166		
Conservative hold				
Conservative hold				
Conservative hold				

=== Denver ===
Denver
Party	Candidate	Votes	%	±%
Independent	J. Sharpe*	580	65.0	–5.8
Conservative	C. Cooper	312	35.0	+5.8
Majority		268	30.0	–11.6
Turnout		892	58.8	–22.5
Registered electors		1,516		
Independent hold		Swing	▼5.8	

=== Dersingham ===
Dersingham (2 seats)
Party	Candidate	Votes	%	±%
Conservative	I. Stockwell*	1,027	45.2	N/A
Conservative	W. Greenwood*	779	34.3	N/A
Independent	G. Pratt	715	31.5	N/A
Labour	W. Watson	531	23.4	N/A
Turnout		~2,272	65.6	N/A
Registered electors		3,464		
Conservative hold				
Conservative hold				

=== Docking ===
Docking
Party	Candidate	Votes	%	±%
Labour	M. Howard*	480	61.0	+0.7
Conservative	C. Smith	232	29.5	–10.2
Alliance	A. Bates	75	9.5	N/A
Majority		248	31.5	+10.9
Turnout		787	56.1	–22.5
Registered electors		1,402		
Labour hold		Swing	▲5.5	

=== Downham Market ===
Downham Market (3 seats)
Party	Candidate	Votes	%	±%
Conservative	L. Brown*	1,288	48.9	–5.0
Conservative	H. Rose*	1,231	46.7	+1.2
Conservative	H. Blakey*	905	34.3	N/A
Independent	T. Taylor	846	32.1	N/A
Labour	M. Stewart	498	18.9	–9.2
Labour	T. Mansfield	467	17.7	N/A
Turnout		~2,630	53.9	–39.3
Registered electors		4,880		
Conservative hold				
Conservative hold				
Conservative win (new seat)				

=== Emneth ===
Emneth
Party	Candidate	Votes	%	±%
Independent	N. Terrington*	Unopposed		
Registered electors		1,513		
Independent gain from Conservative				

=== Gayton ===
Gayton
Party	Candidate	Votes	%	±%
Conservative	I. Major*	500	60.1	–5.9
Labour	M. James	207	24.9	–9.1
Alliance	G. Overton	125	15.0	N/A
Majority		293	35.2	+3.2
Turnout		832	55.5	–26.3
Registered electors		1,498		
Conservative hold		Swing	▲1.6	

=== Gaywood Central ===
Gaywood Central (2 seats)
Party	Candidate	Votes	%
Conservative	R. Bostock	675	48.6
Conservative	F. Barton*	657	47.3
Alliance	J. Loveless	394	28.4
Labour	W. Davison	319	23.0
Labour	P. Richards	299	21.6
Alliance	J. Morrod	295	21.3
Turnout		~1,389	48.8
Registered electors		2,847	
Conservative win (new seat)			
Conservative win (new seat)			

=== Gaywood North ===
Gaywood North (3 seats)
Party	Candidate	Votes	%
Conservative	D. Garwood*	894	59.2
Conservative	T. Swann*	858	56.8
Conservative	L. Daubney	842	55.7
Labour	H. Billings	614	40.6
Labour	G. Marrin	600	39.6
Labour	B. Burch	578	38.3
Turnout		~1,509	39.0
Registered electors		3,871	
Conservative win (new seat)			
Conservative win (new seat)			
Conservative win (new seat)			

=== Gaywood South ===
Gaywood South (3 seats)
Party	Candidate	Votes	%
Labour	A. Burch*	1,340	71.5
Labour	M. Wilkinson	1,335	71.3
Labour	P. Wilkinson*	1,333	71.2
Conservative	A. Bridge	529	28.2
Conservative	E. Nockolds	513	27.4
Conservative	B. Rawlinson	492	26.2
Turnout		~1,871	37.7
Registered electors		4,962	
Labour win (new seat)			
Labour win (new seat)			
Labour win (new seat)			

=== Grimston ===
Grimston
Party	Candidate	Votes	%	±%
Conservative	J. Reader*	536	51.7	N/A
Alliance	S. Goldsmith	268	25.9	N/A
Labour	V. Cross	232	22.4	N/A
Majority		268	25.8	N/A
Turnout		1,036	51.7	N/A
Registered electors		2,002		
Conservative hold				

=== Heacham ===
Heacham (2 seats)
Party	Candidate	Votes	%	±%
Conservative	V. Stapley*	969	54.1	–3.4
Conservative	E. Gidney*	947	52.9	+5.4
Labour	J. Weston	493	27.5	–14.8
Labour	J. Maiden	431	24.0	N/A
Alliance	J. Wright	328	18.3	N/A
Turnout		~1,789	49.4	–29.0
Registered electors		3,622		
Conservative hold				
Conservative hold				

=== Hunstanton ===
Hunstanton (2 seats)
Party	Candidate	Votes	%	±%
Conservative	T. Legge*	1,045	65.8	N/A
Conservative	C. Matkin	1,014	63.8	N/A
Labour	B. Devlin	543	34.2	N/A
Labour	C. Dearden	423	26.6	N/A
Turnout		~1,589	44.6	N/A
Registered electors		3,562		
Conservative hold				
Conservative hold				

=== Lynn Central ===
Lynn Central (2 seats)
Party	Candidate	Votes	%
Conservative	J. Cook	404	50.2
Labour	W. Batstone	400	49.7
Conservative	R. Fraulo	368	45.8
Labour	A. West	326	40.5
Turnout		~803	38.7
Registered electors		2,075	
Conservative win (new seat)			
Labour win (new seat)			

=== Lynn North ===
Lynn North (2 seats)
Party	Candidate	Votes	%
Labour	F. Juniper	964	78.1
Labour	G. Defty	902	73.0
Conservative	S. Dorrington	269	21.8
Conservative	G. Brown	151	12.2
Turnout		~1,233	39.3
Registered electors		3,139	
Labour win (new seat)			
Labour win (new seat)			

=== Lynn South West ===
Lynn South West (2 seats)
Party	Candidate	Votes	%	±%
Labour	D. Benefer*	723	56.2	+12.1
Labour	W. Baker*	701	54.5	+12.1
Conservative	C. Garrod	320	24.9	+1.4
Conservative	J. Hobday-Pepper	286	22.3	+0.1
Alliance	R. Everett	244	19.0	N/A
Turnout		~1,286	32.8	–46.2
Registered electors		3,922		
Labour hold				
Labour hold				

=== Mershe Lande ===
Mershe Lande
Party	Candidate	Votes	%	±%
Conservative	H. Goose*	Unopposed		
Registered electors		1,600		
Conservative hold				

=== Middleton ===
Middleton
Party	Candidate	Votes	%	±%
Conservative	J. Lemon*	516	68.6	N/A
Labour	J. Watson	236	31.4	N/A
Majority		280	37.2	N/A
Turnout		752	50.5	N/A
Registered electors		1,489		
Conservative hold				

=== North Coast ===
North Coast
Party	Candidate	Votes	%	±%
Conservative	R. Gibbs	680	76.1	N/A
Labour	C. Jennings	214	23.9	N/A
Majority		466	52.2	N/A
Turnout		894	47.7	N/A
Registered electors		1,875		
Conservative hold				

=== Priory ===
Priory
Party	Candidate	Votes	%	±%
Labour	T. Ward	447	63.6	+11.3
Conservative	R. Peck	175	24.9	–22.9
Independent	R. Hayward	82	11.7	N/A
Majority		272	38.7	+34.3
Turnout		704	60.3	–20.5
Registered electors		1,168		
Labour hold		Swing	▲17.1	

=== Rudham ===
Rudham
Party	Candidate	Votes	%	±%
Labour	B. Seaman*	383	62.6	+3.2
Conservative	R. Dowen	229	37.4	–3.2
Majority		154	25.2	+6.4
Turnout		612	57.6	–23.0
Registered electors		1,063		
Labour hold		Swing	▲3.2	

=== Snettisham ===
Snettisham
Party	Candidate	Votes	%	±%
Conservative	F. Barwick*	470	57.4	N/A
Labour	A. Dale	349	42.6	N/A
Majority		121	14.8	N/A
Turnout		819	43.5	N/A
Registered electors		1,883		
Conservative hold				

=== Spellowfields ===
Spellowfields (2 seats)
Party	Candidate	Votes	%	±%
Conservative	B. Howling*	702	57.0	+9.1
Conservative	J. Wright*	671	54.5	+11.4
Labour	F. Howlett	529	42.9	+13.1
Labour	W. Cowen	431	35.0	N/A
Turnout		~1,230	39.1	–54.1
Registered electors		3,145		
Conservative hold				
Conservative hold				

=== St. Lawrence ===
St. Lawrence
Party	Candidate	Votes	%	±%
Conservative	W. Garner*	379	50.5	–10.9
Labour	A. Green	287	38.2	–0.5
Alliance	J. Heley	86	11.5	N/A
Majority		92	12.3	–10.4
Turnout		752	47.1	–31.2
Registered electors		1,598		
Conservative hold		Swing	▼5.2	

=== St. Margarets ===
St. Margarets
Party	Candidate	Votes	%	±%
Labour	C. Heron	352	40.0	–4.1
Alliance	B. Goldstone	267	30.3	+14.9
Conservative	H. Bolt	260	29.6	–10.8
Majority		85	9.7	+6.0
Turnout		879	54.7	–24.3
Registered electors		1,607		
Labour hold		Swing	▼9.5	

=== Ten Mile ===
Ten Mile
Party	Candidate	Votes	%	±%
Labour	J. Simper*	380	50.5	+0.5
Conservative	T. Ferguson	373	49.5	–0.5
Majority		7	0.9	+0.9
Turnout		753	42.4	–32.3
Registered electors		1,777		
Labour hold		Swing	▲0.5	

=== The Walpoles ===
The Walpoles
Party	Candidate	Votes	%	±%
Conservative	E. Kemp*	Unopposed		
Registered electors		1,763		
Conservative gain from Independent				

=== The Woottons ===
The Woottons (2 seats)
Party	Candidate	Votes	%
Conservative	R. Spencer*	1,310	70.0
Conservative	L. Dutton*	1,295	69.2
Labour	S. Fish	561	30.0
Labour	J. Higgins	522	27.9
Turnout		~1,872	51.0
Registered electors		3,670	
Conservative win (new seat)			
Conservative win (new seat)			

=== Upwell, Outwell & Delph ===
Upwell, Outwell & Delph (2 seats)
Party	Candidate	Votes	%
Conservative	M. Clark	Unopposed	
Conservative	E. Feary*	Unopposed	
Registered electors		3,228	
Conservative win (new seat)			
Conservative win (new seat)			

=== Valley Hill ===
Valley Hill
Party	Candidate	Votes	%
Labour	M. Tilbury*	677	59.1
Conservative	J. Saint	468	40.9
Majority		209	18.2
Turnout		1,145	64.5
Registered electors		1,774	
Labour win (new seat)			

=== Watlington ===
Watlington
Party	Candidate	Votes	%	±%
Conservative	P. Haynes*	659	71.8	N/A
Labour	R. Williams	259	28.2	N/A
Majority		400	43.6	N/A
Turnout		918	57.6	N/A
Registered electors		1,595		
Conservative hold				

=== West Walton ===
West Walton
Party	Candidate	Votes	%	±%
Independent	F. Jude*	Unopposed		
Registered electors		1,029		
Independent hold				

=== West Winch ===
West Winch
Party	Candidate	Votes	%	±%
Conservative	G. Davies	557	57.6	N/A
Alliance	A. Walker	235	24.3	N/A
Labour	J. Boswell	175	18.1	N/A
Majority		322	33.3	N/A
Turnout		967	49.5	N/A
Registered electors		1,955		
Conservative hold				

=== Wiggenhall ===
Wiggenhall
Party	Candidate	Votes	%	±%
Conservative	J. Turrell*	296	43.9	N/A
Labour	G. Wilkinson	257	38.1	N/A
Independent	G. Caley	121	18.0	N/A
Majority		39	5.8	N/A
Turnout		674	47.6	N/A
Registered electors		1,417		
Conservative hold				

=== Wissey ===
Wissey
Party	Candidate	Votes	%
Alliance	J. Marsh	464	50.4
Conservative	J. Cowieson	457	49.6
Majority		7	0.8
Turnout		921	52.1
Registered electors		1,768	
Alliance win (new seat)			
