= 1983 Fylde Borough Council election =

Election

- 5 May 1983

All 49 seats to Fylde Borough Council 26 seats needed for a majority

| | First party | Second party | Third party |
|---|---|---|---|
| Party | Conservative | Residents | Independent |
| Last election | 28 | 9 | 7 |
| Seats won | 22 | 10 | 8 |
| Seat change | ▼6 | ▲1 | ▲1 |
| | Fourth party |
| Party | Liberal |
| Last election | 3 |
| Seats won | 7 |
| Seat change | ▲4 |
Leader before election
Conservative
Leader after election
Conservative

The 1983 Fylde Borough Council election took place on 5 May 1983. This was on the same day as other local elections in England.

== Election result ==
1983 Fylde Borough Council
| Party | Candidates | Seats | Gains | Losses | Net gain/loss | Seats % | Votes % | Votes | +/− |
|---|---|---|---|---|---|---|---|---|---|
| Conservative | 34 | 26 | 4 | 4 | 0 | | | | |
| Labour | 15 | 1 | 0 | 0 | 0 | | | | |
| Residents | 13 | 11 | 2 | 2 | 0 | | | | |
| Independent | 13 | 9 | 2 | 1 | ▲1 | | | | |
| Liberal | 11 | 2 | 0 | 2 | ▼2 | | | | |

== Ward Results ==
=== Ansdell ===
Ansdell (3 seats)
| Party | Candidate | Votes | % | ±% |
|---|---|---|---|---|
| Conservative | Tavernor J. | 914 | 36.3 | |
| Conservative | Simpson F. | 898 | | |
| Residents | Fletcher E. | 821 | 32.6 | |
| Liberal | Woodhouse P. | 786 | 31.2 | |
| Conservative | Booth D. | 724 | | |
| Turnout | | | 44.0 | |
| Conservative hold | | | | |
| Conservative gain from Liberal | | | | |
| Residents hold | | | | |

=== Ashton ===
Ashton (3 seats)
| Party | Candidate | Votes | % | ±% |
|---|---|---|---|---|
| Independent | Jones J. | 827 | 27.6 | |
| Residents | Boss S. | 819 | 27.3 | |
| Conservative | Rigby A. | 786 | 26.2 | |
| Conservative | Dobson H. | 714 | | |
| Liberal | Cash B. Ms. | 567 | 18.9 | |
| Turnout | | | 39.0 | |
| Independent gain from Conservative | | | | |
| Residents hold | | | | |
| Conservative hold | | | | |

=== Bryning With Warton ===
Bryning With Warton (2 seats)
| Party | Candidate | Votes | % | ±% |
|---|---|---|---|---|
| Independent | Rigby W. | Unopposed | | |
| Independent | Howorth D. | Unopposed | | |
| Turnout | | 0 | 0.0 | |
| Independent hold | | | | |
| Independent hold | | | | |

=== Central ===
Central (3 seats)
| Party | Candidate | Votes | % | ±% |
|---|---|---|---|---|
| Conservative | Duffy F. | 796 | 31.4 | |
| Residents | Procopides M. Ms. | 671 | 26.5 | |
| Conservative | Macdonald N. | 580 | | |
| Liberal | Macdonald C. Ms. | 576 | 22.7 | |
| Conservative | Colquhoun L. Ms. | 466 | | |
| Labour | Wilkinson J. | 304 | 12.0 | |
| Independent | Mylroie A. | 189 | 7.5 | |
| Turnout | | | 34.0 | |
| Conservative hold | | | | |
| Residents hold | | | | |
| Conservative hold | | | | |

=== Clifton ===
Clifton (3 seats)
| Party | Candidate | Votes | % | ±% |
|---|---|---|---|---|
| Conservative | Thompson W. | 903 | 39.7 | |
| Conservative | Hodgson C. Ms. | 879 | | |
| Conservative | Fuller N. | 741 | | |
| Residents | Buckley V. Ms. | 639 | 28.1 | |
| Liberal | Sherman G. | 471 | 20.7 | |
| Labour | Dixon L. | 259 | 11.4 | |
| Turnout | | | 42.0 | |
| Conservative hold | | | | |
| Conservative hold | | | | |
| Conservative hold | | | | |

=== Elswick & Little Eccleston ===
Elswick & Little Eccleston (1 seat)
| Party | Candidate | Votes | % | ±% |
|---|---|---|---|---|
| Independent | Hayhurst P. | Unopposed | | |
| Turnout | | 0 | 0.0 | |
| Independent hold | | | | |

=== Fairhaven ===
Fairhaven (3 seats)
| Party | Candidate | Votes | % | ±% |
|---|---|---|---|---|
| Residents | Wilding J. Ms. | 945 | 37.6 | |
| Conservative | Caldwell G. | 832 | 33.1 | |
| Conservative | Jealous A. | 707 | | |
| Liberal | Fairbrother E. | 563 | 22.4 | |
| Labour | Shellard S. | 175 | 7.0 | |
| Turnout | | | 33.0 | |
| Residents hold | | | | |
| Conservative hold | | | | |
| Conservative hold | | | | |

=== Freckleton East ===
Freckleton East (2 seats)
| Party | Candidate | Votes | % | ±% |
|---|---|---|---|---|
| Conservative | Payne J. | Unopposed | | |
| Conservative | Spencer R. | Unopposed | | |
| Turnout | | 0 | 0.0 | |
| Conservative gain from Ind. Conservative | | | | |
| Conservative hold | | | | |

=== Freckleton West ===
Freckleton West (2 seats)
| Party | Candidate | Votes | % | ±% |
|---|---|---|---|---|
| Independent | Rigby L. | 787 | 44.7 | |
| Conservative | Fiddler T. | 746 | 42.3 | |
| Labour | Wenman M. | 229 | 13.0 | |
| Labour | Wilkinson J. | 197 | | |
| Turnout | | | 41.0 | |
| Independent hold | | | | |
| Conservative hold | | | | |

=== Heyhouses ===
Heyhouses (3 seats)
| Party | Candidate | Votes | % | ±% |
|---|---|---|---|---|
| Residents | Prestwich D. Ms. | 1,157 | 37.3 | |
| Conservative | Mason J. Ms. | 979 | 31.6 | |
| Liberal | Smith A. Ms. | 964 | 31.1 | |
| Conservative | Woodburn C. | 779 | | |
| Liberal | Wilby C. | 667 | | |
| Turnout | | | 39.0 | |
| Residents hold | | | | |
| Conservative hold | | | | |
| Liberal hold | | | | |

=== Kilnhouse ===
Kilnhouse (3 seats)
| Party | Candidate | Votes | % | ±% |
|---|---|---|---|---|
| Residents | Lane J. | 1,556 | 50.1 | |
| Residents | Watson M. Ms. | 1,147 | | |
| Conservative | Parkinson J. | 753 | 24.3 | |
| Conservative | Pryce D. | 553 | | |
| Liberal | Card D. | 472 | 15.2 | |
| Labour | Scammells B. | 322 | 10.4 | |
| Turnout | | | 43.0 | |
| Residents hold | | | | |
| Residents gain from Conservative | | | | |
| Conservative hold | | | | |

=== Kirkham North ===
Kirkham North (2 seats)
| Party | Candidate | Votes | % | ±% |
|---|---|---|---|---|
| Residents | Fisher R. | 968 | 41.8 | |
| Conservative | Bennett J. | 886 | 38.2 | |
| Independent | Garratt P. | 285 | 12.3 | |
| Independent | Capper P. | 178 | | |
| Labour | Evans R. Ms. | 178 | 7.7 | |
| Turnout | | | 47.0 | |
| Residents hold | | | | |
| Conservative hold | | | | |

=== Kirkham South ===
Kirkham South (2 seats)
| Party | Candidate | Votes | % | ±% |
|---|---|---|---|---|
| Conservative | Hodgson B. | 716 | 50.6 | |
| Independent | Beckett K. | 480 | 33.9 | |
| Conservative | Paton R. | 377 | | |
| Labour | Lawrenson B. | 218 | 15.4 | |
| Labour | Leatham E. | 162 | | |
| Turnout | | | 46.0 | |
| Conservative hold | | | | |
| Independent gain from Conservative | | | | |

=== Medlar-With-Wesham ===
Medlar-With-Wesham (2 seats)
| Party | Candidate | Votes | % | ±% |
|---|---|---|---|---|
| Independent | Bamber G. | Unopposed | | |
| Independent | Bamber G. | Unopposed | | |
| Turnout | | 0 | 0.0 | |
| Independent hold | | | | |
| Independent hold | | | | |

=== Newton & Treales ===
Newton & Treales (2 seats)
| Party | Candidate | Votes | % | ±% |
|---|---|---|---|---|
| Conservative | Dark H. | Unopposed | | |
| Conservative | Hall M. Ms. | Unopposed | | |
| Turnout | | 0 | 0.0 | |
| Conservative hold | | | | |
| Conservative hold | | | | |

=== Park ===
Park (3 seats)
| Party | Candidate | Votes | % | ±% |
|---|---|---|---|---|
| Liberal | Woodhouse J. Ms. | Unopposed | | |
| Residents | Hoyle F. | Unopposed | | |
| Conservative | Fieldhouse P. Ms. | Unopposed | | |
| Turnout | | 0 | 0.0 | |
| Liberal hold | | | | |
| Residents hold | | | | |
| Conservative hold | | | | |

=== Ribby With Wrea ===
Ribby With Wrea (1 seat)
| Party | Candidate | Votes | % | ±% |
|---|---|---|---|---|
| Conservative | Warbrick G. | Unopposed | | |
| Turnout | | 0 | 0.0 | |
| Conservative gain from Independent | | | | |

=== Singleton & Greenhalgh ===
Singleton & Greenhalgh (1 seat)
| Party | Candidate | Votes | % | ±% |
|---|---|---|---|---|
| Independent | Cumming-Miller H. Ms. | Unopposed | | |
| Turnout | | 0 | 0.0 | |
| Independent hold | | | | |

=== St. Johns ===
St. Johns (3 seats)
| Party | Candidate | Votes | % | ±% |
|---|---|---|---|---|
| Conservative | Bamber E. | 951 | 34.9 | |
| Labour | Callon W. | 776 | 28.5 | |
| Residents | Hoyle J. Ms. | 674 | 24.8 | |
| Conservative | Finn V. Ms. | 650 | | |
| Conservative | Hood D. | 554 | | |
| Labour | Simpson P. | 331 | 11.8 | |
| Liberal | Armer T. | 322 | | |
| Labour | Millar R. | 308 | | |
| Turnout | | | 48.0 | |
| Conservative hold | | | | |
| Labour hold | | | | |
| Residents gain from Conservative | | | | |

=== St. Leonards ===
St. Leonards (3 seats)
| Party | Candidate | Votes | % | ±% |
|---|---|---|---|---|
| Conservative | Abbott W. | 700 | 26.2 | |
| Conservative | Woodhead I. | 686 | | |
| Residents | Longstaff J. | 686 | 25.7 | |
| Residents | Green B. Ms. | 684 | | |
| Independent | Jenkins T. | 537 | 20.1 | |
| Liberal | Chatwin N. Ms. | 498 | 18.6 | |
| Labour | Horridge N. | 250 | 9.4 | |
| Labour | Wilkinson P. Ms. | 203 | | |
| Labour | Izaks H. | 188 | | |
| Turnout | | | 41.0 | |
| Conservative hold | | | | |
| Conservative gain from Liberal | | | | |
| Residents hold | | | | |

=== Staining ===
Staining (1 seat)
| Party | Candidate | Votes | % | ±% |
|---|---|---|---|---|
| Conservative | Atkinson J. | Unopposed | | |
| Turnout | | 0 | 0.0 | |
| Conservative hold | | | | |

=== Weeton & Westby ===
Weeton & Westby (1 seat)
| Party | Candidate | Votes | % | ±% |
|---|---|---|---|---|
| Conservative | Bradley G. | Unopposed | | |
| Turnout | | 0 | 0.0 | |
| Conservative hold | | | | |
