= 1983 Rochford District Council election =

1983 English local election

- 5 May 1983

12 out of 40 seats to Rochford District Council 21 seats needed for a majority

	First party	Second party	Third party
Party	Conservative	Alliance	Labour
Seats won	8	4	0
Seats after	26	6	3
Seat change	▼1	▲2	Steady
Popular vote	6,948	4,555	1,584
Percentage	52.2%	34.2%	11.9%
Swing	▲4.2%	▲5.5%	▼4.2%
	Fourth party	Fifth party
Party	Residents	Independent
Seats won	0	0
Seats after	3	2
Seat change	Steady	▼1
Popular vote	did not stand	did not stand
Percentage	did not stand	did not stand
Swing	▼5.1%	▼2.1%
Council control before election
Conservative
Council control after election
Conservative

The 1983 Rochford District Council election took place on 5 May 1983 to elect members of Rochford District Council in Essex, England. This was on the same day as other local elections.

== Summary ==
=== Election result ===
1983 Rochford District Council election
Party	This election			Full council			This election		
Party	Seats	Net	Seats %	Other	Total	Total %	Votes	Votes %	+/−
Conservative	8	▼1	66.7	18	26	65.0	6,948	52.2	+4.2
Alliance	4	▲2	33.3	2	6	15.0	4,555	34.2	+5.5
Labour	0	Steady	0.0	3	3	7.5	1,584	11.9	–4.2
Residents	0	Steady	0.0	3	3	7.5	N/A	N/A	–5.1
Independent	0	▼1	0.0	2	2	5.0	N/A	N/A	–2.1
Independent Labour	0	Steady	0.0	0	0	0.0	229	1.7	N/A

== Ward results ==
Incumbent councillors standing for re-election are marked with an asterisk (*).

=== Ashingdon ===
Ashingdon
Party	Candidate	Votes	%	±%
Alliance	B. Crick*	458	44.3	–1.7
Conservative	J. Nicholas-Nicholls	456	44.1	–9.9
Labour	F. Denny	121	11.7	N/A
Majority		2	0.2	N/A
Turnout		1,035	45.4	+3.4
Registered electors		2,278		
Alliance hold		Swing	▲4.1	

=== Barling & Sutton ===
Barling & Sutton
Party	Candidate	Votes	%	±%
Conservative	P. Hawke	310	50.5	N/A
Alliance	V. Sullivan	304	49.5	N/A
Majority		6	1.0	N/A
Turnout		614	49.3	N/A
Registered electors		1,246		
Conservative hold				

=== Canewdon ===
Canewdon
Party	Candidate	Votes	%	±%
Conservative	D. Wood*	472	67.8	+32.7
Labour	M. Weir	224	32.2	N/A
Majority		248	35.6	N/A
Turnout		696	42.5	–35.1
Registered electors		1,638		
Conservative gain from Independent				

=== Foulness & Great Wakering East ===
Foulness & Great Wakering East
Party	Candidate	Votes	%	±%
Conservative	R. Pearson*	441	59.6	+12.5
Independent Labour	W. Lay	299	40.4	N/A
Majority		142	19.2	–0.4
Turnout		740	45.7	–33.5
Registered electors		1,599		
Conservative hold				

=== Grange & Rawreth ===
Grange & Rawreth
Party	Candidate	Votes	%	±%
Conservative	E. Heath*	706	43.9	+6.0
Alliance	M. Rapley	588	36.5	+5.2
Labour	R. Ellis	316	19.6	–11.2
Majority		118	7.3	+0.7
Turnout		1,610	37.0	–2.8
Registered electors		4,346		
Conservative hold		Swing	▲0.4	

=== Great Wakering Central ===
Great Wakering Central
Party	Candidate	Votes	%	±%
Alliance	P. Gwinnell	304	53.0	N/A
Conservative	F. Jopson*	270	47.0	+12.1
Majority		34	5.9	N/A
Turnout		574	46.9	–35.3
Registered electors		1,223		
Alliance gain from Conservative				

=== Hawkwell East ===
Hawkwell East
Party	Candidate	Votes	%	±%
Conservative	A. Harvey*	889	59.5	+5.3
Alliance	C. Brown	306	20.5	–4.6
Labour	D. Weir	300	20.1	–0.7
Majority		583	39.0	N/A
Turnout		1,495	33.6	–7.5
Registered electors		4,449		
Conservative hold		Swing	▲5.0	

=== Hawkwell West ===
Hawkwell West
Party	Candidate	Votes	%	±%
Conservative	J. Fawell	552	51.8	+7.7
Alliance	K. Saunders	281	26.4	N/A
Labour	G. Plackett	232	21.8	+9.0
Majority		271	25.4	+24.4
Turnout		1,065	36.0	–12.7
Registered electors		2,957		
Conservative hold				

=== Lodge ===
Lodge
Party	Candidate	Votes	%	±%
Conservative	P. Cooke*	1,162	61.3	+1.6
Alliance	M. Menning	484	25.5	–3.5
Labour	C. Barnaby	249	13.1	+1.8
Majority		678	35.8	+5.2
Turnout		1,895	40.8	+1.4
Registered electors		4,639		
Conservative hold		Swing	▲2.6	

=== Trinity ===
Trinity
Party	Candidate	Votes	%	±%
Alliance	D. Helson*	810	59.9	–3.4
Conservative	S. Easter	543	40.1	+7.0
Majority		267	19.7	–10.5
Turnout		1,353	48.1	–4.9
Registered electors		2,810		
Alliance hold		Swing	▼5.2	

=== Wheatley ===
Wheatley
Party	Candidate	Votes	%	±%
Alliance	T. Dean	604	53.6	+17.9
Conservative	R. Holman*	522	46.4	–17.9
Majority		82	7.3	N/A
Turnout		1,126	46.6	+1.4
Registered electors		2,415		
Alliance gain from Conservative		Swing	▲17.9	

=== Whitehouse ===
Whitehouse
Party	Candidate	Votes	%	±%
Conservative	J. Gibson*	625	52.8	–1.9
Alliance	J. Gordon	416	35.2	–0.2
Labour	J. Foley	142	12.0	+2.0
Majority		209	17.7	–1.6
Turnout		1,183	45.7	+5.7
Registered electors		2,590		
Conservative hold		Swing	▼0.9	
