= 1983 Worthing Borough Council election =

1983 English local election

- 5 May 1983

All 36 seats to Worthing Borough Council 19 seats needed for a majority

	First party	Second party
Party	Conservative	Alliance
Seats won	24	12
Seat change	▲8	▲3
Popular vote	54,183	40,158
Percentage	55.9%	41.4%
Council control before election
Conservative
Council control after election
Conservative

The 1983 Worthing Borough Council election took place on 5 May 1983 to elect members of Worthing Borough Council in West Sussex, England. This was on the same day as other local elections.

The whole council was up for election on new ward boundaries and the total number of seats on the council increased by 6, from 30 to 36.

== Summary ==
=== Election result ===
1983 Worthing Borough Council election
Party	Candidates	Seats	Gains	Losses	Net gain/loss	Seats %	Votes %	Votes	+/−
Conservative	36	24	7	4	▲8	66.7	55.9	54,183	
Alliance	35	12	4	2	▲3	33.3	41.4	40,158	
Labour	4	0	0	0	Steady	0.0	1.5	1,448	
Residents	3	0	0	5	▼5	0.0	1.2	1,212	

== Ward results ==
=== Broadwater ===
Broadwater (3 seats)
Party	Candidate	Votes	%	±%
Alliance	A. Clare*	1,539	50.5	
Alliance	A. Dockerty*	1,406	46.2	
Alliance	P. Otway	1,286	42.2	
Conservative	B. Kemp	1,211	39.8	
Conservative	G. Lissenburg	1,149	37.7	
Conservative	L. Golland	1,081	35.5	
Labour	P. Brook	297	9.8	
Turnout		3,045	46.3	
Registered electors		6,577		
Alliance hold				
Alliance hold				
Alliance hold				

=== Castle ===
Castle (3 seats)
Party	Candidate	Votes	%	±%
Alliance	J. Horgan	1,507	57.2	
Alliance	D. Chapman	1,485	56.4	
Alliance	J. Neal	1,434	54.4	
Conservative	D. Grady	1,127	42.8	
Conservative	E. Popplestone	1,086	41.2	
Conservative	L. Lee	1,076	40.8	
Turnout		2,635	40.8	
Registered electors		6,458		
Alliance gain from Conservative				
Alliance gain from Conservative				
Alliance gain from Conservative				

=== Central ===
Central (3 seats)
Party	Candidate	Votes	%	±%
Alliance	J. Bennett	919	43.8	
Conservative	A. Macmillan	890	42.4	
Conservative	A. Beaumont	875	41.7	
Conservative	R. Price	840	40.0	
Alliance	I. Ellis	718	34.2	
Alliance	V. Cave	701	33.4	
Labour	D. Poole	287	13.7	
Turnout		2,098	37.9	
Registered electors		5,536		
Alliance gain from Conservative				
Conservative hold				
Conservative hold				

=== Durrington ===
Durrington (3 seats)
Party	Candidate	Votes	%	±%
Conservative	J. Cotton	1,522	50.2	
Alliance	K. Moore	1,512	49.9	
Conservative	P. Knowles	1,477	48.7	
Conservative	R. Elkins	1,455	48.0	
Alliance	D. Marlow*	1,454	48.0	
Alliance	D. Barfield	1,449	47.8	
Turnout		3,032	47.7	
Registered electors		6,357		
Conservative gain from Alliance				
Alliance hold				
Conservative gain from Alliance				

=== Gaisford ===
Gaisford (3 seats)
Party	Candidate	Votes	%
Alliance	P. Bennett*	1,376	52.1
Alliance	R. Ketley	1,337	50.7
Alliance	D. Wagon	1,332	50.5
Conservative	B. Piggott	1,266	48.0
Conservative	A. Gambrill	1,196	45.3
Conservative	S. Cambridge	1,191	45.1
Turnout		2,639	41.1
Registered electors		6,421	
Alliance win (new seat)			
Alliance win (new seat)			
Alliance win (new seat)			

=== Goring ===
Goring (3 seats)
Party	Candidate	Votes	%	±%
Conservative	B. Lynn	2,144	53.5	
Conservative	M. Clinch	2,140	53.4	
Conservative	C. Cable-Robbie	2,120	52.9	
Alliance	I. Sweetko	1,859	46.4	
Alliance	M. Nash	1,516	37.9	
Alliance	B. Dawson	1,472	36.8	
Turnout		4,005	58.6	
Registered electors		6,835		
Conservative gain from Residents				
Conservative gain from Residents				
Conservative gain from Residents				

=== Heene ===
Heene (3 seats)
Party	Candidate	Votes	%	±%
Conservative	H. Piggott*	1,950	77.1	
Conservative	G. Collinson	1,855	73.3	
Conservative	S. Moore	1,790	70.8	
Alliance	B. Mitchell	580	22.9	
Alliance	M. Meredith	541	21.4	
Alliance	C. Hassall	529	20.9	
Turnout		2,530	39.2	
Registered electors		6,453		
Conservative hold				
Conservative hold				
Conservative hold				

=== Marine ===
Marine (3 seats)
Party	Candidate	Votes	%	±%
Conservative	D. Hill*	1,866	61.1	
Conservative	E. McDonald	1,828	59.8	
Conservative	M. Parkin	1,764	57.7	
Alliance	T. Chapman	630	20.6	
Alliance	A. Venamore	601	19.7	
Alliance	D. Oliver	586	19.2	
Residents	L. Hill*	558	18.3	
Residents	J. Fludgate	445	14.6	
Turnout		3,056	48.5	
Registered electors		6,301		
Conservative hold				
Conservative gain from Residents				
Conservative gain from Residents				

=== Offington ===
Offington (3 seats)
Party	Candidate	Votes	%	±%
Conservative	C. Scott*	1,980	65.5	
Conservative	I. Sinnott	1,973	65.4	
Conservative	S. Elliott*	1,940	64.3	
Alliance	G. Meredith	828	27.5	
Alliance	E. Thomas	809	26.8	
Alliance	B. Jones	803	26.6	
Residents	D. Hecht	209	6.9	
Turnout		3,016	49.9	
Registered electors		6,043		
Conservative hold				
Conservative hold				
Conservative hold				

=== Salvington ===
Salvington (3 seats)
Party	Candidate	Votes	%
Conservative	H. Braden	1,871	55.8
Conservative	B. Howlett	1,781	53.1
Conservative	S. Bennett	1,729	51.6
Alliance	E. Blackman	1,484	44.3
Alliance	B. McLuskie	1,413	42.2
Alliance	J. Crabtree	1,354	40.4
Turnout		3,352	50.4
Registered electors		6,651	
Conservative win (new seat)			
Conservative win (new seat)			
Conservative win (new seat)			

=== Selden ===
Selden (3 seats)
Party	Candidate	Votes	%	±%
Conservative	J. Chowen*	1,349	51.8	
Conservative	M. Wilton	1,169	44.9	
Conservative	E. Baird	1,142	43.9	
Alliance	L. De Pinna	816	31.3	
Alliance	R. Monk	785	30.2	
Labour	J. Austin	439	16.9	
Labour	B. Croft	425	16.3	
Turnout		2,603	41.4	
Registered electors		6,287		
Conservative hold				
Conservative hold				
Conservative hold				

=== Tarring ===
Tarring (3 seats)
Party	Candidate	Votes	%
Conservative	H. Yates	1,506	51.6
Conservative	K. Young	1,438	49.2
Alliance	V. Harvey	1,413	48.4
Conservative	S. Todd	1,406	48.1
Alliance	P. Green*	1,386	47.4
Alliance	V. O'Callaghan	1,298	44.4
Turnout		2,921	44.6
Registered electors		6,549	
Conservative win (new seat)			
Conservative win (new seat)			
Alliance win (new seat)			
