= 1983 St Edmundsbury Borough Council election =

1983 English local government election

- 5 May 1983

All 44 seats to St Edmundsbury Borough Council 23 seats needed for a majority

| | First party | Second party |
|---|---|---|
| Party | Conservative | Labour |
| Seats won | 30 | 9 |
| Seat change | ▼2 | ▲1 |
| Popular vote | 14,981 | 7,814 |
| Percentage | 52.6% | 27.5% |
| Swing | ▼2.2% | ▼8.0% |
| | Third party | Fourth party |
| Party | Alliance | Independent |
| Seats won | 3 | 2 |
| Seat change | ▲2 | ▼1 |
| Popular vote | 4,697 | 494 |
| Percentage | 16.5% | 1.7% |
| Swing | ▲13.6% | ▼4.1% |
- Winner of each seat at the 1983 St Edmundsbury Borough Council election.
Council control before election
Conservative
Council control after election
Conservative

The 1983 St Edmundsbury Borough Council election took place on 5 May 1983 to elect members of St Edmundsbury Borough Council in Suffolk, England. This was on the same day as other local elections.

== Summary ==
=== Election result ===
1983 St Edmundsbury Borough Council election
| Party | Candidates | Seats | Gains | Losses | Net gain/loss | Seats % | Votes % | Votes | +/− |
|---|---|---|---|---|---|---|---|---|---|
| Conservative | 36 | 30 | 2 | 4 | ▼2 | 68.2 | 52.6 | 14,981 | –2.2 |
| Labour | 26 | 9 | 2 | 1 | ▲1 | 20.5 | 27.5 | 7,814 | –8.0 |
| Alliance | 11 | 3 | 2 | 0 | ▲2 | 6.8 | 16.5 | 4,697 | +13.6 |
| Independent | 2 | 2 | 0 | 1 | ▼1 | 4.5 | 1.7 | 494 | –4.1 |
| Ecology | 3 | 0 | 0 | 0 | Steady | 0.0 | 1.7 | 470 | N/A |

== Ward results ==
Incumbent councillors standing for re-election are marked with an asterisk (*). Changes in seats do not take into account by-elections or defections.

=== Abbeygate ===
Abbeygate (2 seats)
| Party | Candidate | Votes | % | ±% |
|---|---|---|---|---|
| Conservative | F. Jepson* | 727 | 72.3 | |
| Conservative | A. Biggs* | 675 | 67.2 | |
| Labour | M. Hanlon | 278 | 27.7 | |
| Turnout | | ~1,005 | 38.9 | |
| Registered electors | | 2,585 | | |
| Conservative hold | | | | |
| Conservative hold | | | | |

=== Barningham ===
Barningham
| Party | Candidate | Votes | % | ±% |
|---|---|---|---|---|
| Conservative | W. Hatten* | Unopposed | | |
| Registered electors | | 1,578 | | |
| Conservative hold | | | | |

=== Barrow ===
Barrow
| Party | Candidate | Votes | % | ±% |
|---|---|---|---|---|
| Conservative | P. English* | Unopposed | | |
| Registered electors | | 1,398 | | |
| Conservative hold | | | | |

=== Cangle ===
Cangle (2 seats)
| Party | Candidate | Votes | % | ±% |
|---|---|---|---|---|
| Conservative | G. Rushbrook* | 735 | 44.3 | |
| Labour | G. Kiernan | 480 | 28.9 | |
| Conservative | J. Savage* | 458 | 27.6 | |
| Alliance | A. Walker | 445 | 26.8 | |
| Labour | R. Otley | 424 | 25.5 | |
| Turnout | | ~1,659 | 47.9 | |
| Registered electors | | 3,463 | | |
| Conservative hold | | | | |
| Labour gain from Conservative | | | | |

=== Castle ===
Castle
| Party | Candidate | Votes | % | ±% |
|---|---|---|---|---|
| Labour | W. Elkins* | Unopposed | | |
| Registered electors | | 1,655 | | |
| Labour hold | | | | |

=== Cavendish ===
Cavendish
| Party | Candidate | Votes | % | ±% |
|---|---|---|---|---|
| Conservative | J. Wayman* | Unopposed | | |
| Registered electors | | 1,263 | | |
| Conservative hold | | | | |

=== Chalkstone ===
Chalkstone (2 seats)
| Party | Candidate | Votes | % | ±% |
|---|---|---|---|---|
| Conservative | M. Richards | 543 | 40.4 | |
| Labour | B. Easteal* | 454 | 33.8 | |
| Labour | R. King* | 441 | 32.8 | |
| Alliance | A. Cheer | 347 | 25.8 | |
| Turnout | | ~1,345 | 43.6 | |
| Registered electors | | 3,084 | | |
| Conservative gain from Labour | | | | |
| Labour hold | | | | |

=== Chevington ===
Chevington
| Party | Candidate | Votes | % | ±% |
|---|---|---|---|---|
| Conservative | N. Aitkens | 567 | 65.9 | |
| Alliance | B. Wilkes | 294 | 34.1 | |
| Majority | | 273 | 31.8 | |
| Turnout | | 861 | 60.2 | |
| Registered electors | | 1,430 | | |
| Conservative hold | | Swing | | |

=== Clare ===
Clare
| Party | Candidate | Votes | % | ±% |
|---|---|---|---|---|
| Conservative | J. Bone | 405 | 60.6 | |
| Labour | T. Shaw | 263 | 39.4 | |
| Majority | | 142 | 21.2 | |
| Turnout | | 668 | 43.9 | |
| Registered electors | | 1,521 | | |
| Conservative hold | | Swing | | |

=== Clements ===
Clements (2 seats)
| Party | Candidate | Votes | % | ±% |
|---|---|---|---|---|
| Labour | R. Basham | Unopposed | | |
| Labour | R. Hartley | Unopposed | | |
| Registered electors | | 2,537 | | |
| Labour hold | | | | |
| Labour hold | | | | |

=== Eastgate ===
Eastgate (2 seats)
| Party | Candidate | Votes | % | ±% |
|---|---|---|---|---|
| Conservative | B. Jennings* | 694 | 61.7 | |
| Conservative | R. Self* | 610 | 54.2 | |
| Labour | R. Nowak | 259 | 23.0 | |
| Labour | M. Kilner | 242 | 21.5 | |
| Ecology | G. Rynsard | 172 | 15.3 | |
| Turnout | | ~1,125 | 47.2 | |
| Registered electors | | 2,385 | | |
| Conservative hold | | | | |
| Conservative hold | | | | |

=== Fornham ===
Fornham
| Party | Candidate | Votes | % | ±% |
|---|---|---|---|---|
| Conservative | J. Warren | Unopposed | | |
| Registered electors | | 1,613 | | |
| Conservative gain from Independent | | | | |

=== Great Barton ===
Great Barton
| Party | Candidate | Votes | % | ±% |
|---|---|---|---|---|
| Conservative | C. Winsor* | Unopposed | | |
| Registered electors | | 1,444 | | |
| Conservative hold | | | | |

=== Honington ===
Honington
| Party | Candidate | Votes | % | ±% |
|---|---|---|---|---|
| Conservative | G. Starling* | Unopposed | | |
| Registered electors | | 1,117 | | |
| Conservative hold | | | | |

=== Horringer ===
Horringer (2 seats)
| Party | Candidate | Votes | % | ±% |
|---|---|---|---|---|
| Conservative | P. Underwood* | 763 | 62.8 | |
| Conservative | H. Dutson | 683 | 56.2 | |
| Alliance | I. Norris | 452 | 37.2 | |
| Turnout | | ~1,215 | 42.2 | |
| Registered electors | | 2,878 | | |
| Conservative hold | | | | |
| Conservative hold | | | | |

=== Hundon ===
Hundon
| Party | Candidate | Votes | % | ±% |
|---|---|---|---|---|
| Conservative | E. Bryant | Unopposed | | |
| Registered electors | | 1,580 | | |
| Conservative hold | | | | |

=== Ixworth ===
Ixworth
| Party | Candidate | Votes | % | ±% |
|---|---|---|---|---|
| Conservative | D. Cross* | 559 | 73.8 | |
| Labour | C. South | 198 | 26.2 | |
| Majority | | 361 | 47.6 | |
| Turnout | | 757 | 45.6 | |
| Registered electors | | 1,659 | | |
| Conservative hold | | Swing | | |

=== Kedington ===
Kedington
| Party | Candidate | Votes | % | ±% |
|---|---|---|---|---|
| Alliance | C. Jones | 430 | 53.5 | |
| Conservative | K. Curl | 294 | 36.6 | |
| Labour | G. Hatchett | 80 | 10.0 | |
| Majority | | 136 | 16.9 | |
| Turnout | | 804 | 48.4 | |
| Registered electors | | 1,661 | | |
| Alliance gain from Conservative | | Swing | | |

=== Northgate ===
Northgate (2 seats)
| Party | Candidate | Votes | % | ±% |
|---|---|---|---|---|
| Labour | E. Steele* | 555 | 39.4 | |
| Labour | D. Lockwood | 500 | 35.5 | |
| Conservative | E. Spooner* | 454 | 32.2 | |
| Alliance | A. Bignell | 401 | 28.4 | |
| Turnout | | ~1,410 | 56.4 | |
| Registered electors | | 2,499 | | |
| Labour hold | | | | |
| Labour gain from Conservative | | | | |

=== Pakenham ===
Pakenham
| Party | Candidate | Votes | % | ±% |
|---|---|---|---|---|
| Independent | N. Whitwell* | Unopposed | | |
| Registered electors | | 1,546 | | |
| Independent hold | | | | |

=== Risby ===
Risby
| Party | Candidate | Votes | % | ±% |
|---|---|---|---|---|
| Conservative | W. Conran* | Unopposed | | |
| Registered electors | | 1,439 | | |
| Conservative hold | | | | |

=== Risbygate ===
Risbygate (2 seats)
| Party | Candidate | Votes | % | ±% |
|---|---|---|---|---|
| Conservative | H. Marsh* | 576 | 42.5 | |
| Conservative | R. Houlton-Hart | 476 | 35.1 | |
| Labour | B. Ranger | 333 | 24.6 | |
| Alliance | S. Tanlyn | 282 | 20.8 | |
| Ecology | C. Whittaker | 165 | 12.2 | |
| Turnout | | ~1,355 | 53.2 | |
| Registered electors | | 2,551 | | |
| Conservative hold | | | | |
| Conservative hold | | | | |

=== Rougham ===
Rougham
| Party | Candidate | Votes | % | ±% |
|---|---|---|---|---|
| Independent | T. May* | 494 | 78.8 | |
| Ecology | P. Corke | 133 | 21.2 | |
| Majority | | 361 | 57.6 | |
| Turnout | | 627 | 41.7 | |
| Registered electors | | 1,503 | | |
| Independent hold | | Swing | | |

=== Sextons ===
Sextons (2 seats)
| Party | Candidate | Votes | % | ±% |
|---|---|---|---|---|
| Conservative | M. Lacey* | 779 | 63.6 | |
| Conservative | J. Knight* | 774 | 63.2 | |
| Labour | P. Woods | 446 | 36.4 | |
| Labour | A. Miller | 401 | 32.7 | |
| Turnout | | ~1,225 | 32.2 | |
| Registered electors | | 3,807 | | |
| Conservative hold | | | | |
| Conservative hold | | | | |

=== Southgate ===
Southgate (2 seats)
| Party | Candidate | Votes | % | ±% |
|---|---|---|---|---|
| Alliance | J. Williams* | 942 | 54.2 | |
| Alliance | K. Sturgeon | 801 | 46.1 | |
| Conservative | S. Pott* | 591 | 34.0 | |
| Conservative | A. Tarpley | 587 | 33.8 | |
| Labour | A. Robertson | 205 | 11.8 | |
| Labour | A. Rainbird | 179 | 10.3 | |
| Turnout | | ~1,738 | 52.0 | |
| Registered electors | | 3,344 | | |
| Alliance hold | | | | |
| Alliance gain from Conservative | | | | |

=== St. Marys & Helions ===
St. Marys & Helions
| Party | Candidate | Votes | % | ±% |
|---|---|---|---|---|
| Conservative | A. Horrigan* | 279 | 61.3 | |
| Labour | R. Phillips | 176 | 38.7 | |
| Majority | | 103 | 22.6 | |
| Turnout | | 455 | 38.0 | |
| Registered electors | | 1,186 | | |
| Conservative hold | | Swing | | |

=== St. Olaves ===
St. Olaves (2 seats)
| Party | Candidate | Votes | % | ±% |
|---|---|---|---|---|
| Labour | S. Wormleighton* | 684 | 75.5 | |
| Labour | W. Cownley* | 594 | 65.6 | |
| Conservative | M. Stonehouse | 222 | 24.5 | |
| Turnout | | ~906 | 32.8 | |
| Registered electors | | 2,761 | | |
| Labour hold | | | | |
| Labour hold | | | | |

=== Stanton ===
Stanton
| Party | Candidate | Votes | % | ±% |
|---|---|---|---|---|
| Conservative | P. Rudge* | 504 | 57.9 | |
| Labour | D. Pollard | 199 | 22.8 | |
| Alliance | T. Cook | 168 | 19.3 | |
| Majority | | 305 | 35.1 | |
| Turnout | | 871 | 47.8 | |
| Registered electors | | 1,821 | | |
| Conservative hold | | Swing | | |

=== Westgate ===
Westgate (2 seats)
| Party | Candidate | Votes | % | ±% |
|---|---|---|---|---|
| Conservative | W. Cutting* | 810 | 70.7 | |
| Conservative | D. Kempson* | 799 | 69.8 | |
| Labour | L. Robertson | 336 | 29.3 | |
| Turnout | | ~1,146 | 41.5 | |
| Registered electors | | 2,762 | | |
| Conservative hold | | | | |
| Conservative hold | | | | |

=== Whelnetham ===
Whelnetham
| Party | Candidate | Votes | % | ±% |
|---|---|---|---|---|
| Conservative | T. Clements | Unopposed | | |
| Registered electors | | 1,493 | | |
| Conservative hold | | | | |

=== Wickhambrook ===
Wickhambrook
| Party | Candidate | Votes | % | ±% |
|---|---|---|---|---|
| Conservative | J. Long* | Unopposed | | |
| Registered electors | | 1,460 | | |
| Conservative hold | | | | |

=== Withersfield ===
Withersfield
| Party | Candidate | Votes | % | ±% |
|---|---|---|---|---|
| Conservative | J. Mowbray* | 416 | 65.2 | |
| Alliance | J. Jones | 135 | 21.2 | |
| Labour | D. Hutchings | 87 | 13.6 | |
| Majority | | 281 | 44.0 | |
| Turnout | | 638 | 49.1 | |
| Registered electors | | 1,299 | | |
| Conservative hold | | Swing | | |
