= 1983 Welwyn Hatfield District Council election =

Welwyn Hatfield District Council election

- 8 May 1983

16 out of 43 seats to Welwyn Hatfield District Council 22 seats needed for a majority
- Turnout: 41,358, 56.4%

	First party	Second party	Third party
Party	Labour	Conservative	Alliance
Last election	25 seats, 37.4%	18 seats, 42.0%	0 seats, 20.5%
Seats before	25	18	0
Seats after	24	19	0
Seat change	▼1	▲1	Steady
Popular vote	15,396	20,124	6,990
Percentage	36.2%	47.3%	16.4%
Swing	▼1.2	▲5.3	▼4.1

The 1983 Welwyn Hatfield District Council election took place on 5 May 1983 to elect members of Welwyn Hatfield District Council in England. This was on the same day as other local elections. Around a third of the seats on the council were up for election. The results were relatively uneventful - the Conservatives gained a seat from Labour, but still fell very short of threatening Labour's majority on the council.

== Summary ==
=== Election result ===
1983 Welwyn Hatfield District Council election
Party	This election			Full council			This election		
Party	Seats	Net	Seats %	Other	Total	Total %	Votes	Votes %	+/−
Labour	7	▼1	43.8	17	24	55.8	15,396	36.2	–1.2
Conservative	9	▲1	56.3	10	19	44.2	20,124	47.3	+5.3
Alliance	0	Steady	0.0	0	0	0.0	6,990	16.4	–4.1
