= 1983 Wyre Borough Council election =

Election

- 5 May 1983

All 55 seats to Wyre Borough Council 28 seats needed for a majority

	First party	Second party	Third party
Party	Conservative	Labour	Liberal/SDP Alliance
Last election	40	4	2
Seats won	46	6	2
Seat change	▲6	▲3	=
	Fourth party
Party	Independent
Last election	10
Seats won	0
Seat change	▼10
Leader before election
Conservative
Leader after election
Conservative

The 1983 Wyre Borough Council election took place on 5 May 1983. It was the fourth election to Wyre Borough Council. This election was held on the same day as the 1983 United Kingdom local elections.

== Election result ==
1983 Wyre Borough Council
Party	Candidates	Seats	Gains	Losses	Net gain/loss	Seats %	Votes %	Votes	+/−
Conservative	56	46	10	3	▲7			41,557	
Labour	35	8	4	1	▲3			17,348	
Liberal/SDP Alliance	26	2	1	1	=			10,532	
Independent	1	0	0	10	▼10			304	

== Ward Results ==
=== Bailey ===
Bailey (3 seats)
Party	Candidate	Votes	%	±%
Labour	Hogston A.	778	46.2	
Labour	Wright D.	761		
Labour	Vink A.	749		
Conservative	Clarke E.	642	38.1	
Conservative	Clarke M. Ms.	621		
Conservative	Snowdon E.	552		
Liberal/SDP Alliance	Delaney T.	265	15.7	
Turnout		4,368	43.0	
Labour hold				
Labour gain from Independent				
Labour gain from Conservative				

=== Bourne ===
Bourne (3 seats)
Party	Candidate	Votes	%	±%
Labour	Goldsmith W.	1,241	52.6	
Conservative	Croft T.	1,120	47.4	
Conservative	McGrandle N. Ms.	969		
Labour	Stone P.	919		
Conservative	Dooney M. Ms.	907		
Labour	Beckett P. Ms.	857		
Turnout		5,013	48.0	
Labour hold				
Conservative hold				
Conservative hold				

=== Breck ===
Breck (2 seats)
Party	Candidate	Votes	%	±%
Conservative	Mellalieu E.	861	68.7	
Conservative	Macgregor R.	835		
Labour	Fail J.	392	31.3	
Labour	Norwood G.	373		
Turnout		2,461	52.9	
Conservative hold				
Conservative hold				

=== Brock ===
Brock (1 seat)
Party	Candidate	Votes	%	±%
Conservative	Fox A.	487	90.7	
Liberal/SDP Alliance	Hardie W.	50	9.3	
Turnout		537	43.0	
Conservative hold				

=== Calder ===
Calder (1 seat)
Party	Candidate	Votes	%	±%
Conservative	Ibison T.	418	83.9	
Liberal/SDP Alliance	Taylor G.	80	16.1	
Turnout		498	44.0	
Conservative hold				

=== Carleton ===
Carleton (2 seats)
Party	Candidate	Votes	%	±%
Conservative	Davis J.	1,291	68.6	
Conservative	Ward J.	1,194		
Labour	Jones D.	591	31.4	
Labour	Hammerton G.	476		
Turnout		3,552	51.9	
Conservative hold				
Conservative gain from Independent				

=== Catterall ===
Catterall (1 seat)
Party	Candidate	Votes	%	±%
Conservative	Greenwood R.	446	56.9	
Liberal/SDP Alliance	Sharples D.	338	43.1	
Turnout		784	55.0	
Conservative hold				

=== Cleveleys Park ===
Cleveleys Park (3 seats)
Party	Candidate	Votes	%	±%
Conservative	Berry C.	1,004	46.7	
Conservative	Bootle J.	978		
Conservative	Winnard R.	886		
Liberal/SDP Alliance	Smith M. Ms.	606	28.2	
Labour	Wright G. Ms.	542	25.2	
Labour	Taylor E. Ms.	526		
Turnout		4,542	46.0	
Conservative hold				
Conservative hold				
Conservative hold				

=== Duchy ===
Duchy (1 seat)
Party	Candidate	Votes	%	±%
Liberal/SDP Alliance	Simpson I.	512	61.9	
Conservative	Jackson J.	315	38.1	
Turnout		827	59.0	
Liberal/SDP Alliance gain from Conservative				

=== Garstang ===
Garstang (2 seats)
Party	Candidate	Votes	%	±%
Liberal/SDP Alliance	Herbert P.	1,203	56.2	
Conservative	Moreland F.	785	36.7	
Liberal/SDP Alliance	Busby J. Ms.	638		
Conservative	Hudson C. Ms.	382		
Labour	Phillips K.	153	7.1	
Turnout		3,161	61.0	
Liberal/SDP Alliance hold				
Conservative hold				

=== Great Eccleston ===
Great Eccleston (1 seat)
Party	Candidate	Votes	%	±%
Conservative	Jobson G.	587	49.5	
Liberal/SDP Alliance	Miller Y. Ms.	569	47.9	
Labour	Stephens C. Ms.	31	2.6	
Turnout		1,187	61.0	
Conservative hold				

=== Hambleton ===
Hambleton (2 seats)
Party	Candidate	Votes	%	±%
Conservative	Williamson R.	1,101	60.7	
Conservative	Roper G.	993		
Liberal/SDP Alliance	Moat L. Ms.	530	29.2	
Labour	Blackburn P.	184	10.1	
Turnout		2,808	44.8	
Conservative hold				
Conservative hold				

=== Hardhorn ===
Hardhorn (2 seats)
Party	Candidate	Votes	%	±%
Conservative	Stebbing C.	1,051	70.9	
Conservative	Bennett K.	995		
Liberal/SDP Alliance	Robert S. Ms.	277	18.7	
Labour	Stephens G.	154	10.4	
Turnout		2,477	54.0	
Conservative hold				
Conservative hold				

=== High Cross ===
High Cross (2 seats)
Party	Candidate	Votes	%	±%
Conservative	Anderson L. Ms.	835	56.2	
Conservative	Catlow P. Ms.	815		
Liberal/SDP Alliance	Frost C.	479	32.2	
Liberal/SDP Alliance	Robert A.	477		
Labour	Prowse L.	172	11.6	
Turnout		2,778	52.0	
Conservative hold				
Conservative gain from Independent				

=== Jubilee ===
Jubilee (2 seats)
Party	Candidate	Votes	%	±%
Conservative	Townend F.	Unopposed		
Conservative	Cropper K.	Unopposed		
Turnout		0	0.0	
Conservative hold				
Conservative gain from Independent				

=== Mount ===
Mount (2 seats)
Party	Candidate	Votes	%	±%
Conservative	Knight R.	664	47.3	
Conservative	Jolley L.	663		
Labour	Wareing G.	487	34.7	
Labour	Crowford R.	482		
Liberal/SDP Alliance	Hooley D.	253	18.0	
Liberal/SDP Alliance	Keighley R.	234		
Turnout		2,783	47.7	
Conservative gain from Independent				
Conservative gain from Independent				

=== Norcross ===
Norcross (2 seats)
Party	Candidate	Votes	%	±%
Conservative	Hough L. Ms.	739	53.6	
Conservative	Jordin L. Ms.	696		
Labour	Delaney S.	330	23.9	
Liberal/SDP Alliance	Hyland N. Ms.	310	22.5	
Liberal/SDP Alliance	Smith A.	252		
Turnout		2,327	44.8	
Conservative hold				
Conservative hold				

=== Park ===
Park (3 seats)
Party	Candidate	Votes	%	±%
Labour	Aspden J.	911	53.9	
Labour	Allen R.	736		
Labour	Stephenson B.	630		
Conservative	Howard T.	501	29.6	
Conservative	Underdown D.	468		
Conservative	Twist G.	452		
Liberal/SDP Alliance	Trafford T.	278	16.4	
Turnout		3,976	41.0	
Labour hold				
Labour gain from Independent				
Labour gain from Conservative				

=== Pharos ===
Pharos (2 seats)
Party	Candidate	Votes	%	±%
Conservative	Briggs M. Ms.	553	42.5	
Labour	Pilling J.	546	42.0	
Conservative	Nield J.	514		
Labour	Stables J.	404		
Liberal/SDP Alliance	Timmins P.	201	15.5	
Turnout		2,218	44.0	
Conservative hold				
Labour hold				

=== Pilling ===
Pilling (1 seat)
Party	Candidate	Votes	%	±%
Conservative	Watson R.	456	60.0	
Independent	Bleasdale T.	304	40.0	
Turnout		760	51.8	
Conservative hold				

=== Preesall ===
Preesall (3 seats)
Party	Candidate	Votes	%	±%
Conservative	Mutch J. Ms.	Unopposed		
Conservative	Davies M.	Unopposed		
Conservative	Brook P.	Unopposed		
Turnout		0	0.0	
Conservative hold				
Conservative hold				
Conservative hold				

=== Rossall ===
Rossall (3 seats)
Party	Candidate	Votes	%	±%
Conservative	Smith J. Ms.	950	52.7	
Conservative	King H.	948		
Conservative	Harrop J.	941		
Liberal/SDP Alliance	Rogers J. Ms.	551	30.6	
Liberal/SDP Alliance	Angel A.	512		
Liberal/SDP Alliance	Brandes D.	486		
Labour	Heap L.	302	16.7	
Labour	Oakley R.	298		
Labour	Muir R.	261		
Turnout		4,349	45.0	
Conservative gain from Independent				
Conservative gain from Independent				
Conservative gain from Independent				

=== Staina ===
Staina (3 seats)
Party	Candidate	Votes	%	±%
Conservative	Ashworth C.	1,341	62.8	
Conservative	Forsyth W.	1,249		
Conservative	Dickens T.	1,234		
Liberal/SDP Alliance	Battersby J.	398	18.6	
Labour	Hallows L.	396	18.5	
Turnout		4,618	45.5	
Conservative hold				
Conservative hold				
Conservative hold				

=== Tithebarn ===
Tithebarn (2 seats)
Party	Candidate	Votes	%	±%
Conservative	Baker D.	939	73.6	
Conservative	Stephens J.	782		
Labour	Wheatley M.	336	26.4	
Labour	Horrocks G.	288		
Turnout		2,345	51.8	
Conservative hold				
Conservative hold				

=== Victoria ===
Victoria (3 seats)
Party	Candidate	Votes	%	±%
Conservative	Grime J.	1,174	78.1	
Conservative	Preston S. Ms.	1,111		
Conservative	Powell G.	1,104		
Labour	Rimmer E.	329	21.9	
Turnout		3,718	43.0	
Conservative hold				
Conservative hold				
Conservative hold				

=== Warren ===
Warren (3 seats)
Party	Candidate	Votes	%	±%
Conservative	Formstone H.	905	48.0	
Conservative	Bradbury B. Ms.	849		
Conservative	Vincent A.	825		
Labour	Barlow M. Ms.	614	32.6	
Labour	Fail E.	560		
Labour	Stephenson E. Ms.	539		
Liberal/SDP Alliance	Jones C. Ms.	365	19.4	
Liberal/SDP Alliance	Bate S.	357		
Turnout		4,014	48.9	
Conservative hold				
Conservative hold				
Conservative gain from Labour				

=== Wyresdale ===
Wyresdale (1 seat)
Party	Candidate	Votes	%	±%
Conservative	Hardman J.	429	58.0	
Liberal/SDP Alliance	Nicholson W.	311	42.0	
Turnout		740	54.0	
Conservative gain from Liberal				
