= 1983 Luton Borough Council election =

Local election in England

- 5 May 1983

All 48 seats to Luton Borough Council 25 seats needed for a majority

	First party	Second party	Third party
Party	Conservative	Labour	Alliance
Seats won	25	17	6
Seat change	▼7	▲1	▲6
Popular vote	61,943	60,005	35,425
Percentage	39.2%	37.9%	22.4%
Swing	▼5.0%	▼1.2%	▲6.1%
Control before election
Conservative
Control after election
Conservative

The 1983 Luton Borough Council election took place on 5 May 1983 to elect members of Luton Borough Council in Bedfordshire, England. This was on the same day as other local elections.

== Summary ==
=== Election result ===
1983 Luton Borough Council election
Party	Candidates	Seats	Gains	Losses	Net gain/loss	Seats %	Votes %	Votes	+/−
Conservative	48	25	1	8	▼7	52.1	39.2	61,943	–5.0
Labour	48	17	2	1	▲1	35.4	37.9	60,005	–1.2
Alliance	48	6	6	0	▲6	12.5	22.4	35,425	+6.1
Independent	1	0	0	0	Steady	0.0	0.3	510	+0.3
Communist	2	0	0	0	Steady	0.0	0.2	287	N/A

== Ward results ==
Incumbent councillors standing for re-election are marked with an asterisk (*). Changes in seats do not take into account by-elections or defections.

=== Biscot ===
Biscot (3 seats)
Party	Candidate	Votes	%	±%
Labour	R. Davis	1,590	43.9	–1.8
Labour	D. Stewart	1,492	41.2	–4.0
Labour	M. Guha	1,491	41.1	–1.5
Conservative	K. Woodbridge	1,135	31.3	–6.2
Conservative	T. Lankester	1,078	29.7	–5.9
Conservative	S. Rizvi	990	27.3	–7.2
Independent	M. Hussain	510	14.1	N/A
Alliance	M. Gearty	387	10.7	–1.5
Alliance	L. Singh	305	8.4	–2.5
Alliance	G. Jacobi	283	7.8	–0.4
Turnout		~3,625	53.4	–20.4
Registered electors		6,789		
Labour hold				
Labour hold				
Labour hold				

=== Bramingham ===
Bramingham (3 seats)
Party	Candidate	Votes	%	±%
Conservative	P. Glenister*	1,124	46.1	–0.8
Conservative	F. Lester*	1,075	44.1	–0.2
Labour	R. Furness	1,043	42.8	+4.1
Conservative	R. Samuels	1,034	42.4	–1.0
Labour	E. Hunt	1,021	41.9	+4.0
Labour	S. Debgupta	976	40.0	+5.0
Alliance	C. Mead	272	11.2	–1.3
Alliance	Z. Ledez	263	10.8	–0.1
Alliance	L. McColm	252	10.3	–0.6
Turnout		~2,438	48.2	–27.6
Registered electors		5,058		
Conservative hold				
Conservative hold				
Labour gain from Conservative				

=== Challney ===
Challney (3 seats)
Party	Candidate	Votes	%	±%
Conservative	B. Dodd*	1,742	48.5	–1.7
Conservative	D. Burrett	1,702	47.4	–1.2
Conservative	M. McCarroll*	1,679	46.8	–1.0
Labour	J. McCafferty	1,203	33.5	–1.4
Labour	R. Lacey	1,132	31.5	–3.2
Labour	M. Ashraf	974	27.1	–5.8
Alliance	M. Chinchen	648	18.0	+5.8
Alliance	H. Roe	577	16.1	+5.5
Alliance	N. Singh	551	15.3	+6.8
Turnout		~3,591	45.0	–32.6
Registered electors		7,979		
Conservative hold				
Conservative hold				
Conservative hold				

=== Crawley ===
Crawley (3 seats)
Party	Candidate	Votes	%	±%
Alliance	D. Franks	2,084	49.7	+33.2
Alliance	M. Rowan	1,918	45.7	+30.2
Alliance	P. Chapman	1,912	45.6	+31.2
Conservative	P. Connell	1,060	25.3	–15.9
Conservative	A. Lucas*	1,054	25.1	–15.4
Labour	P. Lacey	1,048	25.0	–12.9
Labour	D. Taylor	1,025	24.4	–13.4
Labour	R. Macey	964	23.0	–11.5
Conservative	A. Ahuja	859	20.5	–18.8
Turnout		~4,195	50.7	–27.9
Registered electors		8,274		
Alliance gain from Conservative				
Alliance gain from Conservative				
Alliance gain from Conservative				

=== Dallow ===
Dallow (3 seats)
Party	Candidate	Votes	%	±%
Labour	M. Gulliver	1,894	58.3	+6.3
Labour	W. Pratt*	1,796	55.3	+4.2
Labour	R. Sills	1,754	54.0	+5.3
Alliance	C. Cason	708	21.8	+11.7
Alliance	S. Stephens	702	21.6	+12.0
Conservative	R. Lambert	647	19.9	–11.1
Conservative	H. Benson	645	19.9	–10.6
Alliance	J. Varnals	637	19.6	+11.4
Conservative	S. Webster	625	19.2	–9.1
Turnout		~3,249	44.0	–29.6
Registered electors		7,383		
Labour hold				
Labour hold				
Labour hold				

=== Farley ===
Farley (3 seats)
Party	Candidate	Votes	%	±%
Labour	L. McCowan	1,942	57.6	+5.5
Labour	D. Fuller	1,937	57.5	+6.0
Labour	W. McKenzie	1,867	55.4	+5.4
Conservative	R. Robinson	790	23.4	–5.7
Conservative	M. Cato	785	23.3	–5.3
Conservative	G. Portelli	738	21.9	–5.4
Alliance	G. Brown	469	13.9	+1.9
Alliance	J. Felmingham	450	13.4	+2.2
Alliance	V. Adika	381	11.3	+1.2
Communist	A. McDonald	167	5.0	N/A
Turnout		~3,369	45.6	–27.8
Registered electors		7,388		
Labour hold				
Labour hold				
Labour hold				

=== High Town ===
High Town (3 seats)
Party	Candidate	Votes	%	±%
Labour	J. Fensome	1,100	36.4	+0.9
Conservative	A. Flint*	1,072	35.5	–8.5
Conservative	W. Addison	1,061	35.1	–8.4
Conservative	R. Dean	1,054	34.9	–6.8
Labour	S. Gonshor	980	32.4	+0.6
Labour	O. Devit	951	31.5	+2.7
Alliance	T. Keens	851	28.1	+8.6
Alliance	C. Jephson	736	24.3	+7.0
Alliance	H. Siederer	657	21.7	+9.4
Turnout		~3,024	45.7	–27.6
Registered electors		6,616		
Labour gain from Conservative				
Conservative hold				
Conservative hold				

=== Icknield ===
Icknield (3 seats)
Party	Candidate	Votes	%	±%
Conservative	R. Cartwright*	2,668	67.6	+0.6
Conservative	V. Dunington*	2,668	67.6	+1.0
Conservative	D. Johnston*	2,582	65.4	+1.2
Labour	L. Hughes	828	21.0	+1.1
Labour	E. Lurkings	761	19.3	–0.5
Labour	R. Lucas	759	19.2	+0.5
Alliance	M. Large	451	11.4	+0.9
Alliance	T. Perry	441	11.2	+1.6
Alliance	J. Smith	437	11.1	+2.2
Turnout		~2,946	50.4	–32.6
Registered electors		7,830		
Conservative hold				
Conservative hold				
Conservative hold				

=== Leagrave ===
Leagrave (3 seats)
Party	Candidate	Votes	%	±%
Conservative	M. Garrett*	1,610	45.5	+0.9
Conservative	J. Goldsmith*	1,394	39.4	–1.9
Conservative	M. Punter	1,352	38.2	–1.8
Labour	R. Robertson	1,350	38.1	–2.5
Labour	M. Lobo	1,310	37.0	–2.6
Labour	D. Thakoordin	1,259	35.6	–3.1
Alliance	T. Kenneally	578	16.3	+3.5
Alliance	S. Kenneally	565	16.0	+4.2
Alliance	R. Schweizer	488	13.8	+5.6
Turnout		~3,541	44.9	–31.0
Registered electors		7,886		
Conservative hold				
Conservative hold				
Conservative gain from Labour				

=== Lewsey ===
Lewsey (3 seats)
Party	Candidate	Votes	%	±%
Labour	J. Hamill	1,734	49.0	–1.4
Labour	D. Kennedy*	1,688	47.7	+2.0
Labour	M. Yasin	1,432	40.4	–2.8
Alliance	D. Degroot	894	25.2	+14.2
Alliance	D. Larkman	893	25.2	+14.2
Alliance	M. Paul	819	23.1	+12.4
Conservative	P. Lankester	803	22.7	–11.7
Conservative	D. Curd	798	22.5	–11.4
Conservative	R. Oakley	795	22.5	–9.2
Turnout		~3,541	40.4	–33.8
Registered electors		8,503		
Labour hold				
Labour hold				
Labour hold				

=== Limbury ===
Limbury (3 seats)
Party	Candidate	Votes	%	±%
Conservative	P. Locke	1,495	44.0	–1.8
Conservative	H. Mason	1,489	43.8	–1.3
Conservative	A. Scott	1,407	41.4	–2.7
Labour	R. Jeffries	1,210	35.6	–2.8
Labour	K. Cunliffe	1,129	33.2	–2.6
Labour	P. Broadhead	1,043	30.7	–4.4
Alliance	N. Collett	694	20.4	+5.1
Alliance	W. Johnston	646	19.0	+6.9
Alliance	P. McKenna	623	18.3	+6.7
Turnout		~3,397	45.5	–34.4
Registered electors		7,465		
Conservative hold				
Conservative hold				
Conservative hold				

=== Putteridge ===
Putteridge (3 seats)
Party	Candidate	Votes	%	±%
Alliance	R. Davies	1,670	39.7	+5.3
Conservative	L. Chantler*	1,495	35.6	–1.0
Alliance	D. Woodroffe	1,420	33.8	+3.1
Conservative	G. Payne	1,401	33.3	–2.6
Conservative	C. Skinner	1,387	33.0	–1.6
Alliance	C. Hinkley	1,363	32.4	+2.6
Labour	J. Gardner	1,040	24.7	–2.9
Labour	K. Cockfield	1,023	24.3	–2.3
Labour	K. Bruckdorfer	1,000	23.8	+0.4
Turnout		~4,203	52.9	–30.5
Registered electors		7,945		
Alliance gain from Conservative				
Conservative hold				
Alliance gain from Conservative				

=== Saints ===
Saints (3 seats)
Party	Candidate	Votes	%	±%
Conservative	W. Copeland*	1,680	47.2	–3.0
Conservative	T. Cunningham*	1,645	46.2	–2.3
Conservative	P. Wolsey	1,564	43.9	–3.4
Labour	R. Bramwell	1,337	37.5	+3.8
Labour	E. Nolan	1,307	36.7	+3.3
Labour	R. Shannon	1,290	36.2	+3.1
Alliance	J. Blindell	542	15.2	+3.0
Alliance	B. Murray	512	14.4	+2.3
Alliance	M. Robinson	499	14.0	+3.9
Turnout		~3,561	46.8	–31.1
Registered electors		7,609		
Conservative hold				
Conservative hold				
Conservative hold				

=== South ===
South (3 seats)
Party	Candidate	Votes	%	±%
Conservative	A. Bush*	1,448	49.8	+2.5
Conservative	L. Benson*	1,397	48.1	+1.8
Conservative	G. Boote	1,389	47.8	+1.8
Labour	K. Cowan	946	32.6	–2.3
Labour	R. Wratten	916	31.5	–2.9
Labour	I. Thorpe	906	31.2	–2.6
Alliance	P. Mandell	393	13.5	–0.8
Alliance	N. Roe	393	13.5	+1.2
Alliance	J. Roe	363	12.5	+0.5
Communist	C. Mitchell	120	4.1	N/A
Turnout		~2,906	39.2	–29.7
Registered electors		7,413		
Conservative hold				
Conservative hold				
Conservative hold				

=== Stopsley ===
Stopsley (3 seats)
Party	Candidate	Votes	%	±%
Conservative	G. Dillingham*	1,486	39.3	–2.7
Alliance	J. Davies	1,430	37.8	+12.5
Conservative	J. Lucas	1,409	37.3	–3.9
Conservative	R. Denny	1,379	36.5	–2.6
Alliance	M. Dolling	1,237	32.7	+10.7
Alliance	W. Cole	1,181	31.2	+9.8
Labour	R. Galbraith	866	22.9	–5.2
Labour	D. Fengl	844	22.3	–4.6
Labour	E. Scanlan	825	21.8	–3.8
Turnout		~3,779	53.0	–26.9
Registered electors		7,131		
Conservative hold				
Alliance gain from Conservative				
Conservative hold				

=== Sundon Park ===
Sundon Park (3 seats)
Party	Candidate	Votes	%	±%
Labour	W. Cooney*	1,751	49.7	+12.6
Labour	E. Haldane*	1,659	47.1	+11.1
Labour	J. Johnson	1,612	45.8	+11.5
Conservative	P. Evans	1,100	31.2	+2.9
Conservative	J. Goldsmith	1,087	30.9	+3.9
Conservative	C. Everard	1,066	30.3	+5.9
Alliance	J. Bizley	670	19.0	–14.2
Alliance	J. Gilmour	600	17.0	–15.7
Alliance	B. Wright	580	16.5	–10.3
Turnout		~3,522	45.4	–32.0
Registered electors		7,757		
Labour hold				
Labour hold				
Labour hold				
