= 1983 Lancaster City Council election =

Election

- 5 May 1983

All 60 seats to Lancaster City Council 31 seats needed for a majority

	First party	Second party	Third party
Party	Conservative	Labour	Liberal
Last election	37 seats	14 seats	3 seats
Seats won	37	15	6
Seat change	=	▲1	▲3
Popular vote	40,768	32,097	11,614
	Fourth party	Fifth party
Party	Residents	Independent
Last election	0 seat	6
Seats won	1	1
Seat change	▲1	▼5
Popular vote	5,400	2,959
Leader before election
Conservative
Leader after election
Conservative

The 1983 Lancaster City Council election took place on 5 May 1983. This was on the same day as other local elections in England.

== Summary ==
The election resulted in a Conservative majority hold.

=== Election result ===
1983 Lancaster City Council
Party	Candidates	Seats	Gains	Losses	Net gain/loss	Seats %	Votes %	Votes	+/−
Conservative	54	37	5	5				40,768	
Labour	44	15	5	4	▲1			32,097	
Residents	23	1	1		▲1			5,400	
Independent	5	1		5	▼5			2,959	
Liberal	21	6	3		▲3			11,614	

== Ward Results ==
=== Alexandra ===
Alexandra (3 seats)
Party	Candidate	Votes	%	±%
Labour	E. Garbutt	883	50.6	
Conservative	D. Kershaw	862	49.4	
Conservative	K. Warren	789		
Conservative	C. Bottomley	774		
Labour	T. Masheder	732		
Labour	T. Tattersall	670		
Turnout		4,710	43.7	
Labour hold				
Conservative hold				
Conservative hold				

=== Arkholme ===
Arkholme (1 seat)
Party	Candidate	Votes	%	±%
Conservative	J. Fairhurst Ms.	520	72.6	
Liberal	D. Wood	196	27.4	
Turnout		716	60.9	
Conservative hold				

=== Bolton-Le-Sands ===
Bolton-Le-Sands (2 seats)
Party	Candidate	Votes	%	±%
Conservative	A. Briggs	Unopposed		
Conservative	W. Rigg	Unopposed		
Turnout		0	0.0	
Conservative hold				
Conservative hold				

=== Bulk ===
Bulk (3 seats)
Party	Candidate	Votes	%	±%
Labour	A. Bryning	1,325	53.0	
Labour	J. Yates Ms.	1,249		
Labour	I. Barker	1,221		
Conservative	R. Slater	509	20.4	
Liberal	A. Orlowski Ms.	354	14.2	
Liberal	A. Gee	333		
Residents	A. Buczynski	310	12.4	
Residents	M. Varey	274		
Residents	S. Arsmtrong Ms.	267		
Turnout		5,942	46.0	
Labour hold				
Labour hold				
Labour hold				

=== Carnforth ===
Carnforth (2 seats)
Party	Candidate	Votes	%	±%
Conservative	E. Watson	798	52.5	
Labour	E. Jones Ms.	722	47.5	
Labour	E. Clarke Ms.	557		
Turnout		2,077	38.5	
Conservative gain from Labour				
Labour hold				

=== Castle ===
Castle (3 seats)
Party	Candidate	Votes	%	±%
Labour	S. Henig	1,240	44.4	
Labour	L. Shaw	1,211		
Labour	P. Rye	1,119		
Conservative	K. Bowker	846	30.3	
Conservative	D. Dodd	810		
Conservative	G. Lowthion	739		
Liberal	J. Fender	434	15.5	
Liberal	D. Towers	383		
Residents	G. Woodhead	274	9.8	
Residents	E. Fisher Ms.	240		
Residents	E. Bailey	203		
Turnout		7,499	52.3	
Labour gain from Conservative				
Labour hold				
Labour hold				

=== Caton ===
Caton (2 seats)
Party	Candidate	Votes	%	±%
Liberal	S. Mews	991	55.5	
Liberal	M. Rushton Ms.	791		
Conservative	M. Williams Ms.	637	35.7	
Conservative	M. Potts Ms.	572		
Labour	T. Myall	156	8.7	
Labour	G. Barnes	152		
Turnout		3,299	61.0	
Liberal hold				
Liberal hold				

=== Ellel ===
Ellel (2 seats)
Party	Candidate	Votes	%	±%
Conservative	R. Carr	1,191	72.6	
Conservative	W. Kitchen	1,020		
Labour	W. Glaister	450	27.4	
Turnout		2,661	51.9	
Conservative hold				
Conservative hold				

=== Halton-With-Aughton ===
Halton-With-Aughton (1 seat)
Party	Candidate	Votes	%	±%
Conservative	H. Towers	418	40.0	
Liberal	R. Fenton Ms.	393	37.6	
Labour	D. Noonan	124	11.9	
Residents	P. Woodruff	110	10.5	
Turnout		1,045	57.0	
Conservative hold				

=== Harbour ===
Harbour (2 seats)
Party	Candidate	Votes	%	±%
Independent	D. Jackson	1,003	41.2	
Conservative	K. Brook	578	23.8	
Liberal	P. Kerwin	459	18.9	
Labour	C. Robinson	393	16.2	
Conservative	C. Simmons	367		
Labour	D. Robinson Ms.	263		
Turnout		3,063	54.5	
Independent hold				
Conservative hold				

=== Heysham Central ===
Heysham Central (2 seats)
Party	Candidate	Votes	%	±%
Residents	J. Taylor Ms.	887	44.2	
Conservative	B. Ford Ms.	809	40.3	
Conservative	R. Pettigrew	692		
Labour	J. Mackenzie	312	15.5	
Turnout		2,700	53.4	
Residents gain from Independent				
Conservative hold				

=== Heysham North ===
Heysham North (2 seats)
Party	Candidate	Votes	%	±%
Conservative	G. Bryan	650	38.5	
Conservative	M. Kennan	640		
Liberal	M. Clarke Ms.	585	34.7	
Labour	S. Ogle	453	26.8	
Turnout		2,328	43.8	
Conservative hold				
Conservative hold				

=== Heysham South ===
Heysham South (3 seats)
Party	Candidate	Votes	%	±%
Conservative	N. Pym	1,123	53.1	
Conservative	J. Rawnsley	1,105		
Conservative	F. Weller	1,097		
Labour	D. Beesley	992	46.9	
Labour	D. Slater	991		
Labour	M. Kewin Ms.	896		
Turnout		6,204	49.7	
Conservative gain from Labour				
Conservative hold				
Conservative gain from Independent				

=== Hornby ===
Hornby (1 seat)
Party	Candidate	Votes	%	±%
Conservative	T. Fletcher	460	60.5	
Liberal	E. Tinker Ms.	300	39.5	
Turnout		760	57.0	
Conservative hold				

=== John O'Gaunt ===
John O'Gaunt (3 seats)
Party	Candidate	Votes	%	±%
Liberal	B. Freeman	1,055	37.3	
Liberal	P. Walker	998		
Liberal	L. Boyle Ms.	929		
Labour	P. Kavanagh	911	32.2	
Labour	J. Gallacher	897		
Labour	G. Coats Ms.	887		
Conservative	J. Dougherty	694	24.5	
Conservative	P. Jamieson Ms.	669		
Conservative	S. Matthews Ms.	661		
Residents	S. Brooks Ms.	171	6.0	
Residents	D. Buczynski	145		
Residents	S. Hudson	134		
Turnout		8,039	52.0	
Liberal gain from Independent				
Liberal gain from Independent				
Liberal gain from Independent				

=== Kellet ===
Kellet (1 seat)
Party	Candidate	Votes	%	±%
Conservative	H. Shuttleworth Ms.	620	79.2	
Labour	J. Pratt	163	20.8	
Turnout		783	56.0	
Conservative hold				

=== Overton ===
Overton (1 seat)
Party	Candidate	Votes	%	±%
Conservative	W. Mashiter	Unopposed		
Turnout		0	0.0	
Conservative hold				

=== Parks ===
Parks (2 seats)
Party	Candidate	Votes	%	±%
Conservative	J. Race Ms.	1,158	79.5	
Conservative	J. Dawson	1,120		
Labour	B. Ogston	299	20.5	
Turnout		2,577	47.8	
Conservative hold				
Conservative hold				

=== Poulton ===
Poulton (3 seats)
Party	Candidate	Votes	%	±%
Conservative	S. Burns Ms.	997	63.9	
Conservative	W. Thornton	793		
Conservative	M. Bicker	793		
Independent	I. Woods Ms.	563	36.1	
Independent	I. Harrison	490		
Turnout		3,636	40.4	
Conservative hold				
Conservative hold				
Conservative hold				

=== Scotforth East ===
Scotforth East (3 seats)
Party	Candidate	Votes	%	±%
Conservative	R. Kenyon	933	35.3	
Conservative	G. Newsham	890		
Labour	J. Baker	890	33.7	
Labour	S. Denwood Ms.	860		
Labour	M. Bidmead Ms.	831		
Liberal	J. Gilbert	559	21.2	
Liberal	B. Austin	524		
Liberal	P. Horton	501		
Residents	J. Freeman	260	9.8	
Residents	J. Pacula	245		
Residents	C. Woods	170		
Turnout		7,163	46.4	
Conservative gain from Labour				
Conservative gain from Labour				
Labour hold				

=== Scotforth West ===
Scotforth West (3 seats)
Party	Candidate	Votes	%	±%
Conservative	E. Simpson	1,078	48.8	
Conservative	D. Sykes	1,024		
Conservative	J. Ball	997		
Labour	I. Clifford	711	32.2	
Labour	L. Robertson	691		
Labour	K. Barooah Ms.	655		
Residents	J. Pacula	422	19.1	
Turnout		5,578	47.1	
Conservative hold				
Conservative hold				
Conservative hold				

=== Silverdale ===
Silverdale (1 seat)
Party	Candidate	Votes	%	±%
Conservative	F. Wilson Ms.	428	47.1	
Independent	M. Thomas	290	31.9	
Labour	W. Mumford Ms.	191	21.0	
Turnout		909	53.8	
Conservative hold				

=== Skerton Central ===
Skerton Central (2 seats)
Party	Candidate	Votes	%	±%
Labour	D. Henderson Ms.	1,105	66.5	
Labour	J. Horner Ms.	983		
Liberal	P. Ruddy	323	19.4	
Residents	P. Woodruff	233	14.0	
Residents	B. Green	225		
Turnout		2,869	46.9	
Labour hold				
Labour hold				

=== Skerton East ===
Skerton East (2 seats)
Party	Candidate	Votes	%	±%
Labour	J. Lodge	753	57.4	
Labour	J. Scott	689		
Conservative	J. Richardson	476	36.3	
Conservative	J. Bulger	402		
Residents	A. Woodruff Ms.	82	6.3	
Residents	A. Macqueen	82		
Turnout		2,484	46.6	
Labour gain from Conservative				
Labour gain from Conservative				

=== Skerton West ===
Skerton West (2 seats)
Party	Candidate	Votes	%	±%
Conservative	J. Taylor Ms.	924	49.9	
Conservative	J. Stephenson	872		
Labour	T. Dawson	728	39.3	
Labour	A. Smith	697		
Residents	F. Brookes Ms.	201	10.8	
Residents	R. Armistead Ms.	146		
Turnout		3,568	49.0	
Conservative hold				
Conservative hold				

=== Slyne-With-Hest ===
Slyne-With-Hest (2 seats)
Party	Candidate	Votes	%	±%
Conservative	S. Rostron Ms.	883	43.6	
Conservative	F. Wilcox	777		
Independent	B. Kingsman	613	30.2	
Liberal	M. Jackson	418	20.6	
Residents	K. Greer	113	5.6	
Turnout		2,804	57.0	
Conservative hold				
Conservative hold				

=== Torrisholme ===
Torrisholme (2 seats)
Party	Candidate	Votes	%	±%
Conservative	P. Whitworth	1,274	74.4	
Conservative	J. Downey	1,208		
Labour	C. Page Ms.	439	25.6	
Turnout		2,921	49.1	
Conservative hold				
Conservative hold				

=== Victoria ===
Victoria (3 seats)
Party	Candidate	Votes	%	±%
Conservative	T. Shingler	907	34.0	
Labour	S. Booth	903	33.9	
Labour	M. Barr	862		
Conservative	S. King Ms.	858		
Labour	K. Dixon	838		
Conservative	W. Saville	826		
Liberal	R. Clarke	651	24.4	
Residents	A. Mewis	206	7.7	
Turnout		6,051	48.4	
Conservative hold				
Labour gain from Conservative				
Labour gain from Conservative				

=== Warton ===
Warton (1 seat)
Party	Candidate	Votes	%	±%
Liberal	C. Peacock	437	52.8	
Conservative	G. Parkes	391	47.2	
Turnout		828	45.2	
Liberal hold				
