= 1983 St Albans City and District Council election =

1983 English local election

The 1983 St Albans City and District Council election took place on 5 May 1983 to elect members of St Albans City and District Council in England. This was on the same day as other local elections.

== Summary ==
1983 St Albans City and District Council election
Party	This election			Full council			This election		
Party	Seats	Net	Seats %	Other	Total	Total %	Votes	Votes %	+/−
Conservative	12	▲1	60.0	18	30	52.6	23,786	47.4	+3.2
Alliance	4	▲2	20.0	12	17	29.8	16,414	32.7	–7.0
Labour	3	▼1	15.0	7	9	15.8	8,452	16.8	+1.1
Independent	1	▼1	5.0	1	1	1.8	1,414	2.8	+2.4
Ecology	0	Steady	0.0	0	0	0.0	127	0.3	N/A
Ind. Conservative	0	▼1	0.0	0	0	0.0	N/A	N/A	N/A

== Ward results ==
=== Ashley ===
Ashley
Party	Candidate	Votes	%	±%
Alliance	E. Aldridge	1,403	52.0	–2.6
Conservative	P. Welch	876	32.5	+1.2
Labour	C. Leet	420	15.6	+1.6
Majority		527	19.5	–3.8
Turnout		2,699	56.8	+5.5
Registered electors		4,783		
Alliance hold		Swing	▼1.9	

=== Batchwood ===
Batchwood
Party	Candidate	Votes	%	±%
Labour	P. Hiscott*	922	35.6	+1.2
Alliance	S. Ward	848	32.8	–2.6
Conservative	M. Dance	819	31.6	+1.5
Majority		74	2.9	N/A
Turnout		2,589	54.9	+7.1
Registered electors		4,718		
Labour hold		Swing	▲1.9	

=== Clarence ===
Clarence
Party	Candidate	Votes	%	±%
Conservative	I. Stebbings*	1,225	45.6	+4.3
Alliance	B. Bird	1,180	43.9	+1.1
Labour	P. Harris	280	10.4	–5.5
Majority		45	1.7	N/A
Turnout		2,685	60.5	+4.4
Registered electors		4,440		
Conservative hold		Swing	▲1.6	

=== Cunningham ===
Cunningham
Party	Candidate	Votes	%	±%
Alliance	M. Thompson	1,248	46.0	–1.0
Conservative	C. Ellis	961	35.4	–1.3
Labour	G. Maciver	505	18.6	+2.4
Majority		287	10.6	+0.3
Turnout		2,714	56.5	+6.2
Registered electors		4,804		
Alliance gain from Conservative		Swing	▲0.2	

=== Harpenden East ===
Harpenden East
Party	Candidate	Votes	%	±%
Conservative	G. McKenzie	1,135	41.8	–10.6
Alliance	N. Osmond	690	25.4	–11.4
Independent	H. Beck*	678	25.0	N/A
Labour	T. Morris	214	7.9	–2.8
Majority		445	16.4	+0.8
Turnout		2,717	52.7	+6.6
Registered electors		5,152		
Conservative gain from Ind. Conservative		Swing	▲0.4	

=== Harpenden North ===
Harpenden North
Party	Candidate	Votes	%	±%
Conservative	C. Curl*	1,707	60.3	+2.7
Alliance	R. Thoms	727	25.7	–5.8
Labour	D. Crew	272	9.6	–1.2
Ecology	H. Swailes	127	4.5	N/A
Majority		980	34.6	+19.0
Turnout		2,833	49.0	+2.9
Registered electors		5,778		
Conservative hold		Swing	▲4.3	

=== Harpenden South ===
Harpenden South
Party	Candidate	Votes	%	±%
Conservative	K. Nash	1,648	67.1	+9.5
Alliance	P. Jones	616	25.1	–4.1
Labour	C. Fryd	191	7.8	+1.9
Majority		1,032	42.0	+13.6
Turnout		2,455	48.5	+2.2
Registered electors		5,066		
Conservative hold		Swing	▲6.8	

No Independent candidate as previous (7.3%).

=== Harpenden West ===
Harpenden West
Party	Candidate	Votes	%	±%
Conservative	J. Cornforth	1,696	66.0	–0.2
Alliance	J. Little	619	24.1	–2.2
Labour	K. Griffin	253	9.9	+2.4
Majority		1,077	41.9	+2.0
Turnout		2,568	49.1	+2.8
Registered electors		5,196		
Conservative hold		Swing	▲1.0	

=== London Colney ===
London Colney
Party	Candidate	Votes	%	±%
Labour	L. Hayes	1,283	51.8	+0.5
Conservative	J. Kalaher	852	34.4	+4.5
Alliance	A. Sinagoga	341	13.8	–5.1
Majority		431	17.4	–4.0
Turnout		2,476	44.6	+5.2
Registered electors		5,546		
Labour hold		Swing	▼2.0	

=== Marshallwick North ===
Marshallwick North
Party	Candidate	Votes	%	±%
Conservative	K. Moody*	1,434	49.4	+11.0
Alliance	P. Halpin	1,148	39.6	–1.2
Labour	B. York	318	11.0	+1.9
Majority		286	9.9	N/A
Turnout		2,900	58.0	+6.2
Registered electors		5,002		
Conservative hold		Swing	▲6.1	

No Independent candidate as previous (11.7%).

=== Marshallwick South ===
Marshallwick South
Party	Candidate	Votes	%	±%
Conservative	O. Jennings	1,654	57.9	+7.5
Alliance	S. Coventry	880	30.8	–8.7
Labour	A. Goodsall	323	11.3	+1.2
Majority		774	27.1	+16.2
Turnout		2,857	55.2	+3.0
Registered electors		5,176		
Conservative hold		Swing	▲8.1	

=== Park Street ===
Park Street
Party	Candidate	Votes	%
Alliance	E. Cummins	960	41.9
Conservative	R. Scranage	832	36.3
Alliance	G. Bliss	821	35.8
Conservative	B. McArdie	814	35.5
Labour	M. Rogers	254	11.1
Labour	R. Fricker	186	8.1
Turnout		2,293	54.7
Registered electors		4,192	
Alliance hold			
Conservative hold			

=== Redbourn ===
Redbourn
Party	Candidate	Votes	%	±%
Conservative	T. Biggs	1,272	52.1	+1.3
Alliance	J. Bailey	781	32.0	–5.0
Labour	P. Rosen	387	15.9	+3.8
Majority		491	20.1	+6.3
Turnout		2,440	51.1	+4.6
Registered electors		4,464		
Conservative hold		Swing	▲3.2	

=== Sandridge ===
Sandridge
Party	Candidate	Votes	%	±%
Independent	B. Filmer*	736	59.4	–2.7
Conservative	D. Caroline	414	33.4	+7.5
Labour	C. Newbold	90	7.3	–4.7
Majority		322	26.0	–10.1
Turnout		1,240	54.3	–27.9
Registered electors		2,284		
Independent hold		Swing	▼5.1	

=== Sopwell ===
Sopwell
Party	Candidate	Votes	%	±%
Labour	E. Hudson	1,076	46.8	+7.2
Alliance	G. Heaton	636	27.7	–4.9
Conservative	R. Anson	587	25.5	–2.3
Majority		440	19.1	+12.0
Turnout		2,299	49.3	+5.0
Registered electors		4,661		
Labour hold		Swing	▲6.1	

=== St. Peters ===
St. Peters
Party	Candidate	Votes	%	±%
Alliance	T. Pratt	874	39.4	–10.9
Conservative	R. Smith	775	34.9	+5.4
Labour	M. Fletcher	570	25.7	+5.5
Majority		99	4.5	–16.3
Turnout		2,219	51.1	±0.0
Registered electors		4,345		
Alliance gain from Labour		Swing	▼8.2	

=== St. Stephens ===
St. Stephens
Party	Candidate	Votes	%	±%
Conservative	I. Bickerton*	1,418	45.2	–3.7
Alliance	J. Kalaher	1,356	43.2	+4.6
Labour	R. Humphrey	362	11.5	–1.0
Majority		62	2.0	–8.4
Turnout		3,136	55.9	+5.4
Registered electors		5,614		
Conservative hold		Swing	▼4.2	

=== Verulam ===
Verulam
Party	Candidate	Votes	%	±%
Conservative	K. Davies	1,700	53.4	+6.9
Alliance	R. Baker	1,286	40.4	–7.1
Labour	M. Bromberg	198	6.2	+0.2
Majority		414	13.0	N/A
Turnout		3,184	62.7	+5.0
Registered electors		5,079		
Conservative hold		Swing	▲7.0	

=== Wheathampstead ===
Wheathampstead
Party	Candidate	Votes	%	±%
Conservative	B. Sparrow*	1,967	85.0	+36.0
Labour	N. Ord	348	15.0	+6.3
Majority		1,619	70.0	+63.3
Turnout		2,315	49.6	+2.7
Registered electors		4,671		
Conservative hold		Swing	▲14.9	

No Alliance candidate as previous (42.3%).
