= 1983 Leicester City Council election =

1983 English local election

The 1983 Leicester City Council election took place on 5 May 1983 to elect members of Leicester City Council in England. This was on the same day as other local elections.

Following this election, the council briefly moved from all-out to staggered council elections for the 1984 and 1986 elections.

== Summary ==
1983 Leicester City Council election
Party	Seats	Gains	Losses	Net gain/loss	Seats %	Votes %	Votes	+/−
Labour	40			▲9	71.4	49.0	87,460	+0.1
Conservative	16			▼1	28.6	38.0	67,811	–3.3
Alliance	0			Steady	0.0	11.4	20,300	+6.7
Indian Workers Association	0			Steady	0.0	0.9	1,575	N/A
Independent Labour	0			Steady	0.0	0.5	830	N/A
Ecology	0			Steady	0.0	0.2	383	N/A
Independent	0			Steady	0.0	0.1	123	–0.2
