= 1983 Birmingham City Council election =

1983 UK local government election

← 1982	5 May 1983	1984 →
	First party	Second party	Third party
Party	Conservative	Labour	Alliance
Seats won	60	55	2
Council control before election
Conservative
Council control after election
Conservative

The 1983 Birmingham City Council election took place on 5 May 1983 to elect members of Birmingham City Council in the West Midlands, England. One third of the council was up for election and the Conservative Party kept overall control of the council.

== Result ==
Birmingham local election result 1983
Party	Seats	Gains	Losses	Net gain/loss	Seats %	Votes %	Votes	+/−
Labour	20					42.3		▼1.4
Conservative	19					42.2		▼6.0
Alliance	0				0.0	14.4		▲8.5
Green	0				0.0	0.3		▲0.1
Independent	0				0.0	0.6		▲0.6
Others	0				0.0	0.3		▼1.8
