= 1983 Broxbourne Borough Council election =

1983 election in Broxbourne, England

Elections were held in 1983 to elect council members of the Broxbourne Borough Council, the local government authority of the borough of Broxbourne, Hertfordshire, England.

== Composition of expiring seats before election ==
Ward	Party	Incumbent Elected	Incumbent	Standing again?
Broxbourne	Conservative	1979	J E Ball	Yes
Bury Green	Conservative	1979	M Franklin	No
Cheshunt Central	Conservative	1979	L C Parker	Yes
Cheshunt North	Conservative	1979	D Moody	Yes
Flamstead End	Conservative	1979	J G E Swannell	Yes
Goffs Oak	Conservative	1979	J M Sanderson	No
Hoddesdon North	Conservative	1979	G C B Walker	Yes
Hoddesdon Town	Conservative	1979	J Scott	Yes
Rosedale	Conservative	1979	T Wright	Yes
Rye Park	Labour	1979	J H Davis	No
Theobalds	Conservative	1979	G F Ebeling	No
Waltham Cross North	Conservative	1979	D Forbes-Buckingham	No
Waltham Cross South	Labour	1979	D Cunningham	Yes
Wormley & Turnford	Conservative	1979	O G Alderman	Yes

== Election results ==
Broxbourne local election result 1983
Party	Seats	Gains	Losses	Net gain/loss	Seats %	Votes %	Votes	+/−
Conservative	12	1	2	-1	80.00	55.11	14,565	
Labour	1	0	1	-1	6.66	24.89	6,577	
Alliance	2	2	0	+2	13.34	20.00	5,286	

== Results summary ==
An election was held in 14 wards on 5 May 1983.

15 seats were contested (2 seats in Bury Green Ward)

The Conservative Party made a gain from the Labour Party in Rye Park Ward.

The SDP - Liberal Alliance made gains from the Conservative Party in Hoddesdon Town and Rosedale Wards

The political balance of the council following this election was:

- Conservative 32 seats
- Labour 6 seats
- SDP-Liberal Alliance 4 Seats

== Ward results ==
Broxbourne Ward Result 5 May 1983
Party	Candidate	Votes	%	±%
Conservative	Joyce Ball	1,371	67.07	
Alliance	Albert Jackson	498	24.36	
Labour	Robert King	175	8.57	
Majority		873		
Turnout		2,044	39.40	
Conservative hold		Swing		

Bury Green Ward Result 2 Seats 5 May 1983
Party	Candidate	Votes	%	±%
Conservative	Michael Hanson	1,209	23.98	
Conservative	Brian Creamer	1,205	23.91	
Labour	Roy Jorsan	1,110	22.02	
Labour	Simon Lazenbatt	1,035	20.53	
Alliance	Peter Kemp	255	5.06	
Alliance	Janet Bonus	227	4.50	
Turnout		5,041	50.40	
Conservative hold		Swing		

Cheshunt Central Ward Result 5 May 1983
Party	Candidate	Votes	%	±%
Conservative	Leslie Parker	1,001	67.18	
Labour	Julian Batsleer	282	18.93	
Alliance	Lesley Dines	207	13.89	
Majority		719		
Turnout		1,490	41.70	
Conservative hold		Swing		

Cheshunt North Ward Result 5 May 1983
Party	Candidate	Votes	%	±%
Conservative	Doris Moody	963	58.15	
Labour	George Ingle	414	25.00	
Alliance	Lawrence Talbot	279	16.85	
Majority		549		
Turnout		1,656	35.40	
Conservative hold		Swing		

Flamstead End Ward Result 5 May 1983
Party	Candidate	Votes	%	±%
Conservative	James Swannell	1,227	63.02	
Labour	Linda Purple	409	21.01	
Alliance	Sheila Seymour	311	15.97	
Majority		818		
Turnout		1,947	43.90	
Conservative hold		Swing		

Goffs Oak Ward Result 5 May 1983
Party	Candidate	Votes	%	±%
Conservative	Christina Rooke	1,027	75.46	
Alliance	Derianne Fisher	202	14.84	
Labour	Robert Dubow	132	9.70	
Majority		825		
Turnout		1,363	42.80	
Conservative hold		Swing		

Hoddesdon North Ward Result 5 May 1983
Party	Candidate	Votes	%	±%
Conservative	Gerald Walker	1,454	69.27	
Alliance	Patricia Waughray	423	20.15	
Labour	Ian Howard	222	10.58	
Majority		1,031		
Turnout		2,099	44.50	
Conservative hold		Swing		

Hoddesdon Town Ward Result 5 May 1983
Party	Candidate	Votes	%	±%
Alliance	Robert Chilton	918	45.16	
Conservative	John Scott	884	43.48	
Labour	Janet Batsleer	231	11.36	
Majority		34		
Turnout		2,033	44.60	
Alliance gain from Conservative		Swing		

Rosedale Ward Result 5 May 1983
Party	Candidate	Votes	%	±%
Alliance	Kenneth Fursse	470	41.48	
Conservative	Tom Wright	441	38.92	
Labour	Pat Whittheard	222	19.60	
Majority		29		
Turnout		1,133	55.40	
Alliance gain from Conservative		Swing		

Rye Park Ward Result 5 May 1983
Party	Candidate	Votes	%	±%
Conservative	Edwin Luther	895	43.45	
Labour	Paul Garratt	834	40.49	
Alliance	Janet Parisi	331	16.06	
Majority		61		
Turnout		2,060	46.00	
Conservative gain from Labour		Swing		

Theobalds Ward Result 5 May 1983
Party	Candidate	Votes	%	±%
Conservative	Roy Chaplow	926	59.86	
Labour	John Brown	379	24.50	
Alliance	Thomas Wade	242	15.64	
Majority		547		
Turnout		1,547	38.40	
Conservative hold		Swing		

Waltham Cross North Ward Result 5 May 1983
Party	Candidate	Votes	%	±%
Conservative	David Willis	736	57.95	
Labour	Graham Knight	325	25.59	
Alliance	Frances Wyatt	209	16.46	
Majority		411		
Turnout		1,270	40.50	
Conservative hold		Swing		

Waltham Cross South Ward Result 5 May 1983
Party	Candidate	Votes	%	±%
Labour	Daisy Cunningham	545	39.98	
Conservative	Patrick Kemp	455	33.38	
Alliance	James Emslie	363	26.64	
Majority		90		
Turnout		1,363	35.02	
Labour hold		Swing		

Wormley / Turnford Ward Result 5 May 1983
Party	Candidate	Votes	%	±%
Conservative	Oliver Alderman	771	55.71	
Alliance	Hilda Chart	351	25.36	
Labour	Jill Nugent	262	18.93	
Majority		420		
Turnout		1,384	34.60	
Conservative hold		Swing		
