= 1983 South Kesteven District Council election =

1983 UK local government election

South Kesteven District Council elections were held in South Kesteven in 1983.

== Results by ward ==
=== Deeping St James Ward ===
Deeping St James Election May 1983 - Three seats
Party	Candidate	Votes	%	±%
Liberal	Kenneth Mercer Joynson	1,178		
Liberal	Patricia E. Abel	1,132		
Liberal	Margaret W. E. Moyle	1,107		
Conservative	R Johnson	616		
Conservative	Leonard Eyre	577		
Conservative	Frederick R. Crowson	562		

=== Market and West Deeping Ward ===
Market and West Deeping May 1983 - Three seats
Party	Candidate	Votes	%	±%
Liberal	Reginald L. Ducker	908		
Liberal	Hazel R Perry	735		
Liberal	Raymond John Auger	717		
Independent	Edwin E. Jones	528		
Conservative	Eric J. Freeman	442		
Conservative	Marjorie Dobson	399		
Conservative	Francis Syrett	333		
