= Adur District Council elections =

Local government elections in West Sussex, England

Half of Adur District Council in West Sussex, England is elected every two years. Until 2003, the council was elected by thirds. Since the last boundary changes in 2004, 29 councillors have been elected from 14 wards.

== Council elections ==
Composition of the council
| Year | Conservative | Labour | Liberal Democrats (Note: Includes totals for the predecessors of the Liberal Democrats, the Liberal Party and SDP (both of which participated in the Alliance).) | Green (Note: Includes totals for the predecessors of the Green Party of England and Wales, the Ecology Party and Green Party UK.) | Reform | UKIP | Independents & Others | Council control after election |
|---|---|---|---|---|---|---|---|---|
Local government reorganisation; council established (37 seats)
| 1973 | 13 | 6 | 16 | – | – | – | 2 | No overall control |
| 1976 | 16 | 2 | 17 | 0 | – | – | 2 | No overall control |
New ward boundaries (39 seats)
| 1979 | 20 | 0 | 17 | 0 | – | – | 2 | Conservative |
| 1980 | 16 | 1 | 20 | 0 | – | – | 2 | Liberal |
| 1982 | 15 | 1 | 21 | 0 | – | – | 2 | Alliance |
| 1983 | 17 | 1 | 19 | 0 | – | – | 2 | No overall control |
| 1984 | 19 | 0 | 18 | 0 | – | – | 2 | No overall control |
| 1986 | 15 | 0 | 22 | 0 | – | – | 2 | Alliance |
| 1987 | 15 | 0 | 22 | 0 | – | – | 2 | Alliance |
| 1988 | 15 | 0 | 22 | 0 | – | – | 2 | SLD |
| 1990 | 14 | 1 | 22 | 0 | – | – | 2 | Liberal Democrats |
| 1991 | 14 | 1 | 22 | 0 | – | – | 2 | Liberal Democrats |
| 1992 | 14 | 1 | 22 | 0 | – | – | 2 | Liberal Democrats |
| 1994 | 11 | 1 | 25 | 0 | – | 0 | 2 | Liberal Democrats |
| 1995 | 5 | 3 | 29 | 0 | – | 0 | 2 | Liberal Democrats |
| 1996 | 2 | 6 | 29 | 0 | – | 0 | 2 | Liberal Democrats |
| 1998 | 5 | 10 | 22 | 0 | – | 0 | 2 | Liberal Democrats |
| 1999 | 8 | 15 | 13 | 0 | – | 0 | 3 (Note: Including 1 vacant seat) | No overall control |
| 2000 | 15 | 13 | 9 | 0 | – | 0 | 2 | No overall control |
| 2002 | 23 | 11 | 1 | 0 | – | – | 4 | Conservative |
| 2003 | 27 | 8 | 0 | 0 | – | 0 | 4 | Conservative |
New ward boundaries (39 seats) (Note: Changed from one-third to half council elections)
| 2004 | 24 | 2 | 1 | 0 | – | 0 | 2 | Conservative |
| 2006 | 26 | 0 | 1 | 0 | – | 0 | 2 | Conservative |
| 2008 | 26 | 0 | 1 | 0 | – | 0 | 2 | Conservative |
| 2010 | 25 | 0 | 2 | 0 | – | 0 | 2 | Conservative |
| 2012 | 25 | 1 | 1 | 0 | – | 0 | 2 | Conservative |
| 2014 | 20 | 1 | 0 | 0 | – | 5 | 3 | Conservative |
| 2016 | 16 | 3 | 0 | 0 | – | 8 | 2 | Conservative |
| 2018 | 16 | 7 | 0 | 0 | – | 3 | 2 | Conservative |
| 2021 | 19 | 7 | 0 | 1 | 0 | 0 | 2 | Conservative |
| 2022 | 16 | 9 | 0 | 2 | 0 | 0 | 2 | Conservative |
| 2024 | 8 | 17 | 0 | 2 | 0 | 0 | 2 | Labour |
| 2026 | 0 | 17 | 0 | 2 | 6 | 0 | 4 | |

== District result maps ==
2004 results map

2006 results map

2008 results map

2010 results map

2012 results map

2014 results map

2016 results map

2018 results map

2021 results map

2022 results map

2024 results map

2026 results map

== By-election results ==
=== 1994-1998 ===
Cokeham By-Election 1 May 1997
| Party | Candidate | Votes | % | ±% |
|---|---|---|---|---|
| Liberal Democrats | | 967 | 37.5 | −2.4 |
| Labour | | 821 | 31.8 | −14.9 |
| Conservative | | 790 | 30.6 | +17.2 |
| Majority | | 146 | 5.7 | |
| Turnout | | 2,578 | | |
| Liberal Democrats hold | | Swing | | |

Southwick Green By-Election 1 May 1997
| Party | Candidate | Votes | % | ±% |
|---|---|---|---|---|
| Liberal Democrats | | 1,066 | 38.3 | −20.5 |
| Conservative | | 1,062 | 38.2 | +15.5 |
| Labour | | 652 | 23.5 | +4.9 |
| Majority | | 4 | 0.1 | |
| Turnout | | 2,780 | | |
| Liberal Democrats hold | | Swing | | |

Widewater By-Election 1 May 1997
| Party | Candidate | Votes | % | ±% |
|---|---|---|---|---|
| Conservative | | 1,192 | 39.3 | +7.6 |
| Liberal Democrats | | 924 | 30.5 | −7.2 |
| Labour | | 916 | 30.2 | −0.4 |
| Majority | | 268 | 8.8 | |
| Turnout | | 3,032 | | |
| Conservative gain from Liberal Democrats | | Swing | | |

=== 1998-2002 ===
Peverel By-Election 2 July 1998
| Party | Candidate | Votes | % | ±% |
|---|---|---|---|---|
| Conservative | | 425 | 35.6 | −4.5 |
| Liberal Democrats | | 423 | 35.4 | −10.1 |
| Labour | | 346 | 29.0 | +14.7 |
| Majority | | 2 | 0.2 | |
| Turnout | | 1,194 | | |
| Conservative gain from Liberal Democrats | | Swing | | |

Widewater By-Election 24 June 1999
| Party | Candidate | Votes | % | ±% |
|---|---|---|---|---|
| Conservative | | 738 | 50.3 | +10.4 |
| Labour | | 589 | 40.2 | −4.7 |
| Liberal Democrats | | 139 | 9.5 | −5.7 |
| Majority | | 149 | 10.1 | |
| Turnout | | 1,466 | 34.6 | |
| Conservative gain from Labour | | Swing | | |

Manor By-Election 7 June 2001
| Party | Candidate | Votes | % | ±% |
|---|---|---|---|---|
| Conservative | Angela Mills | 886 | 41.9 | +3.1 |
| Liberal Democrats | Shirely Rance | 802 | 38.0 | −10.9 |
| Labour | Ronald Horne | 425 | 21.1 | −7.8 |
| Majority | | 84 | 3.9 | |
| Turnout | | 2,113 | 64.0 | |
| Conservative gain from Liberal Democrats | | Swing | | |

Peverel By-Election 7 June 2001
| Party | Candidate | Votes | % | ±% |
|---|---|---|---|---|
| Conservative | Andrew McGregor | 761 | 40.0 | −1.5 |
| Liberal Democrats | Barrie Marler | 617 | 32.4 | +2.7 |
| Labour | Jeanette White | 525 | 27.6 | −1.2 |
| Majority | | 144 | 7.6 | |
| Turnout | | 1,903 | 60.7 | |
| Conservative gain from Liberal Democrats | | Swing | | |

Southwick Green By-Election 7 June 2001
| Party | Candidate | Votes | % | ±% |
|---|---|---|---|---|
| Conservative | Iris Hayward | 895 | 38.9 | −0.6 |
| Liberal Democrats | Anthony Stuart | 720 | 31.3 | −1.3 |
| Labour | Teana Ashley | 686 | 29.8 | +2.0 |
| Majority | | 175 | 7.6 | |
| Turnout | | 2,301 | 61.1 | |
| Conservative gain from Labour | | Swing | | |

=== 2002-2006 ===
Churchill By-Election 20 February 2003
| Party | Candidate | Votes | % | ±% |
|---|---|---|---|---|
| Conservative | Sara Hall | 368 | 50.5 | −5.9 |
| Liberal Democrats | Roy Gibson | 213 | 29.2 | +29.2 |
| Labour | Ann Bridges | 148 | 20.3 | −12.4 |
| Majority | | 155 | 21.3 | |
| Turnout | | 729 | 18.8 | |
| Conservative hold | | Swing | | |

Marine By-Election 5 May 2005
| Party | Candidate | Votes | % | ±% |
|---|---|---|---|---|
| Independent | Keith Fayers-Morrisey | 1,190 | 62.3 | |
| Liberal Democrats | Doris Martin | 404 | 21.2 | |
| Labour | Daniel Yates | 316 | 16.5 | |
| Majority | | 786 | 41.1 | |
| Turnout | | 1,910 | 64.0 | |
| Independent hold | | Swing | | |

=== 2006-2010 ===
Hillside By-Election 14 September 2006
| Party | Candidate | Votes | % | ±% |
|---|---|---|---|---|
| Conservative | Angus Dunn | 445 | 59.1 | −0.2 |
| Liberal Democrats | Clive Connor | 184 | 24.4 | +2.7 |
| Labour | Barry Thompson | 124 | 16.5 | −2.5 |
| Majority | | 261 | 34.7 | |
| Turnout | | 753 | 22.0 | |
| Conservative hold | | Swing | | |

=== 2010-2014 ===
Cokeham By-Election, 18 October 2011
| Party | Candidate | Votes | % | ±% |
|---|---|---|---|---|
| Conservative | Nicholas Pigott | 288 | 39.6 | −15.6 |
| Labour | Barry Mear | 282 | 38.8 | +13.6 |
| UKIP | David Bamber | 91 | 12.5 | +12.5 |
| Green | Jennie Tindall | 35 | 4.8 | +4.8 |
| Liberal Democrats | Cyril Cannings | 31 | 4.3 | −15.3 |
| Majority | | 6 | 0.8 | −29.2 |
| Turnout | | 730 | 21.4 | −9.6 |
| Conservative hold | | Swing | -14.6 | |

Southlands By-Election, 2 May 2013
| Party | Candidate | Votes | % | ±% |
|---|---|---|---|---|
| UKIP | Paul Graysmark | 354 | 39.9 | +24.8 |
| Labour | Andy Bray | 254 | 28.6 | −8.5 |
| Conservative | Vicky Parkin | 228 | 25.7 | −12.3 |
| Liberal Democrats | Cyril Cannings | 51 | 5.7 | −4.1 |
| Majority | | 100 | 11.3 | |
| Turnout | | 887 | | |
| UKIP gain from Conservative | | Swing | | |

Paul Graysmark was elected in 2012 for the Conservatives; he resigned to seek re-election as a UKIP candidate.

=== 2014-2018 ===
St Mary's By-Election, 5 December 2014
| Party | Candidate | Votes | % | ±% |
|---|---|---|---|---|
| Conservative | Stephen Chipp | 340 | 38.4 | +1.3 |
| Labour | Irene Reed | 223 | 25.2 | +2.6 |
| UKIP | Jenny Greig | 216 | 24.4 | +3.3 |
| Green | Jennie Tindall | 106 | 12.0 | −0.7 |
| Majority | | 117 | 13.2 | |
| Turnout | | 885 | | |
| Conservative hold | | Swing | | |

Mash Barn By-Election, 5 October 2017
| Party | Candidate | Votes | % | ±% |
|---|---|---|---|---|
| Labour | Lee Cowen | 490 | 49.3 | +29.7 |
| Conservative | Jack Howard | 384 | 38.6 | +16.0 |
| Liberal Democrats | Doris Martin | 89 | 9.0 | −6.5 |
| Green | Paul Hendy | 31 | 3.1 | +3.1 |
| Majority | | 106 | 10.7 | |
| Turnout | | 994 | | |
| Labour gain from UKIP | | Swing | | |

=== 2018-2022 ===
Southlands By-Election, 11 October 2018
| Party | Candidate | Votes | % | ±% |
|---|---|---|---|---|
| Labour | Debs Stainforth | 448 | 45.9 | +4.1 |
| Green | Andrew Bradbury | 395 | 40.5 | +34.9 |
| Conservative | Tony Nicklen | 132 | 13.5 | −27.2 |
| Majority | | 53 | 5.4 | |
| Turnout | | 975 | | |
| Labour gain from UKIP | | Swing | | |

Hillside By-Election, 2 December 2021
| Party | Candidate | Votes | % | ±% |
|---|---|---|---|---|
| Conservative | Leila Williams | 414 | 56.2 | |
| Green | Russell Whiting | 175 | 23.7 | |
| Labour | Rebecca Allinson | 148 | 20.1 | |
| Majority | | 239 | 32.4 | |
| Turnout | | 737 | | |
| Conservative hold | | Swing | | |

=== 2022-2026 ===
Buckingham By-Election, 19 June 2025
| Party | Candidate | Votes | % | ±% |
|---|---|---|---|---|
| Labour | Kate Davis | 609 | 43.6 | −7.3 |
| Reform | Mike Mendoza | 311 | 22.3 | +22.3 |
| Conservative | Leila Williams | 301 | 21.6 | −10.1 |
| Liberal Democrats | Ian Jones | 153 | 11.0 | −1.3 |
| Britain First | David Bamber | 22 | 1.6 | +1.6 |
| Majority | | 298 | 21.3 | |
| Turnout | | 1,396 | | |
| Labour hold | | Swing | | |
