= 2022 Adur District Council election =

2022 UK local government election

- 5 May 2022

14 out of 29 seats to Adur District Council 15 seats needed for a majority

	First party	Second party
Party	Conservative	Labour
Last election	19 seats, 44.9%	7 seats, 31.1%
Seats won	7	5
Seats after	16	9
Seat change	▼3	▲2
Popular vote	6,881	7,011
Percentage	38.7%	39.4%
Swing	▼6.2%	▲8.3%
	Third party	Fourth party
Party	Green	Independent
Last election	1 seat, 12.8%	2 seats, 4.9%
Seats won	1	1
Seats after	2	2
Seat change	▲1	Steady
Popular vote	2,517	742
Percentage	14.1%	4.2%
Swing	▲1.3%	▼0.7%
- Winner of each seat at the 2022 Adur District Council election
Council control before election
Conservative
Council control after election
Conservative

The 2022 Adur District Council election took place on 5 May 2022 to elect members of Adur District Council. This was on the same day as other local elections. 14 of the 29 seats were up for election.

== Background ==
Adur District Council was created in 1974, and it was first controlled by the Conservatives from 1979 to 1980. The Liberal Party took control of the council, and held it from 1980 to 1999 (Liberal Democrats from 1988). The council then fell under no overall control, until the Conservatives regained control in 2002 (the Liberal Democrats lost representation on the council in 2014). In 2021 election, the Conservatives gained 2 seats with 44.9%, Labour made no gains or losses with 31.1%, the Green Party gained their first council seat with 12.8%, and UKIP lost their 3 seats on the council with 0.4%.

The seats up for election in 2022 year were last elected in 2018. In that election, the Conservatives made no net gains or losses with 44.0%, Labour gained 4 seats with 34.4%, and UKIP lost their 4 seats up for election with 5.3%.

== Previous council composition ==
After 2021 election		Before 2022 election	
Party	Seats	Party	Seats
Conservative	19	Conservative	19
Labour	7	Labour	7
Independent	2	Independent	2
Green	1	Green	1

Changes:

- September 2021: David Simmons (Conservative) dies; by-election held December 2021
- December 2021: Leila Williams wins by-election for Conservatives

== Results ==
2022 Adur District Council election
Party	This election				Full council			This election		
Party	Candidates	Seats	Net	Seats %	Other	Total	Total %	Votes	Votes %	+/−
Conservative	{{{candidates}}}	7	▼3	50.0	9	16	55.2	6,881	38.7	-6.2
Labour	{{{candidates}}}	5	▲2	35.7	4	9	31.0	7,011	39.4	+8.3
Green	{{{candidates}}}	1	▲1	7.1	1	2	6.9	2,517	14.1	+1.3
Independent	{{{candidates}}}	1	Steady	7.1	1	2	6.9	742	4.2	-0.7
Liberal Democrats	{{{candidates}}}	0	Steady	0.0	0	0	0.0	637	3.6	-2.4

== Results by ward ==
An asterisk indicates an incumbent councillor.

=== Buckingham ===
Buckingham
Party	Candidate	Votes	%	±%
Conservative	Emma Evans*	520	41.6	−8.1
Labour	Joseph O'Halloran	442	35.4	+7.4
Liberal Democrats	Nico Kearns	288	23.0	+12.2
Majority		78	6.2	
Turnout		1,250	41.0	
Conservative hold		Swing	▼7.8	

=== Churchill ===
Churchill
Party	Candidate	Votes	%	±%
Conservative	Steve Neocleous*	601	51.9	+2.2
Labour	Sylvia Knight	423	36.5	+12.1
Green	Helen Mears	134	11.6	−1.4
Majority		178	15.4	
Turnout		1,158	34.0	
Conservative hold		Swing	▼5.0	

=== Cokeham ===
Cokeham
Party	Candidate	Votes	%	±%
Conservative	Tony Bellasis	568	52.9	−8.0
Labour	Richard Aulton	369	34.4	+7.4
Green	Lynn Finnigan	136	12.7	+0.6
Majority		199	18.5	
Turnout		1,073	31.0	
Conservative hold		Swing	▼7.7	

=== Eastbrook ===
Eastbrook
Party	Candidate	Votes	%	±%
Labour	Carol O'Neal*	752	62.9	+23.8
Conservative	Jill Lennon	444	37.1	−9.5
Majority		308	25.8	
Turnout		1,196	36.0	
Labour hold		Swing	▲16.7	

=== Hillside ===
Hillside
Party	Candidate	Votes	%	±%
Conservative	Neil Parkin	559	50.5	−11.7
Labour	Rebecca Allinson	547	49.5	+19.6
Majority		12	1.0	
Turnout		1,106	33.0	
Conservative hold		Swing	▼15.7	

=== Manor ===
Manor
Party	Candidate	Votes	%	±%
Conservative	Carol Albury*	629	54.0	−4.6
Labour	Nigel Sweet	382	32.8	+13.2
Green	Maggie Rumble	153	13.1	+1.4
Majority		247	21.2	
Turnout		1,164	36.0	
Conservative hold		Swing	▼8.9	

=== Marine ===
Marine
Party	Candidate	Votes	%	±%
Independent	Julia Watts	742	51.9	−16.7
Green	Victoria Benson	347	34.3	+10.4
Labour	Pam Alden	341	23.8	+6.3
Majority		395	17.6	
Turnout		1,430	41.0	
Independent hold		Swing	▼13.6	

=== Mash Barn ===
Mash Barn
Party	Candidate	Votes	%	±%
Labour	Lee Cowen*	650	59.6	+17.5
Conservative	Doris Martin	320	29.4	−10.5
Liberal Democrats	Mike Mendoza	69	6.3	−5.7
Green	Carina Livingstone	51	4.7	−1.3
Majority		330	30.2	
Turnout		1,090	33.0	
Labour hold		Swing	▲14.0	

=== Peverel ===
Peverel
Party	Candidate	Votes	%	±%
Conservative	Paul Mansfield	524	51.7	−10.4
Labour	Stephen Garrard	399	39.3	+19.1
Green	Leslie Groves-Williams	91	9.0	−1.7
Majority		125	12.4	
Turnout		1,014	30.0	
Conservative hold		Swing	▼14.8	

=== Southlands ===
Southlands
Party	Candidate	Votes	%	±%
Labour	Dan Flower	523	45.5	+8.4
Conservative	Tania Edwards*	400	34.8	−1.5
Liberal Democrats	Ian Jones	153	13.3	−2.2
Green	Anne Younger	73	6.4	−4.6
Majority		123	10.7	
Turnout		1,149	37.0	
Labour gain from Conservative		Swing	▲5.0	

=== Southwick Green ===
Southwick Green
Party	Candidate	Votes	%	±%
Labour	Jude Harvey	667	47.6	+3.1
Conservative	Leila Williams	527	37.6	−2.8
Liberal Democrats	David Batchelor	127	9.1	−6.0
Green	Peter Riley	80	5.7	N/A
Majority		140	10.0	
Turnout		1,401	41.0	
Labour gain from Conservative		Swing	▲3.0	

=== St. Mary's ===
St. Mary's
Party	Candidate	Votes	%	±%
Labour	Catherine Arnold*	857	58.9	+11.3
Conservative	Brian Coomber	389	26.7	−6.2
Green	Jane Mott	209	14.4	+1.5
Majority		468	32.2	
Turnout		1,455	38.0	
Labour hold		Swing	▲8.8	

=== St. Nicolas ===
St. Nicolas
Party	Candidate	Votes	%	±%
Green	Julian Shinn	1,094	61.4	+14.6
Conservative	Bob Towner	687	38.6	+3.1
Majority		407	22.8	
Turnout		1,781	55.0	
Green gain from Conservative		Swing	▲5.8	

=== Widewater ===
Widewater
Party	Candidate	Votes	%	±%
Conservative	Andy McGregor*	713	46.9	−1.8
Labour Co-op	Adrienne Lowe	659	43.3	+17.9
Green	Patrick Ginnelly	149	9.8	−4.1
Majority		54	3.6	
Turnout		1,521	32.0	
Conservative hold		Swing	▼9.9	
