= 2004 Adur District Council election =

2004 UK local government election

Map of the results of the 2004 Adur council election. Conservatives in blue, Labour in red, Independents in grey and Liberal Democrats in yellow.

Elections to Adur District Council were held on 10 June 2004. The whole council was up for election with boundary changes since the last election in 2003 reducing the number of seats by 10. The Conservative Party held overall control of the council. Overall turnout was 38.0%.

== Results ==
Adur local election result 2004
Party	Seats	Gains	Losses	Net gain/loss	Seats %	Votes %	Votes	+/−
Conservative	24			-3	82.8	51.9	16,433	+5.1%
Labour	2			-6	6.9	20.4	6,456	-11.1%
Independent	2			-2	6.9	11.2	3,543	+7.2%
Liberal Democrats	1			+1	3.4	13.4	4,236	+2.2%
Green	0			0	0	2.2	686	-1.4%
UKIP	0			0	0	0.9	288	-2.0%

== Ward results ==
Buckingham (2)
Party	Candidate	Votes	%	±%
Conservative	Debra Kennard	872		
Conservative	Melanie Blunden	871		
Labour	Nigel Sweet	327		
Turnout		2,070		

Churchill (2)
Party	Candidate	Votes	%	±%
Conservative	Carol Bradburn	483		
Conservative	Graham Kerner	416		
Independent	Joy Hartley	342		
Liberal Democrats	Roy Gibson	317		
Independent	Denise Ferris	280		
Labour	Joyce Burns	223		
Turnout		2,061		

Cokeham (2)
Party	Candidate	Votes	%	±%
Conservative	Nicholas Pigott	488		
Labour	Kenneth Bashford	452		
Labour	Barry Mear	432		
Conservative	Vilna Woolhead	379		
Liberal Democrats	Tracey Clarke	310		
Turnout		2,061		

Eastbrook (2)
Party	Candidate	Votes	%	±%
Conservative	Carol Eade	572		
Conservative	James Funnell	544		
Labour	David Munnery	483		
Labour	Jean Woolgar	332		
Liberal Democrats	Jacqueline Painter	211		
Turnout		2,142		

Hillside (2)
Party	Candidate	Votes	%	±%
Conservative	Kenneth Eade	793		
Conservative	Janet Mockridge	657		
Liberal Democrats	Robert King	429		
Labour	Martin Horner	353		
Turnout		2,232		

Manor (2)
Party	Candidate	Votes	%	±%
Conservative	Keith Dollemore	586		
Conservative	Angela Mills	480		
Liberal Democrats	Stephen Martin	330		
UKIP	Lionel Parsons	288		
Liberal Democrats	Cathleen Davies	284		
Independent	Anthony Holmes	190		
Labour	Jean Turner	151		
Turnout		2,309		

Marine (2)
Party	Candidate	Votes	%	±%
Independent	Elizabeth McKinney	989		
Independent	Michael Mendoza	920		
Labour	Stephen Mear	167		
Turnout		2,076		

Mash Barn (2)
Party	Candidate	Votes	%	±%
Conservative	Brenda Collard	342		
Liberal Democrats	Ann Bridges	295		
Conservative	Maureen Condick	274		
Liberal Democrats	Richard Burt	264		
Independent	Patrick Beresford	200		
Independent	Sharon Wood	192		
Labour	Roy Banks	166		
Turnout		1,733		

Peverel (2)
Party	Candidate	Votes	%	±%
Conservative	Carson Albury	544		
Conservative	Brian Boggis	541		
Liberal Democrats	Timothy Clarke	470		
Labour	John Wales	312		
Turnout		1,867		

St. Mary's (2)
Party	Candidate	Votes	%	±%
Conservative	Michael Howard	560		
Conservative	Victoria Parkin	503		
Labour	Alan Heselden	454		
Labour	Sue-Ellen Murrell-Ashworth	434		
Turnout		1,951		

St. Nicolas (2)
Party	Candidate	Votes	%	±%
Conservative	Brian Coomber	851		
Conservative	Neil Parkin	666		
Green	Moyra Martin	425		
Labour	Daniel Yates	312		
Turnout		2,254		

Southlands (2)
Party	Candidate	Votes	%	±%
Conservative	Laura Graysmark	555		
Labour	Peter Berry	535		
Conservative	Paul Graysmark	517		
Labour	Andrew Bray	498		
Turnout		2,105		

Southwick Green (2)
Party	Candidate	Votes	%	±%
Conservative	Robert Dunn	727		
Conservative	Julie Searle	692		
Liberal Democrats	Anthony Stuart	308		
Green	Susan Board	261		
Labour	Steven Carden	224		
Labour	Julie Scarratt	218		
Turnout		2,430		

Widewater (3)
Party	Candidate	Votes	%	±%
Conservative	Wendy Gray	868		
Conservative	Anthony Nicklen	843		
Conservative	Christine Turner	799		
Liberal Democrats	Doris Martin	521		
Liberal Democrats	Yasoda Dooraree	497		
Independent	Elizabeth Edwards	430		
Labour	Adrienne Lowe	383		
Turnout		4,341		
