= Play Radio UK =

- United Kingdom

History
- Former frequencies: 107.2 FM in Southampton and 107.8 FM in Winchester (2009–2010)

Play Radio UK was a British internet radio station based on the South Coast of England. Its output comprised two mainstream music radio streams, a talk radio stream, and several other genre-specific music streams. From 2009 to 2010, Play Radio UK operated an FM service in Southampton and Winchester.

== History ==
The service was broadcast from a converted barn in Ford, a small village near Arundel, West Sussex. The building also hosted Dave Reynolds' other companies, including Satellite Direct and Something.info. The first three stations were launched in October 2006 with a mainstream music radio format. Later, further genre-specific music streams were added.

On 8 June 2009 Play Radio announced it had won the rights to the Southampton and Winchester FM licences on 107.2FM and 107.8FM. This service was launched on 4 July and carries a mixture of live local programming and live "networking" with their online stations. Play Radio UK went into liquidation at 10:00 a.m. on Friday 18 September 2009, although the Southampton services were operated under a separate company and (as of 1 October 2009) were not affected. The company was part directed by David Reynolds, who was charged with a £1.2 million tax fraud in June 2008, The FM stations were sold to Celador in 2010 and relaunched as The Breeze 107. The Play Radio brand and trademarks were sold on to Aiir.

== Stations ==
- Play One UK
- Play Two UK
- Play Talk UK
- Play Rock UK
- Play Classical UK
- Play Gold UK
- Play Love UK
- Play Dance UK
- Play Country UK
- Play Urban UK
- Play Top 40 UK
- Play Rock UK
- Play Jazz UK
- Play Reggae UK

== Play Talk UK ==
Tommy Boyd joined the station in 2007 with Play Radio's first talk-based show, a Sunday night phone-in programme. The station expanded its talk output in 2008, with the arrival of former Talksport presenters James Whale and Mike Mendoza .

At Easter 2008, Richard Hearsey began Hearsey's Half Hour, a two-hour programme. The title was suggested by comedian and actor Tim Vine. It was a chat and music show with special celebrity guests including Tim Vine, Chris Tarrant, Shaun Williamson, Alex Lowe, Bobby Davro, and Steve Nallon.

In March 2009, the station's talk output was moved from Play Two UK, to a new dedicated stream, Play Talk UK. Play Talk UK was the creation of Tommy Boyd, The intention was to create a 24/7 schedule of unregulated talk radio. In the process of expanding the hours of broadcast, new presenters were added to the Play Talk UK schedule.

In July 2009, Play Talk ceased broadcasting after its successful pilot test phase, due to lack of financial support. At the same time, the other online stations all became music-only services.

== Notable presenters ==
=== Play Radio UK ===
- Pat Sharp (later with Greatest Hits Radio)
- James Whale (deceased)

=== Play Talk UK ===
- Duncan Barkes
- Iain Dale (now at LBC)
- Iain Lee
- John Radford (deceased)
- Simon Darby
- Tommy Boyd (now at Regency Radio)
