= 2014 Adur District Council election =

2014 UK local government election

Election results (not including the second Mash Barn seat)

The 2014 Adur District Council elections took place on 22 May 2014 to elect members of Adur District Council in West Sussex, England. Half of the council was up for election.

== Results ==
Adur local election result 2014
Party	Seats	Gains	Losses	Net gain/loss	Seats %	Votes %	Votes	+/−
Conservative	9	0	4	-4	60.0	36.2	6648	
Labour	0	0	0	0	0.0	15.8	2900	
UKIP	5	5	0	+5	33.3	29.2	5352	
Liberal Democrats	0	0	1	-1	0	9.9	1819	
Shoreham Beach Residents' Association	1	0	0	0	6.7	4.0	743	
Green	0	0	0	0	0.0	4.8	886	

=== By ward ===
Buckingham
Party	Candidate	Votes	%	±%
Conservative	Emma Evans	678	53.5	
UKIP	Mick Clark	250	19.7	
Labour	Nicola Carden	171	13.5	
Green	Jennie Tindall	101	8.0	
Liberal Democrats	Thomas Hilditch	67	5.3	
Majority		428	33.8	
Turnout		1,267	40.5	
Conservative hold		Swing		

Churchill
Party	Candidate	Votes	%	±%
Conservative	James Butcher	631	47.5	
UKIP	Sid Hilsum	481	36.2	
Liberal Democrats	Steve Creed	217	16.3	
Majority		150	11.3	
Turnout		1,329	38.7	
Conservative hold		Swing		

Cokeham
Party	Candidate	Votes	%	±%
UKIP	Lyn Phillips	452	34.5	
Liberal Democrats	Kay Vincent	318	24.3	
Conservative	Tony Nicklen	317	24.2	
Labour	Alun Jones	223	17.0	
Majority		134	10.2	
Turnout		1,310	38.4	
UKIP gain from Conservative		Swing		

Eastbrook
Party	Candidate	Votes	%	±%
Conservative	James Funnell	428	34.7	
UKIP	Peter Hancock	325	26.3	
Labour	Sami Zeglam	262	21.2	
Liberal Democrats	David Eady	138	11.2	
Green	Patrick Ginnelly	81	6.6	
Majority		103	8.4	
Turnout		1,234	36.3	
Conservative hold		Swing		

Hillside
Party	Candidate	Votes	%	±%
Conservative	David Simmons	529	41.7	
UKIP	Jenny Greig	402	31.7	
Labour	Julie Scarratt	214	16.9	
Green	Stephen Barnes	65	5.1	
Liberal Democrats	Drew Tinsley	59	4.6	
Majority		127	10.0	
Turnout		1,269	37.4	
Conservative hold		Swing		

Manor
Party	Candidate	Votes	%	±%
Conservative	Carol Albury	590	44.5	
UKIP	Lionel Parsons	448	33.8	
Labour	Michael Thornton	168	12.7	
Liberal Democrats	Stuart Douche	120	9.0	
Majority		142	10.7	
Turnout		1,326	40.9	
Conservative hold		Swing		

Marine
Party	Candidate	Votes	%	±%
Shoreham Beach Residents Association	Ben Stride	743	56.2	
UKIP	Baz Pettett	248	18.8	
Labour	Joyce Burns	128	9.7	
Green	Sean Hawkey	128	9.7	
Liberal Democrats	Naira Baboumian	74	5.6	
Majority		495	37.4	
Turnout		1,321	36.7	
Shoreham Beach Residents Association hold		Swing		

Mash Barn (2)
Party	Candidate	Votes	%	±%
UKIP	David Lambourne	461	23.4	
UKIP	Liz Haywood	416	21.1	
Liberal Democrats	Doris Martin	265	13.5	
Conservative	Angie Mills	245	12.4	
Liberal Democrats	Steve Martin	224	11.4	
Conservative	John Hollington	198	10.1	
Labour	Douglas Bradley	159	8.1	
Turnout				
UKIP gain from Liberal Democrats		Swing		
UKIP gain from Conservative		Swing		

Peverel
Party	Candidate	Votes	%	±%
Conservative	Brian Boggis	469	39.1	
UKIP	Adrian Weber	420	35.0	
Labour	Kenneth Bashford	236	19.7	
Liberal Democrats	Raj Dooraree	75	6.3	
Majority		49	4.1	
Turnout		1,200	34.9	
Conservative hold		Swing		

Southlands
Party	Candidate	Votes	%	±%
UKIP	Ken Bishop	371	34.4	
Conservative	Stepphen Chipp	353	32.7	
Labour	Ian Lidbetter	250	23.2	
Liberal Democrats	Nilda Dooraree	55	5.1	
Green	Lousie Caroll	50	4.6	
Majority		18	1.7	
Turnout		1,079	36.6	
UKIP gain from Conservative		Swing		

Southwick Green
Party	Candidate	Votes	%	±%
Conservative	Emily Hilditch	588	45.2	
UKIP	Bill Jarman	271	20.8	
Labour	Steve Carden	244	18.8	
Green	Steven Huckle	109	8.4	
Liberal Democrats	Paul Taylor	88	6.8	
Majority		317	24.4	
Turnout		1,300	37.0	
Conservative hold		Swing		

St. Mary's
Party	Candidate	Votes	%	±%
Conservative	Mike Mendoza	508	37.1	
Labour	Irene Reed	309	22.6	
UKIP	Clive Burghard	289	21.1	
Green	Lynne Finnigan	174	12.7	
Liberal Democrats	Robert Burt	88	6.4	
Majority		199	14.5	
Turnout		1,368	36.5	
Conservative hold		Swing		

St. Nicholas
Party	Candidate	Votes	%	±%
Conservative	Neil Parkin	695	48.8	
UKIP	Mike Henn	228	16.0	
Labour	Peter Nelson	218	15.3	
Green	Moyra Martin	178	12.5	
Liberal Democrats	Jan Kimber	106	7.4	
Majority		467	32.7	
Turnout		1,425	45.3	
Conservative hold		Swing		

Widewater
Party	Candidate	Votes	%	±%
UKIP	Geoff Patmore	706	39.4	
Conservative	Mumin Elshahri	617	34.5	
Labour	David Devoy	318	17.8	
Liberal Democrats	Cyril Cannings	149	8.3	
Majority		89	4.9	
Turnout		1,790	38.1	
UKIP gain from Conservative		Swing		

Preceded by 2012 Adur District Council election	Adur District Council elections	Succeeded by Adur District Council election, 2016
