= 1990 Adur District Council election =

1990 UK local government election

← 1988	3 May 1990	1991 →

One third of seats (15 of 39) to Adur District Council 20 seats needed for a majority
	First party	Second party	Third party
Party	SLD	Conservative	Labour
Seats won	10	3	1
Seat change	Steady	▼1	▲1
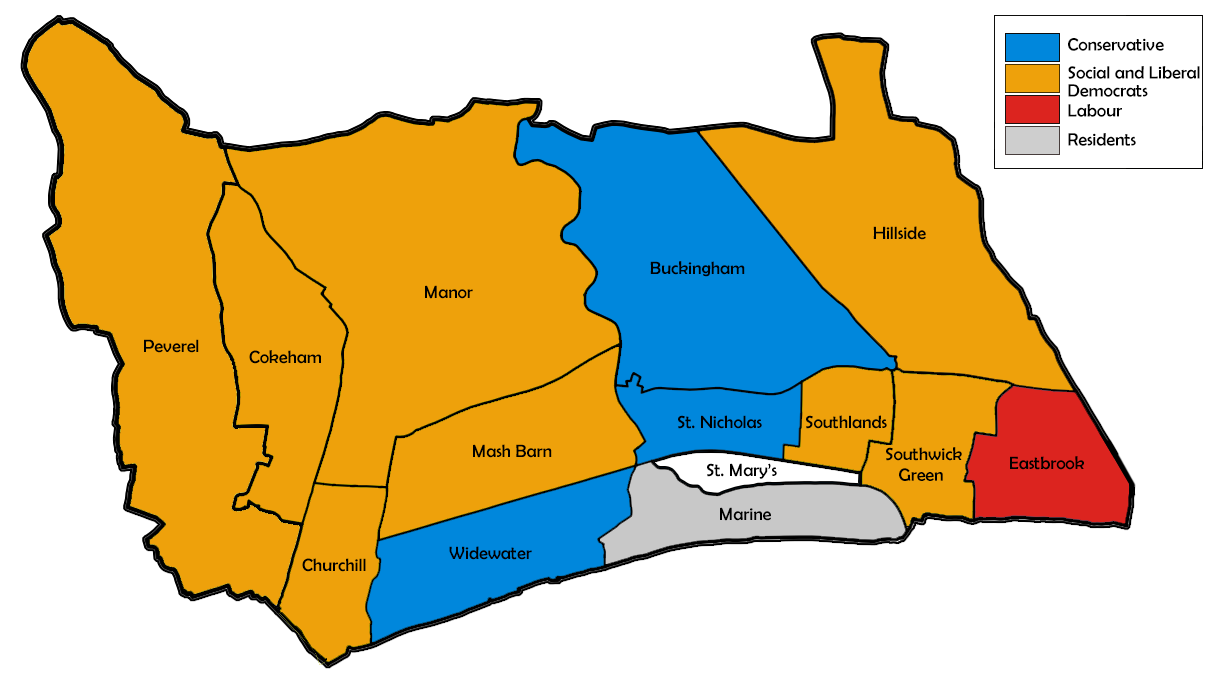
- Map showing the results of the 1990 Adur council elections.
Majority party before election
Social and Liberal Democrats
Majority party after election
Social and Liberal Democrats

Elections to the Adur District Council were held on 3 May 1990, with one third of the council up for election, as well as vacancies in the Churchill and Manor wards. No elections were held for the single-member St Mary's ward. Overall turnout jumped to 49.8%.

The election resulted in the Social and Liberal Democrats retaining control of the council.

== Election result ==
Adur District Council Election Result 1990
Party	Seats	Gains	Losses	Net gain/loss	Seats %	Votes %	Votes	+/−
SLD	10	1	1	0	66.7	38.1	8,767	-1.0
Conservative	3	0	1	-1	20.0	34.6	7,970	-12.7
Labour	1	1	0	+1	6.7	23.1	5,315	+13.6
Residents	1	0	0	0	6.7	3.0	683	-1.1
Green	0	0	0	0	0.0	1.3	295	+1.3

This resulted in the following composition of the council:

Party	Previous council	New council
Social and Liberal Democrats	22	22
Conservative	15	14
Independent Residents	2	2
Labour	0	1
Total	39	39
Working majority	5	5

== Ward results ==
Buckingham (3933)
Party	Candidate	Votes	%	±%
Conservative	Morris H. Ms.*	1,016	55.2	−14.5
SLD	Hammond G. Ms.	484	26.3	+3.7
Labour	Sweet G. Ms.	340	18.5	+10.8
Majority		532	28.9	−18.2
Turnout		1,840	46.8	+5.3
Conservative hold		Swing	-9.1	

Churchill (3740)
Party	Candidate	Votes	%	±%
SLD	Kelly V. Ms.	822	39.4	−15.0
SLD	Runnalls R.	751		
Conservative	Wood J.	655	31.4	−14.1
Conservative	Gray W. Ms.	641		
Labour	Vanags K.	312	15.0	+15.0
Green	Edwards D.	295	14.2	+14.2
Majority		167	8.0	−0.9
Turnout		2,084	46.5	+6.4
SLD hold		Swing		
SLD hold		Swing	-0.4	

Cokeham (3569)
Party	Candidate	Votes	%	±%
SLD	Ball C. Ms.	726	38.8	−4.1
Labour	Mear B.	676	36.1	+17.1
Conservative	Catchpole W.	470	25.1	−13.0
Majority		50	2.7	−2.0
Turnout		1,872	52.5	+14.2
SLD hold		Swing	-10.6	

Eastbrook (3526)
Party	Candidate	Votes	%	±%
Labour	Munnery D.	699	35.2	+13.2
SLD	Honore F.	692	34.9	+5.4
Conservative	Wiiliams S.	593	29.9	−18.6
Majority		7	0.4	−18.6
Turnout		1,984	56.3	+13.6
Labour gain from SLD		Swing	+3.9	

Hillside (3610)
Party	Candidate	Votes	%	±%
SLD	Stuart A.	754	37.9	−10.9
Conservative	Callar W.*	671	33.7	−17.5
Labour	Willson M.	564	28.4	+28.4
Majority		83	4.2	+1.7
Turnout		1,989	55.1	+9.3
SLD gain from Conservative		Swing	+3.3	

Manor (3361)
Party	Candidate	Votes	%	±%
SLD	Rance S. Ms.	790	47.7	+1.4
SLD	Runnalls B. Ms.	760		
Conservative	Boyce G.	588	35.5	−10.3
Conservative	Harris F.	525		
Labour	Morris C.	279	16.8	+8.9
Labour	Green M. Ms.	277		
Majority		202	12.2	+11.7
Turnout		1,657	47.9	+2.0
SLD hold		Swing		
SLD hold		Swing	+5.8	

Marine (2634)
Party	Candidate	Votes	%	±%
Independent	Hancock D.*	683	53.7	−3.8
Conservative	Patten E.	442	34.7	−2.2
Labour	Rose J.	148	11.6	+6.1
Majority		241	18.9	−18.0
Turnout		1,273	48.3	
Independent hold		Swing	-0.8	

Mash Barn (2811)
Party	Candidate	Votes	%	±%
SLD	King H.	671	49.9	−2.0
Labour	Atkins B.	344	25.6	+14.8
Conservative	Woodford D.	331	24.6	−12.8
Majority		327	24.3	+9.8
Turnout		1,346	47.9	+12.4
SLD hold		Swing	-8.4	

Peverel (3215)
Party	Candidate	Votes	%	±%
SLD	Vaughan E. Ms.	755	46.6	+4.6
Conservative	Swain L. Ms.	444	27.4	−13.6
Labour	Knott A. Ms.	421	26.0	+9.0
Majority		311	19.2	+18.2
Turnout		1,620	50.4	+15.3
SLD hold		Swing	+9.1	

Southlands (3305)
Party	Candidate	Votes	%	±%
SLD	Biggs S.	744	47.0	−3.8
Labour	Sweet N.	426	26.9	+11.2
Conservative	Lewis J. Ms.	412	26.0	−7.4
Majority		318	20.1	+2.8
Turnout		1,582	47.9	+6.1
SLD hold		Swing	-7.5	

Southwick Green (3850)
Party	Candidate	Votes	%	±%
SLD	Biggs A.*	995	54.4	−3.4
Conservative	Macpherson M.	595	32.5	−9.7
Labour	Willson S. Ms.	239	13.1	+13.1
Majority		400	21.9	+6.4
Turnout		1,829	47.5	+1.7
SLD hold		Swing	+3.1	

St. Nicolas (3673)
Party	Candidate	Votes	%	±%
Conservative	Huber J.*	885	47.5	−15.5
SLD	Pressley N.	550	29.5	+5.9
Labour	Whipp B.	429	23.0	+9.6
Majority		335	18.0	−21.3
Turnout		1,864	50.7	+7.8
Conservative hold		Swing	-10.7	

Widewater (4250)
Party	Candidate	Votes	%	±%
Conservative	Jones G.	868	41.5	−9.9
SLD	Isherwood D. Ms.	784	37.5	−1.7
Labour	Steadman G.	438	21.0	+11.5
Majority		84	4.0	−8.2
Turnout		2,090	49.2	+4.1
Conservative hold		Swing	-4.1	
