= 1983 Adur District Council election =

1983 UK local government election

← 1982	5 May 1983	1984 →

One third of seats (14 of 39) to Adur District Council 20 seats needed for a majority
	First party	Second party	Third party
Party	Conservative	Alliance	Labour
Seats won	7	7	0
Seat change	▲1	▼1	Steady
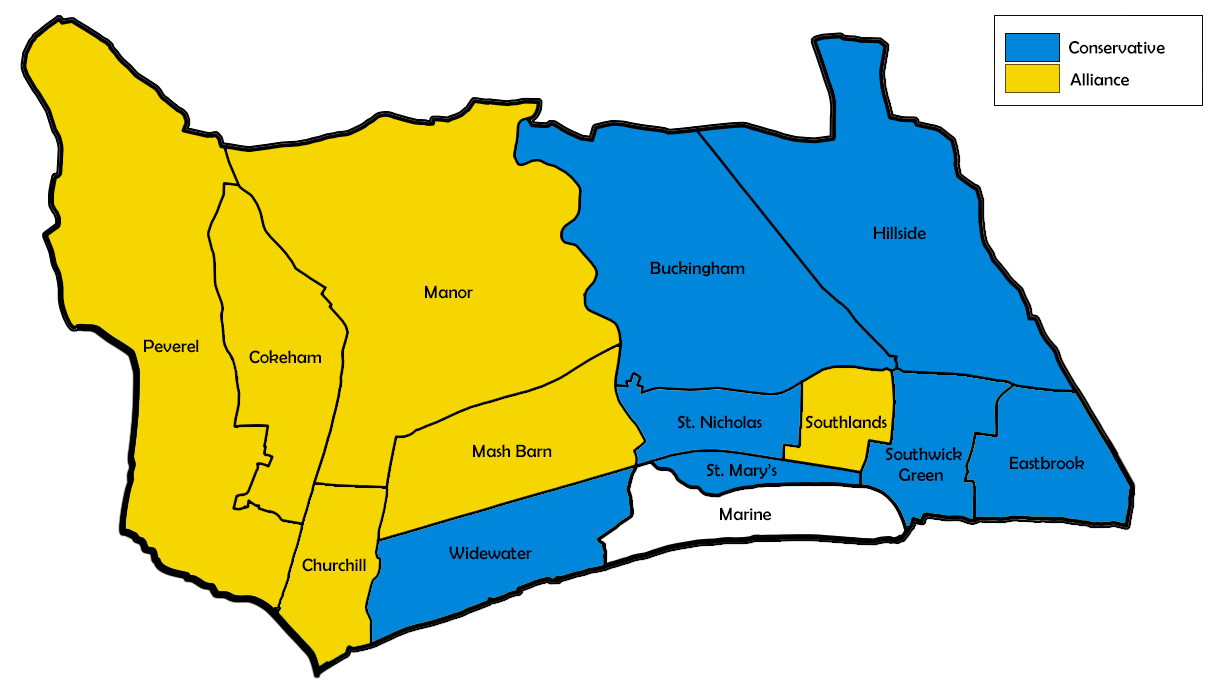
- Map showing the results of the 1983 Adur council elections.
Majority party before election
Alliance
Majority party after election
No Overall Control

Elections to the Adur District Council were held on 5 May 1983, with one third of the council up for election. There was an additional vacancy in the Peverel ward and no elections for the Marine ward. Overall turnout climbed to 47.6%.

The election resulted in the Alliance losing control of the council to no overall control.

== Election result ==
Adur District Council Election Result 1983
Party	Seats	Gains	Losses	Net gain/loss	Seats %	Votes %	Votes	+/−
Conservative	7	2	1	+1	50.0	47.6	10,115	+2.9
Alliance	7	1	2	-1	50.0	39.8	8,454	-3.4
Labour	0	0	0	0	0.0	12.2	2,583	0.0
Residents	0	0	0	0	0.0	0.4	92	+0.4

This resulted in the following composition of the council:

Party	Previous council	New council
SDP-Liberal Alliance	20	19
Conservative	16	17
Independent Residents	2	2
Labour	1	1
Total	39	39
Working majority	1	-1

== Ward results ==
+/- figures represent changes from the last time these wards were contested.

Buckingham (4049)
Party	Candidate	Votes	%	±%
Conservative	Merrick A.	1,311	67.1	+0.9
Alliance	Miller A.	643	32.9	−0.9
Majority		668	34.2	+1.8
Turnout		1,954	48.4	+4.8
Conservative hold		Swing	+0.9	

Churchill (3758)
Party	Candidate	Votes	%	±%
Alliance	Blunkett R.	815	46.0	+1.2
Conservative	Burley Y. Ms.	791	44.6	−1.1
Labour	Aldrich G.	167	9.4	−0.1
Majority		24	1.4	+0.5
Turnout		1,773	47.8	+8.2
Alliance gain from Conservative		Swing	+1.1	

Cokeham (3588)
Party	Candidate	Votes	%	±%
Alliance	Cheal J.	792	56.7	−29.5
Conservative	Hart E.	387	27.7	+27.7
Labour	Burns F.	219	15.7	+1.9
Majority		405	29.0	−43.4
Turnout		1,398	39.2	+10.8
Alliance hold		Swing	-28.6	

Eastbrook (3659)
Party	Candidate	Votes	%	±%
Conservative	Coghlan J.	998	51.1	+7.0
Labour	Barnard I.	955	48.9	+12.9
Majority		43	2.2	−5.9
Turnout		1,953	53.6	+4.3
Conservative hold		Swing	-2.9	

Hillside (3858)
Party	Candidate	Votes	%	±%
Conservative	Barber R.	1,017	60.6	+0.4
Labour	Woolgar J.	359	21.4	+3.2
Alliance	Watson W.	303	18.0	−3.6
Majority		658	39.2	+0.7
Turnout		1,679	43.7	+6.0
Conservative hold		Swing	-1.4	

Manor (3362)
Party	Candidate	Votes	%	±%
Alliance	Robinson C.	884	47.1	+5.0
Conservative	Wooven R.	876	46.7	−4.9
Labour	Aldrich S. Ms.	117	6.2	−0.1
Majority		8	0.4	−9.0
Turnout		1,877	53.5	+6.4
Alliance hold		Swing	+4.9	

Mash Barn (3011)
Party	Candidate	Votes	%	±%
Alliance	Hartly J.	701	55.2	−32.0
Conservative	Chad R.	416	32.8	+32.8
Labour	Grafton R.	153	12.0	−0.7
Majority		285	22.4	−52.1
Turnout		1,270	42.5	+15.5
Alliance hold		Swing	-32.4	

Peverel (3185)
Party	Candidate	Votes	%	±%
Alliance	Davis G.	808	51.1	−10.0
Alliance	Driscoll D.	681		
Conservative	Bailey R.	599	37.9	+6.5
Labour	Bridgson J.	175	11.1	+3.6
Majority		209	13.2	−16.5
Turnout		1,582	42.5	+5.3
Alliance hold		Swing		
Alliance hold		Swing	-8.2	

Southlands (3287)
Party	Candidate	Votes	%	±%
Alliance	Little S.	909	56.4	+3.9
Conservative	Bond A.	536	33.2	+0.6
Labour	Taylor M.	168	10.4	−4.4
Majority		373	23.2	+3.3
Turnout		1,613	48.5	+12.1
Alliance hold		Swing	+1.6	

Southwick Green (3670)
Party	Candidate	Votes	%	±%
Conservative	Woolgar R.	1,011	56.1	−0.6
Alliance	Pellett K.	791	43.9	+11.1
Majority		220	12.2	−11.7
Turnout		1,802	53.7	+11.8
Conservative gain from Alliance		Swing	-5.8	

St. Marys (973)
Party	Candidate	Votes	%	±%
Conservative	Warnham J.	208	43.2	N/A
Alliance	Biggs A.	92	19.1	N/A
Residents	Morris J. Ms.	92	19.1	N/A
Labour	Gibson C.	90	18.7	N/A
Majority		116	24.1	N/A
Turnout		482	48.7	N/A
Conservative hold		Swing	N/A	

St. Nicolas (3556)
Party	Candidate	Votes	%	±%
Conservative	Lucraft M.	1,102	56.3	−0.7
Alliance	Pressley N.	856	43.7	+8.3
Majority		246	12.6	−9.0
Turnout		1,958	50.9	+7.8
Conservative hold		Swing	-4.5	

Widewater (4143)
Party	Candidate	Votes	%	±%
Conservative	Floyd J.	863	45.3	−1.6
Alliance	Stanley A.	860	45.2	−0.8
Labour	Jacques W.	180	9.5	+2.3
Majority		3	0.1	−0.8
Turnout		1,903	46.5	+8.6
Conservative gain from Alliance		Swing	-0.4	
