= 1986 Adur District Council election =

1986 UK local government election

← 1984	8 May 1986	1987 →

One third of seats (13 of 39) to Adur District Council 20 seats needed for a majority
	First party	Second party	Third party
Party	Alliance	Conservative	Residents
Seats won	11	4	1
Seat change	▲4	▼4	Steady
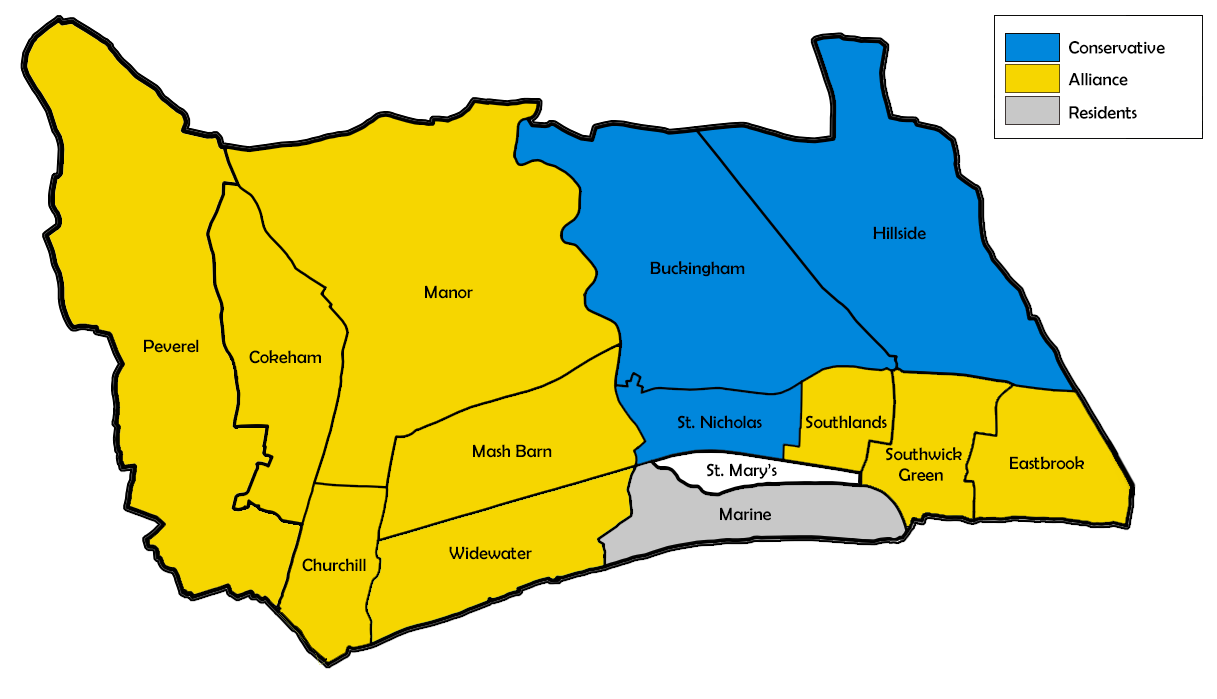
- Map showing the results of the 1986 Adur council elections.
Majority party before election
No Overall Control
Majority party after election
SDP-Liberal Alliance

Elections to the Adur District Council were held on 8 May 1986, with minor boundary changes taking effect, impacting the Peverel ward. One third of the council was due for re-election, with additional vacancies in Buckingham, Churchill and Mash Barn wards. No elections were to be held for the single-member St Mary's ward. The formerly Conservative councillor for Southwick Green was defending the seat as an Independent, with no Conservative contesting that ward. Overall turnout was down slightly to 45.3%.

The election resulted in the Alliance regaining control of the council.

== Election result ==
Adur District Council Election Result 1986
Party	Seats	Gains	Losses	Net gain/loss	Seats %	Votes %	Votes	+/−
Alliance	11	4	0	+4	68.8	42.8	8,951	+3.9
Conservative	4	0	3	-3	25.0	35.2	7,361	-9.1
Residents	1	0	0	0	6.3	3.4	717	-0.6
Labour	0	0	0	0	0.0	14.2	2,973	+1.5
Independent	0	0	1	-1	0.0	3.4	710	+3.4
Green	0	0	0	0	0.0	1.0	217	+1.0

This resulted in the following composition of the council:

Party	Previous council	New council
SDP-Liberal Alliance	18	22
Conservative	18	15
Independent Residents	2	2
Independent	1	0
Total	39	39
Working majority	-3	5

== Ward results ==
+/- figures represent changes from the last time these wards were contested.

Buckingham (3847)
Party	Candidate	Votes	%	±%
Conservative	Morris H. Ms.	952	57.3	−11.1
Conservative	Pelling C.	934		
Alliance	Miller A.	536	32.3	+0.7
Alliance	Connor C.	487		
Labour	Sweet G. Ms.	174	10.5	+10.5
Labour	Barnes S.	173		
Majority		416	25.0	−11.8
Turnout		1,662	43.2	+5.2
Conservative hold		Swing		
Conservative hold		Swing	-5.9	

Churchill (3750)
Party	Candidate	Votes	%	±%
Alliance	Sherwood J. Ms.	861	51.3	+4.0
Alliance	Mitchell C.	825		
Conservative	Gray W. Ms.	665	39.6	−3.6
Conservative	Kemp C.	663		
Labour	Aldrich S. Ms.	154	9.2	−0.4
Majority		196	11.7	+7.6
Turnout		1,680	44.8	−0.2
Alliance hold		Swing		
Alliance gain from Conservative		Swing	+3.8	

Cokeham (3584)
Party	Candidate	Votes	%	±%
Alliance	Brooks J.	743	55.3	−7.5
Conservative	Boggis B.	419	31.2	+4.5
Labour	Atkins B.	182	13.5	+3.0
Majority		324	24.1	−12.0
Turnout		1,344	37.5	−1.5
Alliance hold		Swing	-6.0	

Eastbrook (3681)
Party	Candidate	Votes	%	±%
Alliance	Tullett K.	767	39.8	+23.7
Conservative	Dunn R.	679	35.2	−10.9
Labour	Vinter C.	483	25.0	−12.8
Majority		88	4.6	−3.7
Turnout		1,929	52.4	+4.4
Alliance gain from Conservative		Swing	+17.3	

Hillside (3788)
Party	Candidate	Votes	%	±%
Conservative	Callar W.	748	41.8	−10.9
Labour	Langridge J.	690	38.6	+7.5
Alliance	Durrant J.	350	19.6	+3.4
Majority		58	3.2	−18.5
Turnout		1,788	47.2	+2.2
Conservative hold		Swing	-9.2	

Manor (3396)
Party	Candidate	Votes	%	±%
Alliance	Deedman D.	953	54.7	+3.2
Conservative	Lewis J.	663	38.1	−5.5
Labour	Boon C. Ms.	126	7.2	+2.3
Majority		290	16.6	+8.6
Turnout		1,742	51.3	−1.7
Alliance gain from Conservative		Swing	+4.3	

Marine (2633)
Party	Candidate	Votes	%	±%
Residents	Hancock D.	717	62.5	+1.2
Conservative	Lloyd M.	240	20.9	−7.0
Green	Martin M. Ms.	80	7.0	+7.0
Labour	Morris C.	61	5.3	+1.2
Alliance	Parsons E. Ms.	50	4.4	−2.4
Majority		477	41.6	+8.2
Turnout		1,148	43.6	−9.4
Residents hold		Swing	+4.1	

Mash Barn (3037)
Party	Candidate	Votes	%	±%
Alliance	Beresford P.	660	57.8	+1.0
Alliance	Robinson J. Ms.	635		
Conservative	Barnard D.	344	30.1	−2.3
Labour	Aldrich G.	138	12.1	+1.3
Majority		316	27.7	+3.3
Turnout		1,142	37.6	−0.4
Alliance hold		Swing		
Alliance hold		Swing	+1.6	

Peverel (3240)
Party	Candidate	Votes	%	±%
Alliance	Meeten J.	831	62.9	+4.8
Conservative	Wood J.	339	25.6	−7.1
Labour	Atkins H. Ms.	152	11.5	+2.3
Majority		492	37.2	+11.9
Turnout		1,322	40.8	−1.2
Alliance hold		Swing	+5.9	

Southlands (3398)
Party	Candidate	Votes	%	±%
Alliance	Edwards A.	873	51.1	+9.7
Conservative	Hermans G. Ms.	571	33.4	−9.5
Labour	Sweet N.	265	15.5	−0.1
Majority		302	17.7	+16.2
Turnout		1,709	50.3	+4.3
Alliance hold		Swing	+9.6	

Southwick Green (3821)
Party	Candidate	Votes	%	±%
Alliance	Biggs A.	864	49.9	+2.3
Independent	Ferrers-Guy B. Ms.	710	41.0	+41.0
Labour	Lansley J.	157	9.1	+3.0
Majority		154	8.9	+7.6
Turnout		1,731	45.3	−8.7
Alliance gain from Independent		Swing	-19.3	

St. Nicolas (3724)
Party	Candidate	Votes	%	±%
Conservative	Huber J.	867	49.0	−10.3
Alliance	Macfarlane D.	559	31.6	+5.6
Labour	Matthews K. Ms.	206	11.6	−3.0
Green	Hartland R.	137	7.7	+7.7
Majority		308	17.4	−16.0
Turnout		1,769	47.5	+0.5
Conservative hold		Swing	-7.9	

Widewater (4314)
Party	Candidate	Votes	%	±%
Alliance	Osborne S.	904	46.1	−2.7
Conservative	Hillier L. Ms.	874	44.5	+0.8
Labour	Pettiford K.	185	9.4	+1.9
Majority		30	1.5	−3.5
Turnout		1,963	45.5	−0.5
Alliance hold		Swing	-1.7	
