= 1984 Adur District Council election =

1984 UK local government election

← 1983	3 May 1984	1986 →

One third of seats (13 of 39) to Adur District Council 20 seats needed for a majority
	First party	Second party	Third party
Party	Alliance	Conservative	Residents
Seats won	7	5	1
Seat change	▼1	▲2	Steady
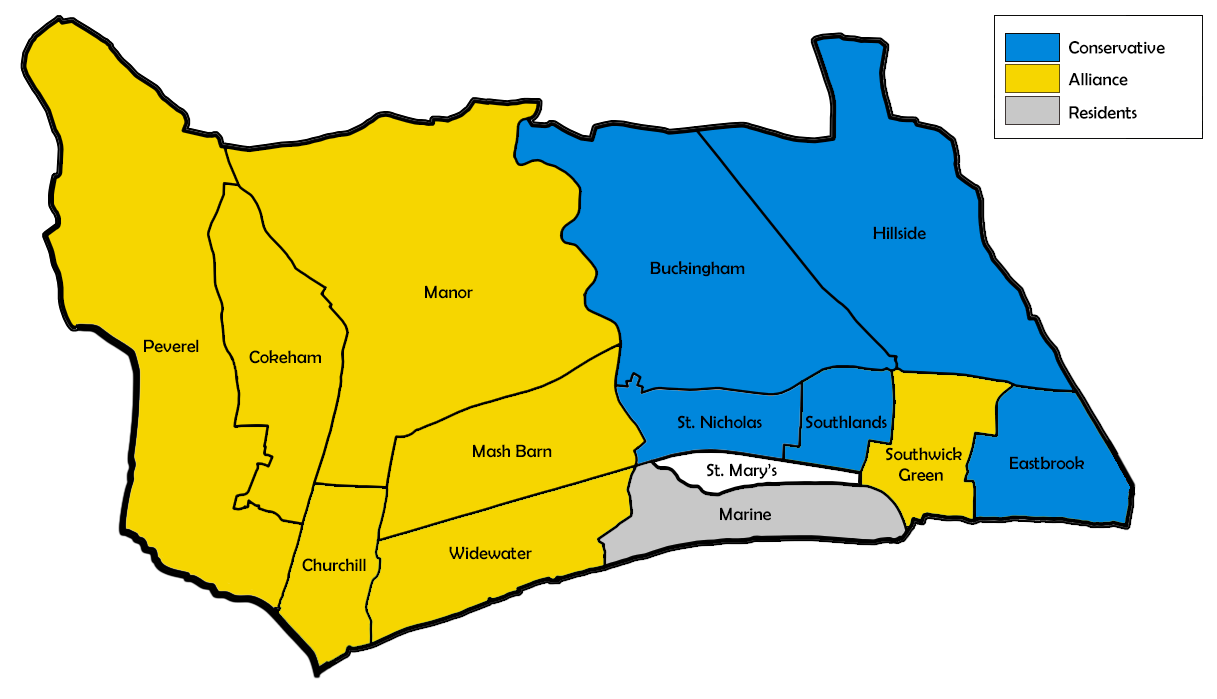
- Map showing the results of the 1984 Adur council elections.
Majority party before election
No Overall Control
Majority party after election
No Overall Control

Elections to the Adur District Council were held on 3 May 1984, with one third of the council up for election. There was no elections held for the single-member St Mary's ward. Overall turnout was recorded at 45.6%.

The election resulted in the council remaining under no overall control.

== Election result ==
Adur District Council Election Result 1984
Party	Seats	Gains	Losses	Net gain/loss	Seats %	Votes %	Votes	+/−
Alliance	7	0	1	-1	53.8	38.9	8,023	-0.9
Conservative	5	2	0	+2	38.5	44.3	9,158	-3.3
Residents	1	0	0	0	7.7	4.0	828	+3.6
Labour	0	0	1	-1	0.0	12.7	2,611	+0.5

This resulted in the following composition of the council:

Party	Previous council	New council
Conservative	17	19
SDP-Liberal Alliance	19	18
Independent Residents	2	2
Labour	1	0
Total	39	39
Working majority	-1	-1

== Ward results ==
+/- figures represent changes from the last time these wards were contested.

Buckingham (3997)
Party	Candidate	Votes	%	±%
Conservative	Smith M.	1,039	68.4	+1.3
Alliance	Miller A.	480	31.6	−1.3
Majority		559	36.8	+2.6
Turnout		1,519	38.0	−10.4
Conservative hold		Swing	+1.3	

Churchill (3767)
Party	Candidate	Votes	%	±%
Alliance	Trotman A. Ms.	801	47.3	+1.3
Conservative	Chad R.	732	43.2	−1.4
Labour	Aldrich G.	162	9.6	+0.1
Majority		69	4.1	+2.7
Turnout		1,695	45.0	−2.8
Alliance hold		Swing	+1.3	

Cokeham (3472)
Party	Candidate	Votes	%	±%
Alliance	Spalding M.	850	62.8	+6.1
Conservative	Boggis B.	361	26.7	−1.0
Labour	Burns F.	143	10.6	−5.1
Majority		489	36.1	+7.1
Turnout		1,354	39.0	−0.2
Alliance hold		Swing	+3.5	

Eastbrook (3563)
Party	Candidate	Votes	%	±%
Conservative	Woolgar A. Ms.	789	46.1	−5.0
Labour	Whipp B.	647	37.8	−11.1
Alliance	Tullett K.	274	16.0	+16.0
Majority		142	8.3	+6.1
Turnout		1,710	48.0	−5.6
Conservative gain from Labour		Swing	+3.0	

Hillside (3749)
Party	Candidate	Votes	%	±%
Conservative	Cary J.	890	52.8	−7.8
Labour	Slater J.	524	31.1	+9.7
Alliance	Pike R.	273	16.2	−1.9
Majority		366	21.7	−17.5
Turnout		1,687	45.0	+1.3
Conservative hold		Swing	-8.7	

Manor (3360)
Party	Candidate	Votes	%	±%
Alliance	Cooper M.	918	51.5	+4.4
Conservative	Woolven R.	776	43.6	−3.1
Labour	Aldrich S. Ms.	87	4.9	−1.3
Majority		142	8.0	+7.6
Turnout		1,781	53.0	−0.5
Alliance hold		Swing	+3.7	

Marine (2551)
Party	Candidate	Votes	%	±%
Residents	Shephard P.	828	61.2	N/A
Conservative	Duckley C.	377	27.9	N/A
Alliance	McNay A.	92	6.8	N/A
Labour	Deehan A.	55	4.1	N/A
Majority		451	33.4	N/A
Turnout		1,352	53.0	N/A
Residents hold		Swing	N/A	

Mash Barn (2974)
Party	Candidate	Votes	%	±%
Alliance	Moore M.	642	56.8	+1.6
Conservative	Jupp R.	366	32.4	−0.4
Labour	Grafton R.	122	10.8	−1.3
Majority		276	24.4	+2.0
Turnout		1,130	38.0	−4.5
Alliance hold		Swing	+1.0	

Peverel (3143)
Party	Candidate	Votes	%	±%
Alliance	Driscoll P. Ms.	766	58.0	+7.0
Conservative	Bailey R.	432	32.7	−5.1
Labour	Atkins H. Ms.	122	9.2	−1.8
Majority		334	25.3	+12.1
Turnout		1,320	42.0	−0.5
Alliance hold		Swing	+6.0	

Southlands (3280)
Party	Candidate	Votes	%	±%
Conservative	Thompson P.	648	42.9	+9.7
Alliance	Robinson J.	625	41.4	−14.9
Labour	Barnes S.	236	15.6	+5.2
Majority		23	1.5	−21.6
Turnout		1,509	46.0	−2.5
Conservative gain from Alliance		Swing	+12.3	

Southwick Green (3544)
Party	Candidate	Votes	%	±%
Alliance	King M.	911	47.6	+3.7
Conservative	Parish D. Ms.	886	46.3	−9.8
Labour	Woolgar J. Ms.	117	6.1	+6.1
Majority		25	1.3	−10.9
Turnout		1,914	54.0	+0.3
Alliance hold		Swing	+6.7	

St. Nicolas (3628)
Party	Candidate	Votes	%	±%
Conservative	Finch B.	1,012	59.4	+3.1
Alliance	Presley N.	443	26.0	−17.7
Labour	Matthews K. Ms.	250	14.7	+14.7
Majority		569	33.4	+20.8
Turnout		1,705	47.0	−3.9
Conservative hold		Swing	+10.4	

Widewater (4226)
Party	Candidate	Votes	%	±%
Alliance	Hammond D.	948	48.8	+3.6
Conservative	Pelling C.	850	43.7	−1.6
Labour	Jacques W.	146	7.5	−1.9
Majority		98	5.0	+4.8
Turnout		1,944	46.0	−0.5
Alliance hold		Swing	+2.6	
