= Mike Mendoza (broadcaster) =

British radio presenter and politician

Michael D Mendoza
- Born: 1 November 1948 (age 78)
- Occupation: Radio presenter
- Years active: until 2009
- Employer(s): LBC, Talksport, Press TV, Arise News
- Political party: Reform UK (2025-Present); Conservative (until 2004, 2009–2025; Independent (2004-2005); UKIP (2009)
- Spouse: Jennifer

Mike Mendoza (born 1 November 1948) is a British radio presenter and former politician best known for the overnight radio shows he presented on Talksport between 2004 and 2008, initially on weeknights before being moved to weekends in 2006. Mike joined Talksport after eleven years as overnight presenter with London's LBC. Mendoza was a Conservative councillor sitting on Adur District Council in West Sussex and was chairman of the council. He owned a magazine called What's Happening, which he later sold. In August 2014 Mendoza joined Latest TV, a local TV station in Brighton & Hove, presenting news, political debate and newspaper reviews. Mendoza was appointed chair of Lancing parish council in 2021.

In October 2016, Mike Mendoza joined news channel Arise News as a presenter/anchorman, whilst continuing to present current affairs shows and news reading two days per week on Latest TV.

Mendoza appeared in the Sinderfella alternative pantomime in Brighton in February 2016.

An illness in early 2017 prevented Mendoza working. He later returned to Arise News in June 2017 only to be taken ill yet again, this time with back ache problems.

In February 2018, Mike Mendoza joined an internet radio station called Delux Radio.

Mike Mendoza is made a full Director of Latest TV based in Brighton in September 2019.

== Radio career ==
Mendoza has worked around the world within the radio industry, getting his start at Radio I in Auckland, New Zealand. He has also worked briefly in Australia, the United States, the French Riviera, Italy and Monaco for an English language radio station. He returned to UK in his late 30s, and has worked for the BBC, Radio Mercury, Southern Sound, and LBC. Between radio work he spent time as a mini-cab driver. He joined Talksport in 2004, from which he parted company in 2008. Mendoza presented on internet station Play Radio UK, initially for eight hours a week; this was reduced to two hours a week until he left in 2009. He then joined talkradioOne, a Los Angeles-based internet radio station, presenting a three-hour weekly show. From September 2009 the LA show was also heard on Radio Glastonbury, a UK internet station. Mendoza joined internet radio station Delux Radio in February 2018 and presents the mid afternoon 2-4 pm show five days per week except weekends.

Mendoza is of Jewish heritage although an atheist. He co-founded a London-based Jewish radio station, Shalom FM, stating "We are one of the few ethnic groups in London without a radio voice, and it would be nice to hear some balanced reporting from my point of view about the community and Israel." Mendoza's former Talksport colleague Charlie Wolf presented a twice-weekly show on the station, which due to poor listening figures and lack of advertising revenue ceased broadcasting in October 2007,

== Political career ==
A former member of the Conservative Party, Mendoza was a councillor for the party on Hove Borough Council (now part of Brighton and Hove City Council) and nearby Adur District Council. Mendoza represented the Peverel ward for the Conservatives in the May 2002 elections. He resigned from the Conservative Party in 2004, and stood in the June 2004 elections for the Marine Ward on Adur District Council. He won the seat as an independent, a week before it was announced that he would be joining Talksport. He stood down as a councillor in May 2005. In the June 2009 local elections he was as a candidate for UKIP in the Saltings ward of West Sussex County Council. He re-joined the Conservative Party in December 2009 and was elected to Adur District Council in May 2010 as a councillor in St Mary's ward. In 2012 Mendoza became deputy chairman (deputy mayor) of Adur District Council and vice-chairman of planning. In May 2013 he was elected chairman of Adur District Council, but resigned as a councillor in October 2014. In May 2026 he was elected to Adur District Council as a Reform party candidate.

== Personal life ==
Mendoza is married to Jennifer, his third wife, and they live in Shoreham-by-Sea near Brighton. He has two children and four grandchildren. He is a relative of comedian and actor Peter Sellers, and descends from the same family as British boxing legend Daniel Mendoza. He also has a 'long and close friendship' with the New Zealand actor Alan Dale.
