= 1982 Adur District Council election =

1982 UK local government election

← 1980	6 May 1982	1983 →

One third of seats (15 of 39) to Adur District Council 20 seats needed for a majority
	First party	Second party	Third party
Party	Conservative	Alliance	Residents
Seats won	8	6	1
Seat change	▲2	▼2	Steady
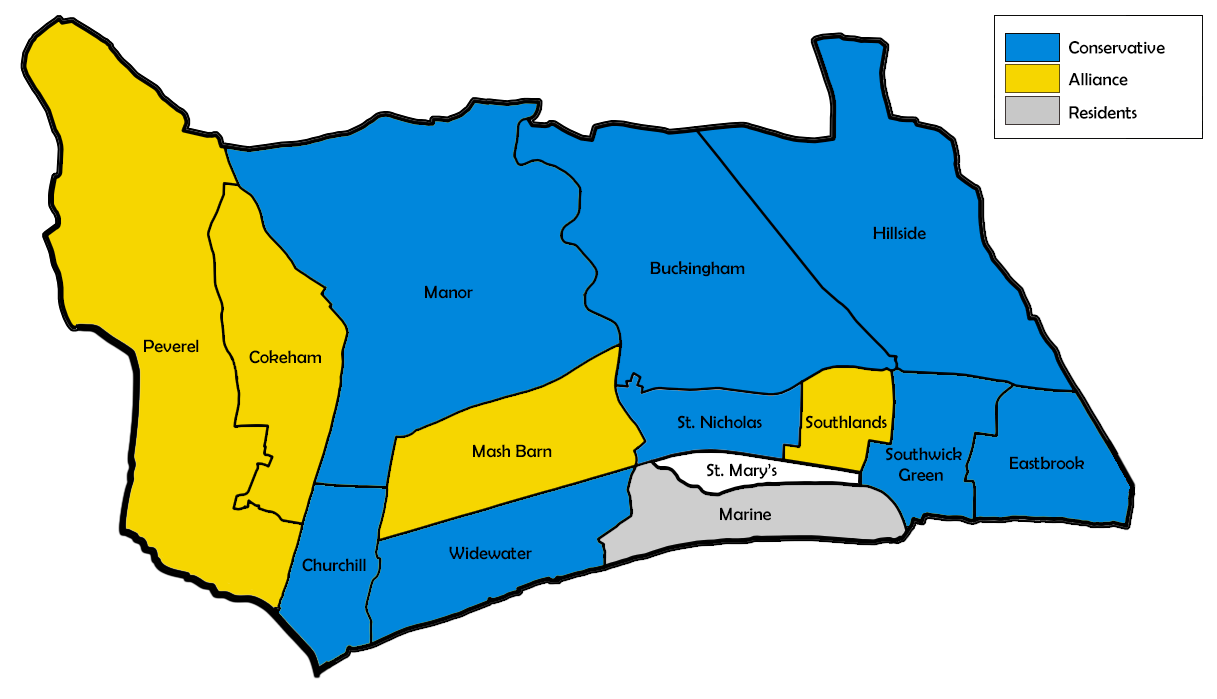
- Map showing the results of the 1982 Adur council elections.
Majority party before election
Alliance
Majority party after election
Alliance

Elections to the Adur District Council were held on 6 May 1982, with one third of the council up for election. There was additional vacancies in the Mash Barn and Peverel wards, but no elections for the single-member ward St Marys and Residents stronghold, Marine, which went uncontested. In the intervening years, the newly formed Alliance had gained three seats at the expense of the Conservatives. Overall turnout fell to 42.4%.

The election resulted in the SDP-Liberal Alliance retaining control of the council.

== Election result ==
Adur District Council Election Result 1982
Party	Seats	Gains	Losses	Net gain/loss	Seats %	Votes %	Votes	+/−
Conservative	8	2	0	+2	53.3	44.7	7,478	+7.4
Alliance	6	0	2	-2	40.0	43.2	7,221	-1.5
Residents	1	0	0	0	6.7	0.0	0	-4.0
Labour	0	0	0	0	0.0	12.2	2,033	-1.8

This resulted in the following composition of the council:

Party	Previous council	New council
SDP-Liberal Alliance	23	21
Conservative	13	15
Independent Residents	2	2
Labour	1	1
Total	39	39
Working majority	7	3

== Ward results ==
+/- figures represent changes from the last time these wards were contested.

Buckingham (4017)
Party	Candidate	Votes	%	±%
Conservative	Morris H. Ms.	1,160	66.2	+3.5
Alliance	Miller A.	592	33.8	+6.7
Majority		568	32.4	−3.2
Turnout		1,752	43.6	
Conservative hold		Swing	-1.6	

Churchill (3735)
Party	Candidate	Votes	%	±%
Conservative	Kemp C.	676	45.7	+9.2
Alliance	Blunkett R.	663	44.8	−9.7
Labour	Cosgrave L.	141	9.5	+0.5
Majority		13	0.9	−17.2
Turnout		1,480	39.6	−9.7
Conservative hold		Swing	+9.4	

Cokeham (3550)
Party	Candidate	Votes	%	±%
Alliance	Brooks J.	868	86.2	+27.2
Labour	Taylor M.	139	13.8	+5.8
Majority		729	72.4	+46.5
Turnout		1,007	28.4	−16.7
Alliance hold		Swing	+10.7	

Eastbrook (3635)
Party	Candidate	Votes	%	±%
Conservative	Dunn R.	791	44.1	+10.0
Labour	Barnard D.	645	36.0	−5.4
Alliance	Williams A. Ms.	357	19.9	−4.7
Majority		146	8.1	+0.9
Turnout		1,793	49.3	−0.1
Conservative hold		Swing	+7.7	

Hillside (3819)
Party	Candidate	Votes	%	±%
Conservative	Wey G.	865	60.2	+18.8
Alliance	James G.	311	21.6	−2.3
Labour	Backwell J. Ms.	262	18.2	−16.5
Majority		554	38.5	+31.8
Turnout		1,438	37.7	−6.7
Conservative hold		Swing	+10.5	

Manor (3284)
Party	Candidate	Votes	%	±%
Conservative	Lewis J.	797	51.6	+10.3
Alliance	Beales W.	651	42.1	−11.1
Labour	Aldrich G.	98	6.3	+0.8
Majority		146	9.4	−2.5
Turnout		1,546	47.1	−2.2
Conservative gain from Alliance		Swing	+10.7	

Marine (2617)
Party	Candidate	Votes	%	±%
Residents	Shephard P.	Unopposed	N/A	N/A
Residents hold		Swing	N/A	

Mash Barn (2963)
Party	Candidate	Votes	%	±%
Alliance	Beresford P.	697	87.2	+20.2
Alliance	Hartley J. Ms.	688		
Labour	Harwood R.	102	12.8	+4.7
Labour	Atkins H. Ms.	84		
Majority		595	74.5	+32.4
Turnout		799	27.0	−17.0
Alliance hold		Swing		
Alliance hold		Swing	+7.7	

Peverel (3167)
Party	Candidate	Votes	%	±%
Alliance	Meeten J.	720	61.1	+1.6
Alliance	Megginson J. Ms.	687		
Conservative	Titley T.	370	31.4	+2.0
Labour	Atkins B.	88	7.5	−3.6
Labour	Atkins H. Ms.	82		
Majority		350	29.7	−0.5
Turnout		1,178	37.2	−3.0
Alliance hold		Swing		
Alliance hold		Swing	-0.2	

Southlands (3294)
Party	Candidate	Votes	%	±%
Alliance	Edwards A.	629	52.5	−5.0
Conservative	Hart E.	391	32.6	+6.4
Labour	Matthews M. Ms.	178	14.9	−1.4
Majority		238	19.9	−11.3
Turnout		1,198	36.4	−6.4
Alliance hold		Swing	-5.7	

Southwick Green (3459)
Party	Candidate	Votes	%	±%
Conservative	Ferrers-Guy B. Ms.	821	56.7	+16.0
Alliance	Watson W.	475	32.8	−15.6
Labour	Edwards E. Ms.	153	10.6	−0.4
Majority		346	23.9	+16.1
Turnout		1,449	41.9	−8.4
Conservative gain from Alliance		Swing	+15.8	

St. Nicolas (3583)
Party	Candidate	Votes	%	±%
Conservative	Huber J.	881	57.0	+8.0
Alliance	Attrill D. Ms.	547	35.4	−7.3
Labour	Bridson J. Ms.	117	7.6	−0.7
Majority		334	21.6	+15.3
Turnout		1,545	43.1	−1.8
Conservative hold		Swing	+7.6	

Widewater (4085)
Party	Candidate	Votes	%	±%
Conservative	Moulton B.	726	46.9	+13.0
Alliance	Mantey B. Ms.	711	46.0	−14.2
Labour	Jacques W.	110	7.1	+1.2
Majority		15	1.0	−25.2
Turnout		1,547	37.9	−6.1
Conservative hold		Swing	+13.6	
