= 2012 Adur District Council election =

2012 UK local government election

Map of the results of the 2012 Adur council election. Conservatives in blue, Labour in red and Residents in white.

The 2012 Adur District Council elections took place on 3 May 2012 to elect members of Adur District Council in West Sussex, England. Half of the council was up for election, and the Conservative Party remained in overall control of the council.

After the election, the composition of the council was:

- Conservative 25 (no change)
- Shoreham Beach Residents Association 2 (no change)
- Labour 1 (+1)
- Liberal Democrats 1 (-1)

== Results ==
The election saw the Conservatives remain in overall control of the council after winning 13 of the 15 seats which were contested. They gained Eastbrook from the Liberal Democrats having lost it in a double vacancy at the 2010 elections, but this gain was offset by the loss of Cokeham to Labour, who thus gained their first representation on the council since 2006. In addition Labour saw their vote share rise by more than 12% across the district, whilst the UK Independence Party (UKIP) also saw their vote share increase. The Liberal Democrats were the main losers, seeing their vote fall by 14%, pushing their into fourth place, behind UKIP.

Adur local election result 2012
| Party | Seats | Gains | Losses | Net gain/loss | Seats % | Votes % | Votes | +/− |
|---|---|---|---|---|---|---|---|---|
| Conservative | 13 | 1 | 1 | 0 | 86.6 | 41.0 | 5,956 | -0.3 |
| Labour | 1 | 1 | 0 | +1 | 6.6 | 25.3 | 3,676 | +12.7 |
| UKIP | 0 | 0 | 0 | 0 | 0.0 | 17.5 | 2,535 | +6.3 |
| Liberal Democrats | 0 | 0 | 1 | -1 | 0.0 | 10.1 | 1,471 | -14.0 |
| Shoreham Beach Residents' Association | 1 | 0 | 0 | 0 | 6.6 | 4.1 | 594 | -0.7 |
| Green | 0 | 0 | 0 | 0 | 0.0 | 2.0 | 293 | -4.1 |

== Ward results ==
Buckingham
| Party | Candidate | Votes | % | ±% |
|---|---|---|---|---|
| Conservative | Debbie Kennard | 577 | 60.8 | +4.9 |
| Labour | Nicola Carden | 167 | 17.6 | N/A |
| UKIP | Mick Clark | 128 | 13.5 | +5.0 |
| Liberal Democrats | Julie Petrie | 77 | 8.1 | −27.5 |
| Majority | | 410 | 43.2 | +22.9 |
| Turnout | | 949 | 30.1 | −43.9 |
| Conservative hold | | Swing | -6.4 | |

Churchill
| Party | Candidate | Votes | % | ±% |
|---|---|---|---|---|
| Conservative | Pat Beresford | 326 | 36.1 | −6.5 |
| UKIP | David Bushell | 325 | 36.0 | +20.9 |
| Liberal Democrats | Steve Martin | 252 | 27.9 | −8.8 |
| Majority | | 1 | 0.1 | −5.8 |
| Turnout | | 903 | 25.9 | −34.1 |
| Conservative hold | | Swing | -13.7 | |

Cokeham
| Party | Candidate | Votes | % | ±% |
|---|---|---|---|---|
| Labour | Barry Mear | 393 | 39.7 | +19.3 |
| Conservative | Nicholas Pigott | 351 | 35.4 | −6.8 |
| UKIP | David Bamber | 189 | 19.1 | +8.8 |
| Liberal Democrats | Nilda Dooraree | 58 | 5.9 | −21.2 |
| Majority | | 42 | 4.3 | |
| Turnout | | 991 | 29.1 | −34.9 |
| Labour gain from Conservative | | Swing | +13.1 | |

Eastbrook
| Party | Candidate | Votes | % | ±% |
|---|---|---|---|---|
| Conservative | Dave Donaldson | 370 | 37.4 | |
| Labour | Alun Jones | 334 | 33.8 | |
| UKIP | Jenny Greig | 125 | 12.7 | |
| Green | Jennie Tindall | 88 | 8.9 | |
| Liberal Democrats | Tom Hilditch | 71 | 7.2 | |
| Majority | | 36 | 3.6 | |
| Turnout | | 988 | 29.0 | −34.0 |
| Conservative gain from Liberal Democrats | | Swing | | |

Hillside
| Party | Candidate | Votes | % | ±% |
|---|---|---|---|---|
| Conservative | Angus Dunn | 499 | 51.0 | +3.2 |
| Labour | Julie Scarratt | 268 | 27.4 | N/A |
| UKIP | Rupert Greig | 150 | 15.3 | +3.4 |
| Liberal Democrats | Paul Taylor | 61 | 6.2 | −25.4 |
| Majority | | 231 | 23.6 | +7.4 |
| Turnout | | 978 | 28.8 | −35.2 |
| Conservative hold | | Swing | -12.1 | |

Manor
| Party | Candidate | Votes | % | ±% |
|---|---|---|---|---|
| Conservative | Keith Dollemore | 391 | 40.9 | −8.0 |
| UKIP | Lionel Parsons | 326 | 34.1 | +16.9 |
| Labour | Michael Rubin | 147 | 15.4 | N/A |
| Liberal Democrats | Stuart Douch | 93 | 9.7 | −24.2 |
| Majority | | 65 | 6.8 | −8.2 |
| Turnout | | 957 | 30.0 | −38.0 |
| Conservative hold | | Swing | -12.5 | |

Marine
| Party | Candidate | Votes | % | ±% |
|---|---|---|---|---|
| Shoreham Beach Residents' Association | Liza McKinney | 594 | 67.0 | +13.2 |
| UKIP | Peter Harvey | 122 | 13.8 | 0.0 |
| Labour | Joyce Burns | 109 | 12.3 | +0.9 |
| Liberal Democrats | Naira Baboumian | 62 | 7.0 | N/A |
| Majority | | 472 | 53.2 | +20.3 |
| Turnout | | 887 | 25.0 | −45.0 |
| Shoreham Beach Residents Associations hold | | Swing | +6.6 | |

Mash Barn
| Party | Candidate | Votes | % | ±% |
|---|---|---|---|---|
| Conservative | Andrew Barnes | 269 | 34.3 | −6.2 |
| UKIP | Sid Hilsum | 190 | 24.2 | +6.6 |
| Labour | Douglas Bradley | 174 | 22.2 | N/A |
| Liberal Democrats | Doris Martin | 151 | 19.3 | −22.6 |
| Majority | | 79 | 10.1 | |
| Turnout | | 784 | 23.8 | −35.2 |
| Conservative hold | | Swing | -6.4 | |

Peverel
| Party | Candidate | Votes | % | ±% |
|---|---|---|---|---|
| Conservative | Carson Albury | 373 | 43.1 | −4.7 |
| Labour | Kenneth Bashford | 255 | 29.4 | +9.0 |
| UKIP | Reuben Whiting | 178 | 20.6 | +10.6 |
| Liberal Democrats | Raj Dooraree | 60 | 6.9 | −14.9 |
| Majority | | 118 | 13.7 | −12.3 |
| Turnout | | 866 | 25.0 | −39.0 |
| Conservative hold | | Swing | -6.9 | |

Southlands
| Party | Candidate | Votes | % | ±% |
|---|---|---|---|---|
| Conservative | Paul Graysmark | 329 | 38.0 | +0.3 |
| Labour | Richard Jones | 321 | 37.1 | +7.7 |
| UKIP | Frank Mills | 131 | 15.1 | +5.9 |
| Liberal Democrats | Cyril Cannings | 85 | 9.8 | −13.9 |
| Majority | | 8 | 0.9 | −7.4 |
| Turnout | | 866 | 28.9 | −34.1 |
| Conservative hold | | Swing | -3.7 | |

Southwick Green
| Party | Candidate | Votes | % | ±% |
|---|---|---|---|---|
| Conservative | Peter Metcalfe | 511 | 53.1 | +11.2 |
| Labour | Steve Carden | 238 | 24.7 | +9.3 |
| UKIP | Darryl Pledge | 123 | 12.8 | +7.4 |
| Liberal Democrats | David Edey | 91 | 9.4 | −12.7 |
| Majority | | 273 | 28.4 | +8.6 |
| Turnout | | 963 | 27.1 | −39.9 |
| Conservative hold | | Swing | +1.0 | |

St. Mary's
| Party | Candidate | Votes | % | ±% |
|---|---|---|---|---|
| Conservative | Rod Hotton | 335 | 35.6 | −6.0 |
| Labour | Irene Reed | 247 | 26.2 | −0.7 |
| Green | Lynn Finnigan | 205 | 21.8 | +2.3 |
| UKIP | Michael Henn | 103 | 10.9 | −1.1 |
| Liberal Democrats | John Hilditch | 51 | 5.4 | N/A |
| Majority | | 88 | 9.4 | −5.3 |
| Turnout | | 941 | 27.5 | −35.5 |
| Conservative hold | | Swing | -4.4 | |

St. Nicholas
| Party | Candidate | Votes | % | ±% |
|---|---|---|---|---|
| Conservative | Brian Coomber | 572 | 50.0 | +2.5 |
| Labour | Sami Zeglam | 270 | 23.6 | +9.1 |
| Liberal Democrats | Janet Kimber | 153 | 13.4 | −9.0 |
| UKIP | Clive Burghard | 149 | 13.0 | +7.4 |
| Majority | | 302 | 26.4 | +1.3 |
| Turnout | | 1,144 | 36.2 | −38.8 |
| Conservative hold | | Swing | -3.3 | |

Widewater (2)
| Party | Candidate | Votes | % | ±% |
|---|---|---|---|---|
| Conservative | Ann Bridges | 564 | | |
| Conservative | Fred Lewis | 489 | | |
| Labour | David Devoy | 390 | | |
| Labour | Michael Thornton | 363 | | |
| UKIP | George Osborne | 296 | | |
| Liberal Democrats | Kay Vincent | 206 | | |
| Turnout | | | 27.6 | −39.4 |
| Conservative hold | | Swing | | |
| Conservative hold | | Swing | | |

== Bibliography ==
- Adur District Council: Elections May 2012 Adur District Council
