= 1988 Adur District Council election =

1988 UK local government election

← 1987	5 May 1988	1990 →

One third of seats (13 of 39) to Adur District Council 20 seats needed for a majority
	First party	Second party	Third party
Party	SLD	Conservative	Residents
Seats won	7	5	1
Seat change	Steady	Steady	Steady
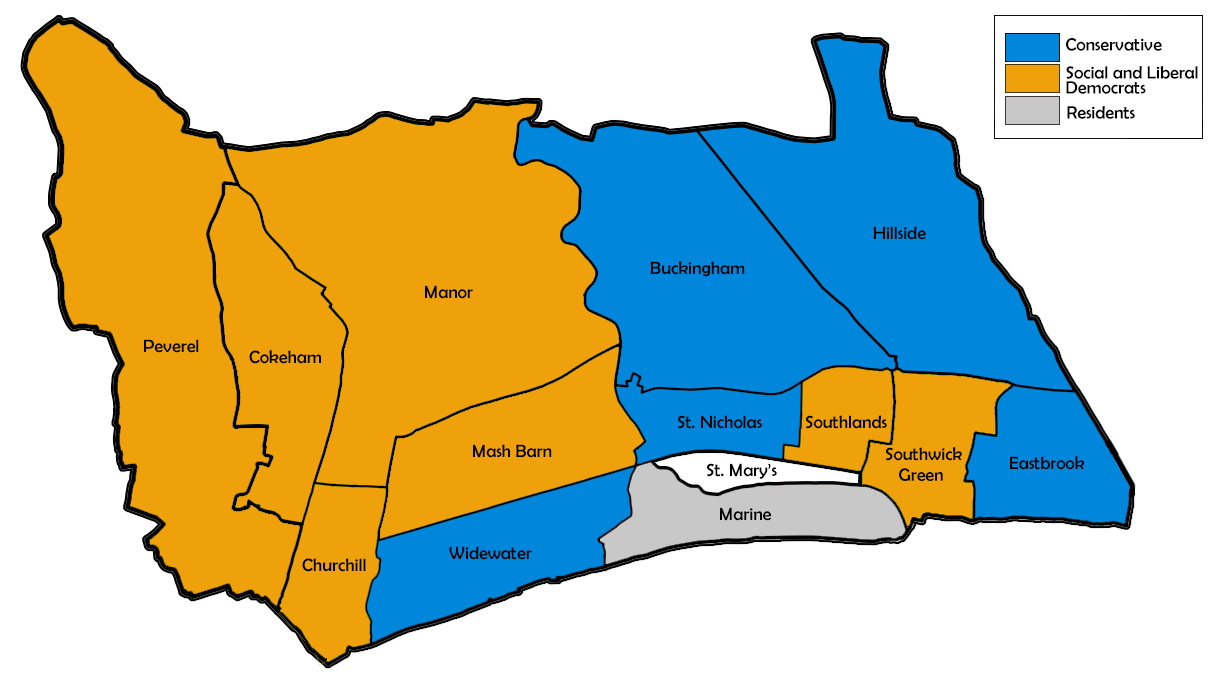
- Map showing the results of the 1988 Adur council elections.
Majority party before election
Social and Liberal Democrats
Majority party after election
Social and Liberal Democrats

Elections to the Adur District Council were held on 5 May 1988, with one third of the council up for election however no elections were held for the single-member ward St Mary's. Overall turnout dropped to 42.5%.

The election resulted in the new merger Social and Liberal Democrats retaining control of the council.

== Election result ==
Adur District Council Election Result 1988
Party	Seats	Gains	Losses	Net gain/loss	Seats %	Votes %	Votes	+/−
SLD	7	1	1	0	53.8	39.1	7,650	-5.0
Conservative	5	1	1	0	38.5	47.3	9,244	+0.7
Residents	1	0	0	0	7.7	4.1	810	+4.1
Labour	0	0	0	0	0.0	9.5	1,848	+0.2

This resulted in the following composition of the council:

Party	Previous council	New council
Social and Liberal Democrats	22	22
Conservative	15	15
Independent Residents	2	2
Total	39	39
Working majority	5	5

== Ward results ==
+/- figures represent changes from the last time these wards were contested.

Buckingham (3933)
Party	Candidate	Votes	%	±%
Conservative	Pelling C.	1,137	69.7	+3.8
SLD	Miller A.	369	22.6	−11.5
Labour	Gibbs J. Ms.	126	7.7	+7.7
Majority		768	47.1	+15.3
Turnout		1,632	41.5	−8.3
Conservative hold		Swing	+7.6	

Churchill (3711)
Party	Candidate	Votes	%	±%
SLD	Ferris M.	810	54.4	+6.7
Conservative	Wood J.	678	45.6	+1.1
Majority		132	8.9	+5.7
Turnout		1,488	40.1	−9.5
SLD hold		Swing	+2.8	

Cokeham (3525)
Party	Candidate	Votes	%	±%
SLD	Smith J.	579	42.9	−3.6
Conservative	Catchpole W.	515	38.1	−2.2
Labour	Mear B.	256	19.0	+5.8
Majority		64	4.7	−1.4
Turnout		1,350	38.3	−4.3
SLD hold		Swing	-0.7	

Eastbrook (3614)
Party	Candidate	Votes	%	±%
Conservative	Parkin N.	748	48.5	+1.2
SLD	Taylor S.	455	29.5	−8.4
Labour	Barnes S.	340	22.0	+7.2
Majority		293	19.0	+9.5
Turnout		1,543	42.7	−13.8
Conservative hold		Swing	+4.8	

Hillside (3631)
Party	Candidate	Votes	%	±%
Conservative	Leeves C.	852	51.2	−6.6
SLD	Whitmore L.	811	48.8	+24.0
Majority		41	2.5	−30.5
Turnout		1,663	45.8	−1.0
Conservative hold		Swing	-15.3	

Manor (3407)
Party	Candidate	Votes	%	±%
SLD	Cooper M.*	724	46.3	−9.0
Conservative	Boyce G.	716	45.8	+1.1
Labour	Lower J. Ms.	124	7.9	+7.9
Majority		8	0.5	−10.1
Turnout		1,564	45.9	−3.4
SLD hold		Swing	-5.0	

Marine (2677)
Party	Candidate	Votes	%	±%
Residents	Shepard P.*	810	57.5	N/A
Conservative	Patten E.	520	36.9	N/A
Labour	Sweet G. Ms.	78	5.5	N/A
Majority		290	20.6	N/A
Turnout		1,408	52.6	N/A
Residents hold		Swing	N/A	

Mash Barn (3008)
Party	Candidate	Votes	%	±%
SLD	Robinson J. Ms.	554	51.9	−31.0
Conservative	Kemp C.	399	37.4	+37.4
Labour	Atkins B.	115	10.8	−6.4
Majority		155	14.5	−51.3
Turnout		1,068	35.5	+3.5
SLD hold		Swing	-34.2	

Peverel (3211)
Party	Candidate	Votes	%	±%
SLD	Driscoll P. Ms.*	473	42.0	−6.7
Conservative	Harris F.	462	41.0	+0.0
Labour	Atkins H. Ms.	192	17.0	+6.7
Majority		11	1.0	−6.6
Turnout		1,127	35.1	−10.3
SLD hold		Swing	-3.3	

Southlands (3366)
Party	Candidate	Votes	%	±%
SLD	Bucknall G.	715	50.8	−0.5
Conservative	Muirhead J. Ms.	471	33.5	+0.6
Labour	Sweet N.	221	15.7	−0.1
Majority		244	17.3	−1.2
Turnout		1,407	41.8	−10.2
SLD gain from Conservative		Swing	-0.5	

Southwick Green (3897)
Party	Candidate	Votes	%	±%
SLD	King M.*	1,031	57.8	−0.1
Conservative	Macpherson M.	754	42.2	+0.1
Majority		277	15.6	−0.2
Turnout		1,785	45.8	−5.5
SLD hold		Swing	-0.1	

St. Nicolas (3723)
Party	Candidate	Votes	%	±%
Conservative	Finch B.*	1,005	62.9	−1.2
SLD	Pressley N.	377	23.6	−2.1
Labour	O'Hare J.	215	13.5	+3.2
Majority		628	39.3	+0.9
Turnout		1,597	42.9	−6.6
Conservative hold		Swing	+0.4	

Widewater (4257)
Party	Candidate	Votes	%	±%
Conservative	Phillips D.	987	51.4	+1.3
SLD	Hammond D.*	752	39.2	−1.5
Labour	Satchell A. Ms.	181	9.4	+0.1
Majority		235	12.2	+2.8
Turnout		1,920	45.1	−3.3
Conservative gain from SLD		Swing	+1.4	
