= 2010 Adur District Council election =

2010 UK local government election

Map of the results of the 2010 Adur council election. Conservatives in blue, Liberal Democrats in yellow and Residents in white.

The 2010 Adur District Council election took place on 6 May 2010 to elect members of Adur District Council in West Sussex, England. Half of the council was up for election and the Conservative Party stayed in overall control of the council.

After the election, the composition of the council was:

- Conservative 25
- Liberal Democrat 2
- Shoreham Beach Residents Association 2

== Results ==
The results saw the Conservatives remain in control of the council after winning 12 of the 15 seats which were contested. They regained seats in Buckingham and Southlands wards which had been lost when the sitting councillors Gavin Ayling and Carl English had defected to the Liberal Democrats. However the Conservatives also lost a seat to the Liberal Democrats in Eastbrook, where Gavin Ayling was elected as a Liberal Democrat.

Adur local election result 2010
Party	Seats	Gains	Losses	Net gain/loss	Seats %	Votes %	Votes	+/−
Conservative	12	2	1	+1	80.0	41.3	13,483	-9.2%
Liberal Democrats	2	1	2	-1	13.3	24.1	7,892	+1.2%
Shoreham Beach Residents Association	1	0	0	0	6.7	4.8	1,557	-3.6%
Labour	0	0	0	0	0	12.6	4,109	+1.6%
UKIP	0	0	0	0	0	11.2	3,656	+8.2%
Green	0	0	0	0	0	6.1	1,987	+1.9%

== Ward results ==
Buckingham
Party	Candidate	Votes	%	±%
Conservative	Emma Evans	1,301	55.9	−15.1
Liberal Democrats	Robert King	828	35.6	+23.7
UKIP	Mick Clark	197	8.5	+8.5
Majority		473	20.3	−28.8
Turnout		2,326	74	+40
Conservative gain from Liberal Democrats		Swing	-19.4	

Churchill
Party	Candidate	Votes	%	±%
Conservative	Carol Albury	885	42.6	
Liberal Democrats	Stephen Martin	762	36.7	
UKIP	David Bushell	314	15.1	
Green	Roger Lightbown	117	5.6	
Majority		123	5.9	
Turnout		2,078	60	+30
Conservative hold		Swing		

Cokeham
Party	Candidate	Votes	%	±%
Conservative	David Simmons	923	42.2	−13.0
Liberal Democrats	Cyril Cannings	594	27.1	+7.5
Labour	Barry Mear	446	20.4	−4.8
UKIP	David Bamber	226	10.3	+10.3
Majority		329	15.0	−15.0
Turnout		2,189	64	+33
Conservative hold		Swing	-10.2	

Eastbrook (2)
Party	Candidate	Votes	%	±%
Conservative	Jim Funnell	855		
Liberal Democrats	Gavin Ayling	711		
Labour	Steve Carden	648		
Conservative	Luke Osborne	595		
UKIP	Jenny Greig	348		
Green	Catherine Hunt	338		
Turnout		3,495	63	+34
Conservative hold		Swing		
Liberal Democrats gain from Conservative		Swing		

Hillside
Party	Candidate	Votes	%	±%
Conservative	Janet Mockridge	1,008	47.8	−10.7
Liberal Democrats	David Edey	667	31.6	+20.2
UKIP	Rupert Greig	294	13.9	−0.4
Green	Vincent Tilsley	141	6.7	+6.7
Majority		341	16.2	−26.5
Turnout		2,110	64	+33
Conservative hold		Swing	-15.4	

Manor
Party	Candidate	Votes	%	±%
Conservative	Stephanie Hedley-Barnes	1,050	48.9	−19.6
Liberal Democrats	Stuart Douch	728	33.9	+12.8
UKIP	Lionel Parsons	369	17.2	+17.2
Majority		322	15.0	−32.4
Turnout		2,147	68	+35
Conservative hold		Swing	-16.3	

Marine
Party	Candidate	Votes	%	±%
Shoreham Beach Residents Association	Ben Stride	1,299	53.8	
Green	Jennie Tindall	505	20.9	
UKIP	Peter Harvey	333	13.8	
Labour	Nigel Sweet	276	11.4	
Majority		794	32.9	
Turnout		2,413	70	+36
Shoreham Beach Residents Association hold		Swing		

Mash Barn
Party	Candidate	Votes	%	±%
Liberal Democrats	Richard Burt	815	41.9	+13.6
Conservative	Vicky Parkin	787	40.5	−12.4
UKIP	Ron Horne	343	17.6	+8.0
Majority		28	1.4	
Turnout		1,945	59	+31
Liberal Democrats hold		Swing	+13.0	

Peverel
Party	Candidate	Votes	%	±%
Conservative	Brian Boggis	1,047	47.8	−11.8
Liberal Democrats	Raj Dooraree	478	21.8	+2.6
Labour	Kenneth Bashford	446	20.4	+6.9
UKIP	Reuben Whiting	218	10.0	+2.2
Majority		569	26.0	−14.4
Turnout		2,189	64	+35
Conservative hold		Swing	-7.2	

Southlands
Party	Candidate	Votes	%	±%
Conservative	Darren Burns	702	37.7	−18.8
Labour	Andy Bray	547	29.4	+7.2
Liberal Democrats	Carl English	442	23.7	+11.8
UKIP	Frank Mills	171	9.2	+9.2
Majority		155	8.3	−26.0
Turnout		1,862	63	+32
Conservative gain from Liberal Democrats		Swing	-13.0	

Southwick Green
Party	Candidate	Votes	%	±%
Conservative	Julie Searle	995	41.9	−14.1
Liberal Democrats	John Hilditch	525	22.1	+7.9
Labour	Ian Lidbetter	355	15.0	+2.5
Independent	Beryl Ferrers-Guy	258	10.9	+10.9
UKIP	Brian Elliott	128	5.4	−3.1
Green	Patrick Ginnelly	111	4.7	−4.2
Majority		470	19.8	−22.0
Turnout		2,372	67	+33
Conservative hold		Swing	-11.0	

St Mary's
Party	Candidate	Votes	%	±%
Conservative	Mike Mendoza	864	41.6	−8.1
Labour	Ricky Daniel	558	26.9	+13.7
Green	Susan Board	406	19.5	−1.0
UKIP	Mike Henn	250	12.0	+4.9
Majority		306	14.7	−14.5
Turnout		2,078	63	+31
Conservative hold		Swing	-10.9	

St Nicolas
Party	Candidate	Votes	%	±%
Conservative	Neil Parkin	1,114	47.5	−14.9
Liberal Democrats	Pauline Francis	525	22.4	+10.3
Labour	Simon Crisp	339	14.5	+3.3
Green	Moyra Martin	234	10.0	−4.3
UKIP	Alan Minter	131	5.6	+5.6
Majority		589	25.1	−23.0
Turnout		2,343	75	+40
Conservative hold		Swing	-12.6	

Widewater
Party	Candidate	Votes	%	±%
Conservative	Mary Hamblin	1,357	43.3	
Liberal Democrats	Doris Martin	817	26.0	
Labour	David Devoy	494	15.7	
UKIP	George Osborne	334	10.6	
Green	Celia Behan	135	4.3	
Majority		540	17.3	
Turnout		3,137	67	+30
Conservative hold		Swing		
