= 1987 Adur District Council election =

1987 UK local government election

← 1986	7 May 1987	1988 →

One third of seats (15 of 39) to Adur District Council 20 seats needed for a majority
	First party	Second party	Third party
Party	Alliance	Conservative	Labour
Seats won	8	7	0
Seat change	Steady	Steady	Steady
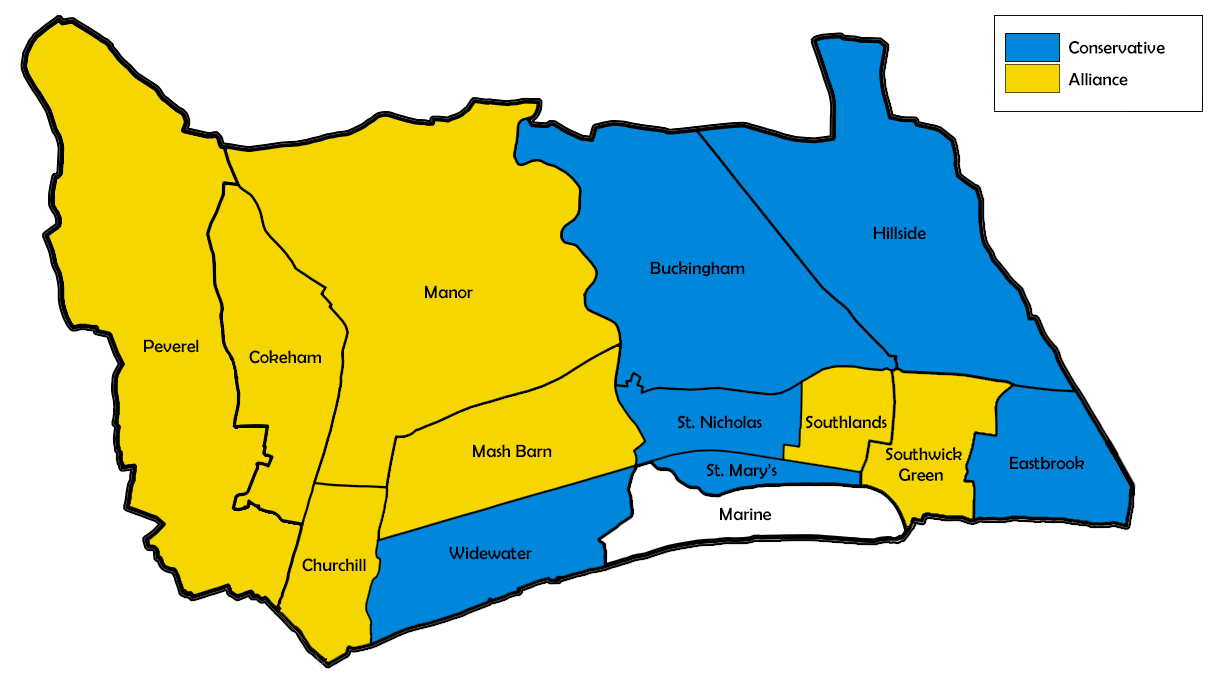
- Map showing the results of the 1987 Adur council elections.
Majority party before election
SDP-Liberal Alliance
Majority party after election
SDP-Liberal Alliance

Elections to the Adur District Council were held on 7 May 1987, with one third of the council up for election. There were additional vacancies in the Churchill and Widewater wards and no elections for the two-member Marine ward. Overall turnout climbed to 48.3%.

The election resulted in the Alliance retaining control of the council.

== Election result ==
Adur District Council Election Result 1987
Party	Seats	Gains	Losses	Net gain/loss	Seats %	Votes %	Votes	+/−
Alliance	8	1	1	0	53.3	44.1	9,522	+1.3
Conservative	7	1	1	0	46.7	46.6	10,068	+11.4
Labour	0	0	0	0	0.0	9.3	2,003	-4.9

This resulted in the following composition of the council:

Party	Previous council	New council
SDP-Liberal Alliance	22	22
Conservative	15	15
Independent Residents	2	2
Total	39	39
Working majority	5	5

== Ward results ==
+/- figures represent changes from the last time these wards were contested.

Buckingham (4013)
Party	Candidate	Votes	%	±%
Conservative	Merrick A.	1,317	65.9	+8.6
Alliance	Hammond G. Ms.	682	34.1	+1.9
Majority		635	31.8	+6.8
Turnout		1,999	49.8	+6.6
Conservative hold		Swing	+3.3	

Churchill (3792)
Party	Candidate	Votes	%	±%
Alliance	Sherwood R.	897	47.7	−3.5
Alliance	Ford A.	886		
Conservative	Wood J.	836	44.5	+4.9
Conservative	Gray W. Ms.	834		
Labour	Aldrich S. Ms.	146	7.8	−1.4
Majority		61	3.2	−8.5
Turnout		1,879	49.6	+4.8
Alliance hold		Swing		
Alliance hold		Swing	-4.2	

Cokeham (3586)
Party	Candidate	Votes	%	±%
Alliance	Purdie D.	711	46.5	−8.8
Conservative	Kemp C.	617	40.4	+9.2
Labour	Mear B.	201	13.1	
Majority		94	6.1	−18.0
Turnout		1,529	42.6	+5.1
Alliance hold		Swing	-9.0	

Eastbrook (3644)
Party	Candidate	Votes	%	±%
Conservative	Dunn R.	975	47.3	+12.1
Alliance	Taylor S.	780	37.8	−1.9
Labour	Morris C.	306	14.8	−10.2
Majority		195	9.5	+4.9
Turnout		2,061	56.5	+4.1
Conservative hold		Swing	+7.0	

Hillside (3716)
Party	Candidate	Votes	%	±%
Conservative	Barber R.	1,006	57.8	+16.0
Alliance	Whitmore L.	431	24.8	+5.2
Labour	Sweet G. Ms.	303	17.4	−21.2
Majority		575	33.0	+29.8
Turnout		1,740	46.8	−0.4
Conservative hold		Swing	+5.4	

Manor (3489)
Party	Candidate	Votes	%	±%
Alliance	Robinson C.	952	55.3	+0.6
Conservative	Chad R.	769	44.7	+6.6
Majority		183	10.6	−6.0
Turnout		1,721	49.3	−2.0
Alliance hold		Swing	-3.0	

Mash Barn (3081)
Party	Candidate	Votes	%	±%
Alliance	Robinson J. Ms.	818	82.9	+25.1
Labour	Atkins B.	169	17.1	+5.0
Majority		649	65.8	+38.1
Turnout		987	32.0	−5.6
Alliance hold		Swing	+10.0	

Peverel (3316)
Party	Candidate	Votes	%	±%
Alliance	Spruce P.	732	48.6	−14.2
Conservative	Harris F.	617	41.0	+15.4
Labour	Atkins H. Ms.	156	10.4	−1.1
Majority		115	7.6	−29.6
Turnout		1,505	45.4	+4.6
Alliance hold		Swing	-9.8	

Southlands (3427)
Party	Candidate	Votes	%	±%
Alliance	Little S.	917	51.3	+0.2
Conservative	Hermans G. Ms.	587	32.8	−0.6
Labour	Sweet N.	283	15.8	+0.3
Majority		330	18.5	+0.8
Turnout		1,787	52.0	+1.7
Alliance hold		Swing	+0.4	

Southwick Green (3922)
Party	Candidate	Votes	%	±%
Alliance	Bucknall S. Ms.	1,162	57.8	+7.9
Conservative	Maltby C.	848	42.2	+42.2
Majority		314	15.6	+7.0
Turnout		2,010	51.3	+6.0
Alliance gain from Conservative		Swing	-17.1	

St. Marys (878)
Party	Candidate	Votes	%	±%
Conservative	Marchant R.	256	60.1	N/A
Alliance	Bienati C. Ms.	116	27.2	N/A
Labour	Gibbs L.	54	12.7	N/A
Majority		140	32.9	N/A
Turnout		426	48.5	N/A
Conservative hold		Swing	N/A	

St. Nicolas (3781)
Party	Candidate	Votes	%	±%
Conservative	Lucraft J. Ms.	1,201	64.1	+15.1
Alliance	Gough R.	481	25.7	−5.9
Labour	Barnes S.	192	10.2	−1.4
Majority		720	38.4	+21.0
Turnout		1,874	49.5	+2.0
Conservative hold		Swing	+10.5	

Widewater (4213)2
Party	Candidate	Votes	%	±%
Conservative	Floyd J.	1,039	50.1	+5.5
Conservative	Forshaw G.	1,016		
Alliance	Barrow R.	843	40.6	−5.4
Alliance	Cooper M. Ms.	822		
Labour	Allwright R.	193	9.3	−0.1
Majority		196	9.4	+7.9
Turnout		2,075	48.4	+2.9
Conservative hold		Swing		
Conservative gain from Alliance		Swing	+5.4	
