= 1980 Adur District Council election =

1980 UK local government election

← 1979	1 May 1980	1982 →

One third of seats (14 of 39) to Adur District Council 20 seats needed for a majority
	First party	Second party	Third party
Party	Liberal	Conservative	Labour
Seats won	9	3	1
Seat change	▲3	▼4	▲1
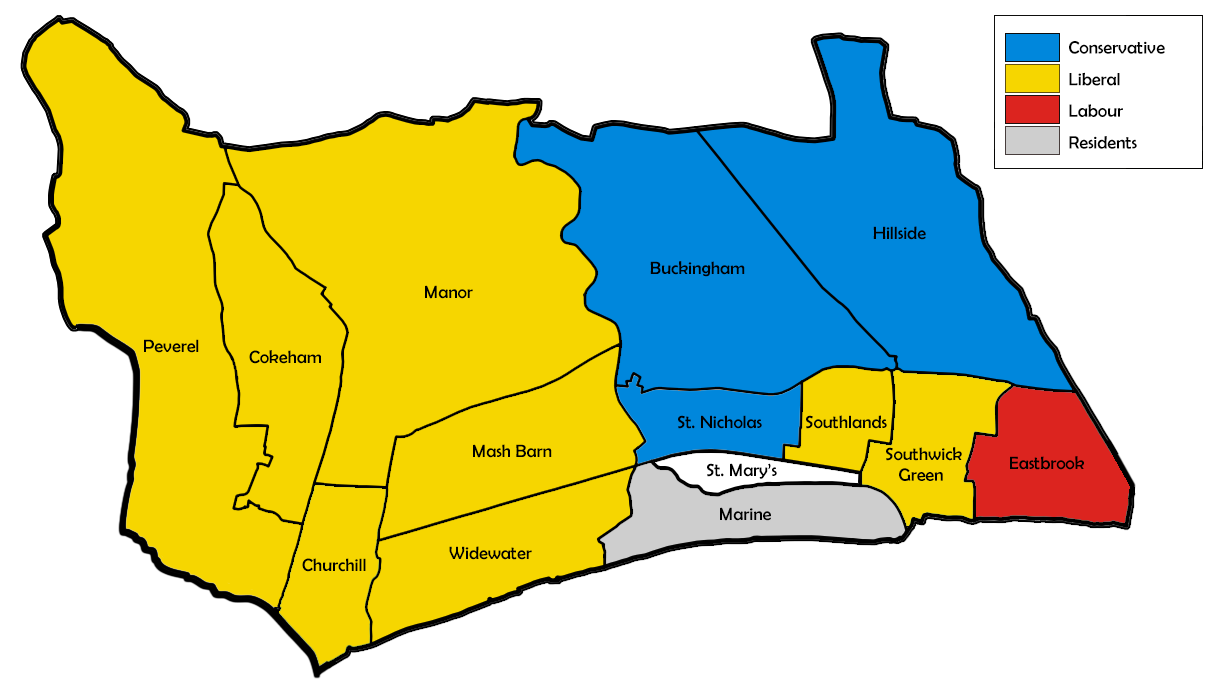
- Map showing the results of the 1980 Adur council elections.
Majority party before election
Conservative
Majority party after election
Liberal

Elections to the Adur District Council were held on 1 May 1980, with one third of the council up for election. There was an additional vacancy in the Southwick Green ward, and no elections for the single-member ward St Marys. Overall turnout dropped to 48.7%.

The election resulted in the Liberals gaining control of the council from the Conservatives.

== Election result ==
Adur District Council Election Result 1980
Party	Seats	Gains	Losses	Net gain/loss	Seats %	Votes %	Votes	+/−
Liberal	9	3	0	+3	64.3	44.7	9,158	+9.4
Conservative	3	0	4	-4	21.4	37.3	7,627	-7.8
Labour	1	1	0	+1	7.1	14.0	2,858	-1.6
Residents	1	0	0	0	7.1	4.0	826	+0.0

This resulted in the following composition of the council:

Party	Previous council	New council
Liberal	17	20
Conservative	20	16
Independent Residents	2	2
Labour	0	1
Total	39	39
Working majority	1	1

== Ward results ==
+/- figures represent changes from the last time these wards were contested.

Buckingham (4050)
Party	Candidate	Votes	%	±%
Conservative	Smith M.	958	62.7	+1.9
Liberal	Wright G. Ms.	414	27.1	−0.5
Labour	Snowden H.	155	10.2	−1.4
Majority		544	35.6	+2.4
Turnout		1,527	37.7	−42.4
Conservative hold		Swing	+1.2	

Churchill (3758)
Party	Candidate	Votes	%	±%
Liberal	Denyer P.	1,010	54.5	+14.7
Conservative	Chorlton S.	675	36.4	−10.1
Labour	Hellenburgh S. Ms.	168	9.1	−4.6
Majority		335	18.1	+11.4
Turnout		1,853	49.3	−25.9
Liberal gain from Conservative		Swing	+12.4	

Cokeham (3597)
Party	Candidate	Votes	%	±%
Liberal	Spalding M.	957	59.0	+9.4
Conservative	Lodge R.	536	33.0	−4.2
Labour	Woods J. Ms.	130	8.0	−5.2
Majority		421	25.9	+13.6
Turnout		1,623	45.1	−34.2
Liberal hold		Swing	+6.8	

Eastbrook (3666)
Party	Candidate	Votes	%	±%
Labour	Whipp B.	748	41.3	−3.5
Conservative	Sayers M.	617	34.1	−21.1
Liberal	Dolding R.	445	24.6	+24.6
Majority		131	7.2	−3.2
Turnout		1,810	49.4	−16.3
Labour gain from Conservative		Swing	+8.8	

Hillside (3904)
Party	Candidate	Votes	%	±%
Conservative	Moore M.	718	41.4	−8.9
Labour	Greig P.	602	34.7	+8.5
Liberal	Easeman D.	415	23.9	+0.4
Majority		116	6.7	−17.4
Turnout		1,735	44.4	−38.0
Conservative hold		Swing	-8.7	

Manor (3352)
Party	Candidate	Votes	%	±%
Liberal	Cooper M.	880	53.2	−3.5
Conservative	Lewis J.	683	41.3	−2.0
Labour	Bridson J. Ms.	91	5.5	+5.5
Majority		197	11.9	−1.6
Turnout		1,654	49.3	−27.0
Liberal hold		Swing	-0.7	

Marine (2589)
Party	Candidate	Votes	%	±%
Residents	Shephard P.	826	72.0	+6.8
Conservative	Harding I. Ms.	259	22.6	−6.0
Labour	Gibson C.	62	5.4	−0.8
Majority		567	49.4	+12.8
Turnout		1,147	44.3	−39.5
Residents hold		Swing	+6.4	

Mash Barn (2947)
Party	Candidate	Votes	%	±%
Liberal	Deedman D.	869	67.1	+15.9
Conservative	Chad R.	323	24.9	−12.0
Labour	Harwood R.	104	8.0	−3.9
Majority		546	42.1	+27.9
Turnout		1,296	44.0	−28.8
Liberal hold		Swing	+13.9	

Peverel (3171)
Party	Candidate	Votes	%	±%
Liberal	Hall M. Ms.	760	59.6	+8.7
Conservative	Prattley J.	375	29.4	−5.4
Labour	Atkins H. Ms.	141	11.1	−3.3
Majority		385	30.2	+14.1
Turnout		1,276	40.2	−34.8
Liberal hold		Swing	+7.0	

Southlands (3237)
Party	Candidate	Votes	%	±%
Liberal	Robinson J.	797	57.5	+8.8
Conservative	Osmond P.	364	26.3	−10.5
Labour	Matthews M. Ms.	225	16.2	+1.6
Majority		433	31.2	+19.3
Turnout		1,386	42.8	−29.0
Liberal hold		Swing	+9.6	

Southwick Green (3506)
Party	Candidate	Votes	%	±%
Liberal	King M.	854	48.4	+20.9
Liberal	Stanley A.	732		
Conservative	Sweet I. Ms.	717	40.6	−11.4
Conservative	Hale D.	650		
Labour	Watson A.	193	10.9	−9.5
Majority		137	7.8	−16.7
Turnout		1,764	50.3	−21.4
Liberal gain from Conservative		Swing		
Liberal gain from Conservative		Swing	+16.1	

St. Nicolas (3664)
Party	Candidate	Votes	%	±%
Conservative	Gumbrell P.	806	49.0	−1.2
Liberal	Attrill D. Ms.	702	42.7	+6.3
Labour	Wright E.	136	8.3	−5.1
Majority		104	6.3	−7.6
Turnout		1,644	44.9	−30.9
Conservative hold		Swing	-3.7	

Widewater (3987)
Party	Candidate	Votes	%	±%
Liberal	Hammond D.	1,055	60.1	+15.3
Conservative	Huber S. Ms.	596	34.0	−9.8
Labour	Jacques W.	103	5.9	−5.5
Majority		459	26.2	+25.1
Turnout		1,754	44.0	−31.4
Liberal hold		Swing	+12.5	
