= 2002 Adur District Council election =

2002 UK local government election

Elections to Adur District Council were held on 2 May 2002. One third of the council was up for election and the Conservative Party gained control of the council from no overall control. Overall turnout was 33%.

The Conservatives won 9 of the 14 seats up for election after the Liberal Democrats did not stand any candidates.

After the election, the composition of the council was:

- Conservative 23
- Labour 11
- Independent 4
- Liberal Democrat 1

== Results ==
Adur local election result 2002
Party	Seats	Gains	Losses	Net gain/loss	Seats %	Votes %	Votes	+/−
Conservative	9	5	0	+5	64.3	49.3	7,856	+8.5%
Labour	4	0	1	-1	28.6	40.6	6,468	+12.2%
Independent	1	0	0	0	7.1	4.8	765	-3.0%
UKIP	0	0	0	0	0	2.1	341	+2.1%
Green	0	0	0	0	0	1.7	264	+1.7%
Socialist Alliance	0	0	0	0	0	0.8	132	+0.8%
Liberal Democrats	0	0	4	-4	0	0.7	109	-22.2%

== Ward results ==
Buckingham
Party	Candidate	Votes	%	±%
Conservative	Melanie Blunden	892	68.9	+5.7
Labour	Peter Osmond	293	22.6	+9.2
Liberal Democrats	Peter West	109	8.4	−14.6
Majority		599	46.3	+6.1
Turnout		1,294		

Churchill
Party	Candidate	Votes	%	±%
Conservative	Graham Kerner	680	56.4	+18.8
Labour	Joyce Bridges	394	32.7	−0.8
Socialist Alliance	Jane Bromley	132	10.9	+10.9
Majority		286	23.7	+19.6
Turnout		1,206		

Cokeham
Party	Candidate	Votes	%	±%
Labour	Kenneth Bashford	590	57.9	+7.2
Conservative	Suzanne McGregor	429	42.1	+18.2
Majority		161	15.8	−9.5
Turnout		1,019		

Eastbrook
Party	Candidate	Votes	%	±%
Labour	David Munnery	702	56.8	+14.5
Conservative	Paul Berseford-Hough	534	43.2	+0.0
Majority		168	13.6	
Turnout		1,236		

Hillside
Party	Candidate	Votes	%	±%
Labour	Sally Willson	756	55.8	+21.2
Conservative	Kathryn Lyon	599	44.2	+0.1
Majority		157	11.6	+2.1
Turnout		1,355		

Manor
Party	Candidate	Votes	%	±%
Conservative	Keith Dollemore	583	54.7	+15.8
Labour	Ronald Horne	280	26.3	+14.0
UKIP	Lionel Parsons	203	19.0	+19.0
Majority		303	28.4	
Turnout		1,066		

Marine
Party	Candidate	Votes	%	±%
Independent	Maurice Pitchford	765	74.7	
Green	Moyra Martin	143	14.0	
Labour	Stephen Mear	116	11.3	
Majority		622	60.7	
Turnout		1,024		

Mash Barn (2)
Party	Candidate	Votes	%	±%
Conservative	Susan Alexander	419		
Conservative	Carol Bradburn	411		
Labour	Ann Bridges	382		
Labour	Jeanette White	357		
Turnout		1,568		

Peverel
Party	Candidate	Votes	%	±%
Conservative	Michael Mendoza	514	55.5	+14.0
Labour	John Wales	412	44.5	+15.7
Majority		102	11.0	−0.8
Turnout		926		

St. Nicolas
Party	Candidate	Votes	%	±%
Conservative	Neil Parkin	706	49.8	+5.7
Labour	Phillip Jones	452	31.9	−3.6
UKIP	Kenneth Bishop	138	9.7	+9.7
Green	Vincent Tilsley	121	8.5	+8.5
Majority		254	17.9	+9.3
Turnout		1,417		

Southlands
Party	Candidate	Votes	%	±%
Labour	Julia King	601	51.6	+9.3
Conservative	Felicity Deen	563	48.4	+3.6
Majority		38	3.2	
Turnout		1,164		

Southwick Green
Party	Candidate	Votes	%	±%
Conservative	Julie Searle	692	61.2	
Labour	Alan Mair	438	38.8	
Majority		254	22.4	
Turnout		1,130		

Widewater
Party	Candidate	Votes	%	±%
Conservative	Anthony Nicklen	834	54.5	+1.9
Labour	Adrienne Lowe	695	45.5	+14.3
Majority		139	9.0	−12.4
Turnout		1,529		
