= 2003 Adur District Council election =

2003 UK local government election

Elections to Adur District Council were held on 1 May 2003. One third of the council was up for election and the Conservative Party held overall control of the council. Overall turnout was 31.7%.

After the election, the composition of the council was:

- Conservative 27
- Labour 8
- Independent 4

== Results ==
Adur local election result 2003
Party	Seats	Gains	Losses	Net gain/loss	Seats %	Votes %	Votes	+/−
Conservative	11			+4	73.3	46.8	7,167	-2.5%
Labour	4			-3	26.7	31.5	4,831	-9.1%
Liberal Democrats	0	0	0	0	0	11.2	1,713	+10.5%
Independent	0			-1	0	4.0	607	-0.8%
Green	0	0	0	0	0	3.6	556	+1.9%
UKIP	0	0	0	0	0	2.9	442	+0.8%

== Ward results ==
Buckingham
Party	Candidate	Votes	%	±%
Conservative	Debra Kennard	901	69.1	+0.2
Labour	Peter Osmond	257	19.7	−2.9
Green	Frank Tilsley	145	11.1	+11.1
Majority		644	49.4	+3.1
Turnout		1,303	34	

Churchill
Party	Candidate	Votes	%	±%
Conservative	Carol Bradburn	433	40.3	−16.1
Liberal Democrats	Roy Gibson	235	21.9	+21.9
Independent	Joy Hartley	214	19.9	+19.9
Labour	Jeannette White	192	17.9	−14.8
Majority		198	18.4	−5.3
Turnout		1,074	28	

Cokeham
Party	Candidate	Votes	%	±%
Labour	Daniel Yate	553	55.4	−2.5
Conservative	Brian Boggis	444	44.5	+2.4
Majority		109	10.9	−4.9
Turnout		997	28	

Eastbrook
Party	Candidate	Votes	%	±%
Conservative	Carol Eade	562	46.0	+2.8
Labour	Simon Thorpe	488	40.0	−16.8
Liberal Democrats	Jacqueline Painter	171	14.0	+14.0
Majority		74	6.0	
Turnout		1,221	35	

Hillside
Party	Candidate	Votes	%	±%
Conservative	Kenneth Eade	602	50.4	+6.2
Labour	Brian Whipp	419	35.1	−20.7
Liberal Democrats	Robert King	174	14.6	+14.6
Majority		183	15.3	
Turnout		1,195	36	

Manor
Party	Candidate	Votes	%	±%
Conservative	Angela Mills	485	47.1	−7.6
Labour	Jean Woolgar	239	23.2	−3.1
Independent	Denise Ferris	170	16.5	+16.5
UKIP	Lionel Parsons	136	13.2	−5.8
Majority		246	23.9	−4.5
Turnout		1,030	31	

Mash Barn
Party	Candidate	Votes	%	±%
Conservative	Nicola Eves	247	35.5	
Liberal Democrats	Richard Burt	193	27.8	
Labour	Ann Bridges	153	22.0	
Independent	Patrick Beresford	81	11.7	
Green	Peter Franks-Lovell	21	3.0	
Majority		54	7.7	
Turnout		695	24	

Peverel (2)
Party	Candidate	Votes	%	±%
Conservative	Brenda Collard	419		
Conservative	Andrew McGregor	402		
Labour	Joyce Burns	228		
Liberal Democrats	Timothy Clarke	214		
Labour	John Wales	180		
Turnout		1,443	26	

St. Mary's
Party	Candidate	Votes	%	±%
Labour	Geoffrey Howitt	286	74.3	
Conservative	Henry Treadwell	99	25.7	
Majority		187	48.6	
Turnout		385	45	

St. Nicolas
Party	Candidate	Votes	%	±%
Conservative	Michael Howard	642	48.5	−1.3
Labour	Alan Heselden	360	27.2	−4.7
Green	Moyra Martin	203	15.3	+6.8
UKIP	Kenneth Bishop	119	9.0	−0.7
Majority		282	21.3	+3.4
Turnout		1,324	35	

Southlands (2)
Party	Candidate	Votes	%	±%
Labour	Peter Berry	503		
Labour	Sue-Ellen Murrell-Ashworth	385		
Conservative	Felicity Deen	364		
Conservative	Laura Graysmark	361		
Liberal Democrats	Sydney Little	170		
Green	Louis Gibbs	109		
UKIP	Eric Faulkner-Little	108		
UKIP	Michael Henn	79		
Turnout		2,079	36	

Southwick Green
Party	Candidate	Votes	%	±%
Conservative	Iris Betty	544	50.6	−10.6
Labour	Steven Carden	261	24.3	−14.5
Liberal Democrats	Anthony Stuart	192	17.9	+17.9
Green	Esther Rees	78	7.3	+7.3
Majority		283	26.3	+3.9
Turnout		1,075	29	

Widewater
Party	Candidate	Votes	%	±%
Conservative	Christine Turner	662	44.3	−10.2
Liberal Democrats	Doris Martin	364	24.3	+24.3
Labour	Adrienne Lowe	327	21.9	−23.6
Independent	Edwina Weekes	142	9.5	+9.5
Majority		298	20.0	+11.0
Turnout		1,495	33	
