= 1999 Adur District Council election =

1999 UK local government election

The 1999 Adur District Council election took place on 6 May 1999 to elect members of Adur District Council in West Sussex, England. One third of the council was up for election and the Liberal Democrat party lost overall control of the council to no overall control.

After the election, the composition of the council was:

- Labour 15
- Liberal Democrat 13
- Conservative 8
- Independent 2

== Results ==
The results saw the Liberal Democrats lose their majority on a council they had controlled since 1986. Overall turnout in the election was 38%.

Adur local election result 1999
Party	Seats	Gains	Losses	Net gain/loss	Seats %	Votes %	Votes	+/−
Labour	8			+6	53.3			
Liberal Democrats	5			-8	33.3			
Conservative	2			+2	13.3			
