= 2021 Adur District Council election =

Election in England

Map showing the results of the 2021 Adur District Council election

The 2021 Adur District Council elections took place on 6 May 2021 to elect members of Adur District Council in West Sussex, England. Half of the council was up for election, and the Conservative Party remained in overall control of the council.

These seats were due to be contested in 2020 but were delayed by one year due to the COVID-19 pandemic. This election was held concurrently with other elections across the United Kingdom.

== Results ==
2021 Adur District Council election
Party	This election			Full council			This election		
Party	Seats	Net	Seats %	Other	Total	Total %	Votes	Votes %	+/−
Conservative	11	+2	61.1	8	19	65.5	10,195	44.9	+9.1
Labour	5	±0	27.8	2	7	24.1	7,061	31.1	+6.7
Independent	1	±0	5.6	1	2	6.9	1,122	4.9	-1.6
Green	1	+1	5.6	0	1	3.4	2,913	12.8	+9.7
Liberal Democrats	0	±0	0.0	0	0	0.0	1,352	6.0	-1.3
UKIP	0	-3	0.0	0	0	0.0	80	0.4	-22.7

== Ward results ==
Incumbent councillors are denoted by an asterisk (*)

=== Buckingham ===
Buckingham (1 seat)
Party	Candidate	Votes	%	±%
Conservative	Kevin Boram*	646	49.73	−2.67
Labour	Matt Bannister	364	28.02	+8.32
Green	Leslie Christine Groves-Williams	149	11.47	+4.57
Liberal Democrats	David Peter Batchelor	140	10.78	+3.78
Majority		282	21.71	−11.09
Turnout		1,299	42.04	+10.18
Conservative hold		Swing		

=== Churchill ===
Churchill (2 seats)
Party	Candidate	Votes	%	±%
Conservative	Mandy Buxton	590	50.60	
Conservative	Steve Neocleous	585	50.17	
Labour Co-op	Sylvia Knight	290	24.87	
Labour	Katie Piatt	259	22.21	
Green	Helen Mears	154	13.21	
Liberal Democrats	Steve Male	153	13.12	
Turnout		1,166	34.04	
Conservative hold		Swing		
Conservative gain from UKIP		Swing		

The second seat up for election in this ward was not due to be contested until 2022, but took place due to a vacancy arising.

=== Cokeham ===
Cokeham (1 seat)
Party	Candidate	Votes	%	±%
Conservative	Rob Wilkinson	688	60.89	+31.79
Labour	Richard Aulton	305	26.99	−6.31
Green	Peter Gunnar Groves-Williams	137	12.12	N/A
Majority		383	33.90	
Turnout		1,130	32.79	−0.81
Conservative gain from Labour		Swing		

=== Eastbrook ===
Eastbrook (2 seats)
Party	Candidate	Votes	%	±%
Conservative	James Robert Funnell	580	46.59	
Labour	Carol Joy O’Neal	486	39.04	
Labour	Dan Flower	472	37.91	
Conservative	Jill Lennon	455	36.55	
Green	Patrick George Ginnelly	178	14.30	
Turnout		1,245	36.10	
Conservative gain from Labour		Swing		
Labour hold		Swing		

The second seat up for election in this ward was not due to be contested until 2022, but took place due to a vacancy arising.

=== Hillside ===
Hillside (1 seat)
Party	Candidate	Votes	%	±%
Conservative	Angus Dominic Dunn*	702	62.2	−0.1
Labour	Cheryl Anne Giles	338	29.9	+2.2
Green	Leonie Sarah Harmsworth	89	7.9	+1.3
Majority		364	32.3	−2.3
Turnout		1,129	33.6	+3.2
Conservative hold		Swing		

=== Manor ===
Manor (1 seat)
Party	Candidate	Votes	%	±%
Conservative	Carson Randolph Albury	703	58.58	+21.48
Labour	Steven Carden	235	19.58	+3.58
Green	Maggie Rumble	140	11.67	N/A
Liberal Democrats	Steve Creed	122	10.17	+3.97
Majority		468	39.00	+27.40
Turnout		1,200	37.35	−0.75
Conservative hold		Swing		

=== Marine ===
Marine (1 seat)
Party	Candidate	Votes	%	±%
Independent	Joss Loader*	1,122	68.58	+0.78
Labour	Nigel Robert Sweet	286	17.48	+2.58
Green	Peter Leslie Riley	228	13.94	N/A
Majority		836	51.10	−1.80
Turnout		1,636	46.22	+10.02
Independent hold		Swing		

=== Mash Barn ===
Mash Barn (1 seat)
Party	Candidate	Votes	%	±%
Labour	Sharon Louise Sluman	465	42.12	+22.82
Conservative	Jason Lock	441	39.94	+17.64
Liberal Democrats	Doris Martin	132	11.96	−3.44
Green	Kat Morgan	66	5.98	N/A
Majority		24	2.18	
Turnout		1,104	33.57	+5.17
Labour gain from UKIP		Swing		

=== Peverel ===
Peverel (1 seat)
Party	Candidate	Votes	%	±%
Conservative	Vee Barton*	665	62.09	+16.69
Labour	Anne Page	216	20.17	+2.27
Green	Lynn Marie Finnigan	115	10.74	N/A
Liberal Democrats	Keith John Humphrey	75	7.00	+0.80
Majority		449	41.92	+26.32
Turnout		1,071	31.84	+0.24
Conservative hold		Swing		

=== Southlands ===
Southlands (2 seats)
Party	Candidate	Votes	%	±%
Labour	Deborah Ann Stainforth	462	39.66	
Conservative	Tania Maria Edwards	452	38.80	
Conservative	Bridget Jane Norfolk	395	33.91	
Labour	Simon James Cheverst	363	31.16	
Liberal Democrats	Nico Alexander Kearns	193	16.57	
Green	Anne Younger	137	11.76	
Turnout		1,165	36.94	
Conservative gain from Labour		Swing		
Labour hold		Swing		

The second seat up for election in this ward was not due to be contested until 2022, but took place due to a vacancy arising.

=== Southwick Green ===
Southwick Green (1 seat)
Party	Candidate	Votes	%	±%
Labour	Robina Catherine-Jane Crowther Baine	654	44.52	+20.72
Conservative	Leila Yasmin Williams	593	40.37	−9.63
Liberal Democrats	Ian Anthony Jones	222	15.11	+8.81
Majority		432	29.41	
Turnout		1,469	42.63	+11.13
Labour gain from Conservative		Swing		

=== St. Mary's ===
St. Mary's (1 seat)
Party	Candidate	Votes	%	±%
Labour	Jeremy Marshall Alexander Gardner	754	47.57	+14.17
Conservative	Mike Mendoza	521	32.87	+1.77
Green	Jane Frances Mott	205	12.93	+0.13
Liberal Democrats	Neville James Pressley	105	6.63	−0.77
Majority		233	14.70	+12.50
Turnout		1,585	40.61	+7.81
Labour hold		Swing		

=== St. Nicolas ===
St. Nicolas (1 seat)
Party	Candidate	Votes	%	±%
Green	Gabe Crisp	823	46.84	+37.64
Conservative	Brian Kenneth Coomber	624	35.52	−12.48
Labour Co-op	Adrienne Lowe	310	17.64	−6.06
Majority		199	11.32	
Turnout		1,757	55.78	+16.08
Green gain from Conservative		Swing		

=== Widewater ===
Widewater (2 seats)
Party	Candidate	Votes	%	±%
Conservative	Ann Bridges*	853	52.92	
Conservative	Joe Pannell	702	43.55	
Labour	Pat Alden	445	27.61	
Labour	Stephen Robert Garrard	357	22.15	
Green	Russell Lewis Whiting	243	15.07	
Liberal Democrats	Steve Martin	210	13.03	
UKIP	Bob Virgo	80	4.96	
Turnout		1,612	34.48	
Conservative hold		Swing		
Conservative gain from UKIP		Swing		

== By-elections ==
=== Hillside ===
Hillside: 2 December 2021
Party	Candidate	Votes	%	±%
Conservative	Leila Williams	414	56.2	−6.6
Green	Russell Whiting	175	23.7	+15.9
Labour	Rebecca Allinson	148	20.1	−9.0
Majority		239	32.5	
Turnout		737	21.9	
Conservative hold		Swing	▼11.3	

The Hillside by-election was triggered by the death of councillor David Simmons.
