= 2018 Adur District Council election =

2018 UK local government election

Map of the results of the 2018 Adur District Council election. Conservatives in blue, Labour in red and Independent in grey.

The 2018 Adur District Council elections took place on 3 May 2018 to elect members of Adur District Council in West Sussex, England. The election saw half of the Council's 29 seats up for election, and resulted in the Conservative Party retaining their majority on the council. Labour gained 4 seats to replace UKIP as the official opposition on the Council, who lost all the seats they were defending from 2014.

== Results ==
Adur local election result 2018
Party	Seats	Gains	Losses	Net gain/loss	Seats %	Votes %	Votes	+/−
Conservative	9	+2	-2	0	64.3	44.0	7,322	+7.8%
Labour	4	4	0	+4	28.6	34.4	5,718	+18.6%
Liberal Democrats	0	0	0	0	0.0	6.9	1,152	-3.0%
UKIP	0	0	4	-4	0.0	5.3	876	-23.9%
Green	0	0	0	0	0.0	5.3	852	+0.5%
Shoreham Beach Residents' Association	1	0	0	0	7.1	4.4	726	+0.4%

=== By ward ===
Buckingham
Party	Candidate	Votes	%	±%
Conservative	Emma Evans	634	56.5	+3.0
Labour	Carol O'Neal	315	28.0	+14.5
Green	Jane Mott	105	9.3	+1.3
Liberal Democrats	Elisa Vaughan	67	6.0	+0.7
Majority		319	28.4	−5.5
Turnout		1,123	35.7	−4.8
Conservative hold		Swing	5.8% Con to Lab	

Churchill
Party	Candidate	Votes	%	±%
Conservative	Pat Beresford	444	44.9	−2.6
Labour	Christopher Allinson	270	27.3	+27.3
Liberal Democrats	Steve Creed	151	15.3	−1.0
UKIP	Gloria Eveleigh	117	11.8	−24.4
Majority		174	17.6	+6.3
Turnout		988	28.7	−10.0
Conservative hold		Swing	15% Con to Lab	

Cokeham
Party	Candidate	Votes	%	±%
Conservative	Paul Mansfield	575	52.6	+28.6
Labour	Michael Thornton	381	34.8	+17.8
UKIP	David Bamber	55	5.0	−29.5
Liberal Democrats	Stephen Male	51	5.0	−19.3
Green	Christopher Davis	28	2.6	+2.6
Majority		194	17.7	+17.7
Turnout		1,094	32.0	−6.4
Conservative gain from UKIP		Swing	29.1% UKIP to Con	

Eastbrook
Party	Candidate	Votes	%	±%
Labour	David Balfe	590	48.8	+27.6
Conservative	James Funnell	538	44.5	+9.8
Green	Patrick Ginnelly	40	3.3	−3.3
Liberal Democrats	Raj Dooraree	36	3.0	−8.2
Majority		52	4.3	+4.3
Turnout		1,209	34.9	−1.4
Labour gain from Conservative		Swing	8.9% Con to Lab	

Hillside
Party	Candidate	Votes	%	±%
Conservative	David Simmons	652	62.3	+20.6
Labour	Stephen Gilbert	290	27.7	+10.8
Green	Julian Shinn	69	6.6	+1.5
Liberal Democrats	Nilda Dooraree	33	3.2	−1.4
Majority		362	34.6	+24.6
Turnout		1,047	30.4	−7.0
Conservative hold		Swing	4.9% Lab to Con	

Manor
Party	Candidate	Votes	%	±%
Conservative	Carol Albury	687	59.4	+14.9
Labour	Douglas Bradley	245	21.2	+8.5
UKIP	Lionel Parsons	97	8.4	−25.4
Liberal Democrats	Peter Barnes	67	5.8	−3.2
Green	Margaret Rumble	58	5.0	+5.0
Majority		442	38.2	+27.5
Turnout		1,156	35.0	−5.9
Conservative hold		Swing	20.2% UKIP to Con	

Marine
Party	Candidate	Votes	%	±%
Shoreham Beach Residents Association	David Collins	726	52.7	-3.5
Labour	Melanie Jenner	340	24.7	+15.0
Green	Andrew Bradbury	250	18.2	+8.5
UKIP	Peter Harvey	55	4.0	−14.8
Majority		386	28.0	−9.5
Turnout		1,377	38.0	+1.3
Shoreham Beach Residents Association hold		Swing	9.3% SBRA to Lab	

Mash Barn
Party	Candidate	Votes	%	±%
Labour	Lee Cowan	535	49.0	+40.9
Conservative	Joe Pannell	309	28.3	+5.7
Liberal Democrats	Doris Martin	128	11.7	−13.1
UKIP	Amanda Jones	103	9.4	−35.2
Green	Peter Groves	15	1.4	+1.4
Majority		226	20.7	+20.7
Turnout		1,092	32.1	
Labour gain from UKIP		Swing	38.1% UKIP to Lab	

Peverel
Party	Candidate	Votes	%	±%
Conservative	Brian Boggis	562	57.2	+18.1
Labour	Sylvia Knight	250	25.5	+5.8
UKIP	David Lewis	81	8.2	−26.8
Liberal Democrats	Diane Male	81	8.2	+1.8
Majority		312	31.8	+27.7
Turnout		982	28.5	−6.3
Conservative hold		Swing	22.5% UKIP to Con	

Southlands
Party	Candidate	Votes	%	±%
Labour	Lavinia O'Connor	425	41.7	+18.5
Conservative	Tony Nicklen	414	40.7	+8.0
Liberal Democrats	Keith Humphrey	69	6.8	+1.7
Green	Leslie Groves	57	5.6	+1.0
UKIP	Jean Turner	52	5.1	−29.3
Majority		11	1.1	+1.1
Turnout		1,018	32.1	−4.5
Labour gain from UKIP		Swing	23.9% UKIP to Lab	

Southwick Green
Party	Candidate	Votes	%	±%
Conservative	Stephen Chipp	652	52.4	+7.2
Labour	Sophie Brown	468	37.6	+18.8
Liberal Democrats	Ross Dowsett	117	9.4	+2.6
Majority		184	14.8	−9.6
Turnout		1,244	35.7	−1.3
Conservative hold		Swing	5.8% Con to Lab	

St. Mary's
Party	Candidate	Votes	%	±%
Labour	Catherine Arnold	757	53.3	+30.7
Conservative	Colin Head	453	31.9	−5.2
Green	Lynn Finnigan	85	6.0	−6.7
Liberal Democrats	David Batchelor	79	5.6	−0.8
UKIP	Darren Compton	45	3.2	−17.9
Majority		304	21.4	+21.4
Turnout		1,420	37.9	+1.4
Labour gain from Conservative		Swing	18% Con to Lab	

St. Nicholas
Party	Candidate	Votes	%	±%
Conservative	Neil Parkin	662	47.4	−1.4
Labour	Adrienne Lowe	440	31.5	+16.2
Green	Louise Miller	145	10.4	−2.1
Liberal Democrats	Andrew Tinsley	113	8.1	+0.7
UKIP	Mike Henn	35	2.5	−13.5
Majority		222	15.9	−16.9
Turnout		1,398	44.7	−0.6
Conservative hold		Swing	8.8% Con to Lab	

Widewater
Party	Candidate	Votes	%	±%
Conservative	Andy McGregor	740	47.6	+13.1
Labour	Richard Aulton	412	26.5	+8.7
UKIP	Geoff Patmore	236	15.2	−24.2
Liberal Democrats	Sue Barnes	160	10.3	+2.0
Majority		328	21.1	+21.1
Turnout		1,553	33.0	−5.1
Conservative gain from UKIP		Swing	18.7% UKIP to Con	
