= Worthing Borough Council elections =

Local government elections in West Sussex, England

One third of Worthing Borough Council in Worthing, West Sussex, England is elected each year, followed by one year without election. Since the last boundary changes in 2004, 37 councillors are elected from 13 wards.

== Results ==
Composition of the council
Year	Conservative	Liberal Democrats (Note: Includes totals for the predecessors of the Liberal Democrats, the Liberal Party and SDP (both of which participated in the Alliance).)	Labour	Green	Reform	UKIP	Independents & Others	Council control after election
Local government reorganisation; council established (30 seats)
1973	17	0	1	–	–	–	12	Conservative
1976	26	0	1	0	–	–	3	Conservative
1979	16	9	0	0	–	–	5	Conservative
New ward boundaries (36 seats)
1983	24	12	0	0	–	–	0	Conservative
1984	24	12	0	0	–	–	0	Conservative
1986	22	14	0	0	–	–	0	Conservative
1987	24	12	0	0	–	–	0	Conservative
1988	26	10	0	0	–	–	0	Conservative
1990	27	9	0	0	–	–	0	Conservative
1991	24	12	0	0	–	–	0	Conservative
1992	22	14	0	0	–	–	0	Conservative
1994	17	19	0	0	–	0	0	Liberal Democrats
1995	13	23	0	0	–	0	0	Liberal Democrats
1996	11	25	0	0	–	0	0	Liberal Democrats
1998	15	21	0	0	–	0	0	Liberal Democrats
1999	20	16	0	0	–	0	0	Conservative
2000	20	16	0	0	–	0	0	Conservative
2002	17	19	0	0	–	0	0	Liberal Democrats
2003	18	18	0	0	–	0	0	No overall control
New ward boundaries (37 seats)
2004	26	11	0	0	–	0	0	Conservative
2006	23	14	0	0	–	0	0	Conservative
2007	24	12	0	0	–	0	1	Conservative
2008	24	13	0	0	–	0	0	Conservative
2010	25	12	0	0	–	0	0	Conservative
2011	25	11	0	0	–	0	1	Conservative
2012	24	12	0	0	–	0	1	Conservative
2014	27	7	0	1	–	1	1	Conservative
2015	30	4	0	1	–	1	1	Conservative
2016	32	2	0	1	–	2	0	Conservative
2018	29	2	5	0	–	1	0	Conservative
2019	23	3	10	0	–	1	0	Conservative
2021	19	3	15	0	0	0	0	Conservative
2022	13	1	23	0	0	0	0	Labour
2023	11	1	24	1	0	0	0	Labour
2024	9	0	26	2	0	0	0	Labour
2026	6	1	15	8	5	0	2	No overall control

== Borough result maps ==
2004 results map

2006 results map

2007 results map

2008 results map

2010 results map

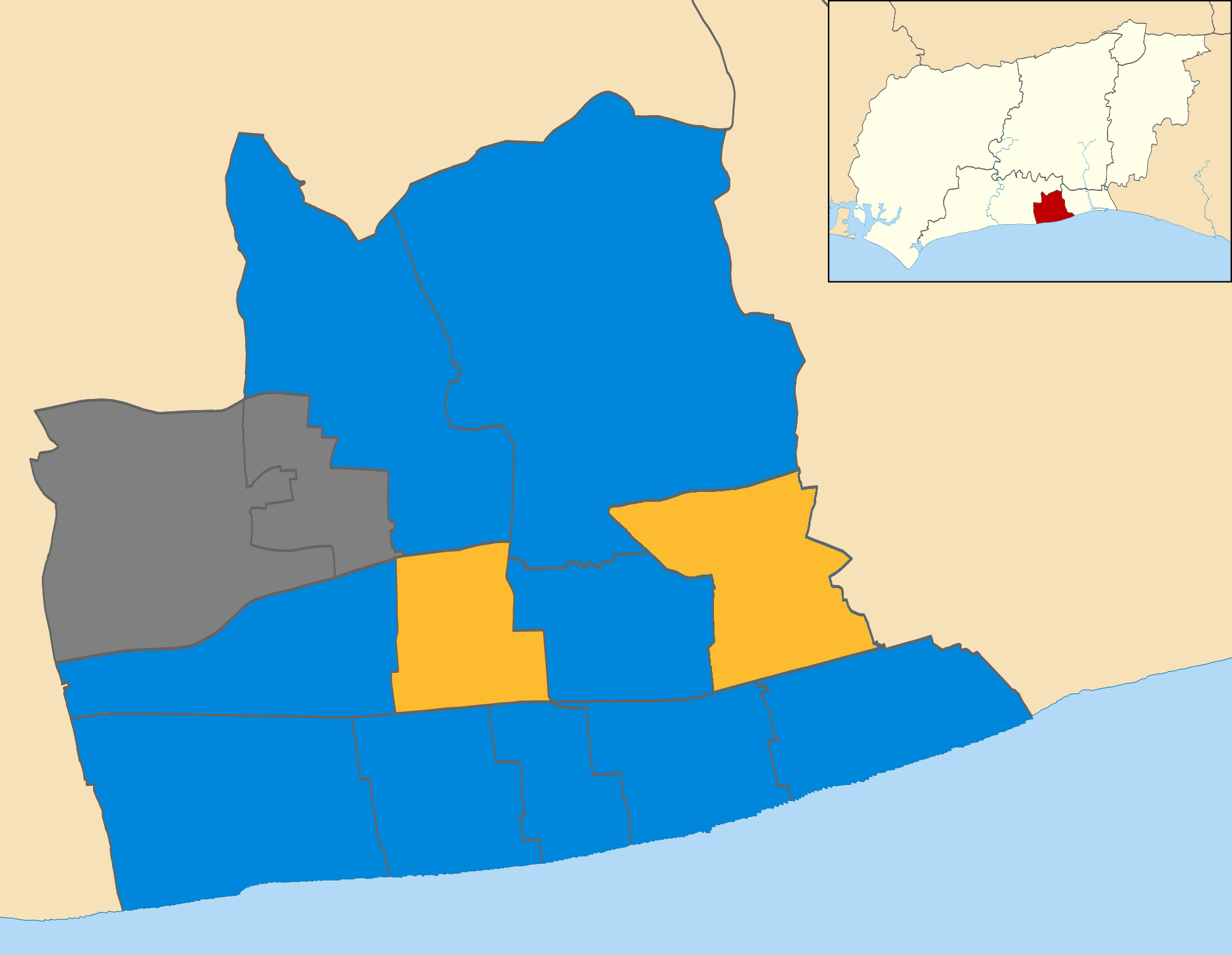
2011 results map

2012 results map

2014 results map

2015 results map

2016 results map

2018 results map

2019 results map

2021 results map

2022 results map

2023 results map

2024 results map

2026 results map

== Election apportionment diagrams ==
2019 Election apportionment diagram

2021 Election apportionment diagram

2022 Election apportionment diagram

2023 Election apportionment diagram

== By-election results ==
=== 2010-2014 ===
Goring by-election 2 May 2013
Party	Candidate	Votes	%	±%
Conservative	Mark Nolan	997	43.7	▼6.5
UKIP	Adrian Price	769	33.7	▲13.5
Labour	Janet Haden	195	8.5	▼6.5
Green	David Aherne	171	7.5	Steady
Liberal Democrats	Neil Campbell	149	6.5	▼0.6
Majority		228	10.0	
Turnout		2,281		
Conservative hold		Swing		

=== 2014-2018 ===
Castle by-election 7 August 2014
Party	Candidate	Votes	%	±%
UKIP	Charles James	568	36.9	▲7.0
Conservative	Alex Harman	485	31.5	▼0.7
Liberal Democrats	Nicholas Wiltshire	242	15.7	▼3.3
Labour	Jim Deen	197	12.8	▼2.1
Green	Stefan Sykes	49	3.2	▼0.8
Majority		83	5.4	
Turnout		1,541		
UKIP gain from Liberal Democrats		Swing		

Marine by-election 3 August 2017
Party	Candidate	Votes	%	±%
Labour	Rebecca Cooper	1,032	47.4	▲27.8
Conservative	Joseph Crouch	846	38.8	▼6.4
Liberal Democrats	Antony Brown	246	11.3	▲1.1
Green	Joanna Ponto	55	2.5	▼6.2
Majority		186	8.6	N/A
Turnout		2,181	32.1	▼0.56%
Labour gain from Conservative		Swing	17.6%	

=== 2018-2022 ===
Salvington by-election 12 December 2019
Party	Candidate	Votes	%	±%
Conservative	Richard Nowak	2,690	60.4	
Labour	Gill Poole	832	18.7	
Liberal Democrats	Emma Norton	928	20.9	
Majority		1762	39.6	
Turnout		4,450	61.7	
Conservative hold		Swing		

Marine by-election 2 December 2021
Party	Candidate	Votes	%	±%
Labour	Vicki Wells	1,239	50.2	+3.2
Conservative	Syed Ahmed	972	39.4	−3.3
Green	Sonya Mallin	145	5.9	+0.1
Liberal Democrats	Emma Norton	112	4.5	+0.0
Majority		267	10.8	
Turnout		2,468		
Labour gain from Conservative		Swing		

=== 2022-2026 ===
Marine by-election 19 September 2024
Party	Candidate	Votes	%	±%
Conservative	Thomas Taylor	865	40.7	+9.6
Labour	Mary Mernagh	781	36.8	−19.2
Reform	Lionel Harman	228	10.7	+10.7
Green	Jimi Taylor	138	6.5	−0.9
Liberal Democrats	Nick Wiltshire	113	5.3	−0.3
Majority		84	4.0	
Turnout		2,125		
Conservative gain from Labour		Swing		

Heene by-election 10 October 2024
Party	Candidate	Votes	%	±%
Conservative	Luke Houghton	742	42.0	+15.8
Labour	Anthony Squires	704	39.9	−16.4
Green	Kate Thornton	186	10.5	+0.0
Liberal Democrats	Trudi Starling	133	7.5	+0.6
Majority		38	2.2	
Turnout		1,765		
Conservative gain from Labour		Swing		
