= 2014 Worthing Borough Council election =

2014 UK local government election

| ← 2012 | 22 May 2014 | 2015 → |

13 out of 37 seats to Worthing Borough Council 19 seats needed for a majority

| | First party | Second party | Third party |
|---|---|---|---|
| Party | Conservative | Liberal Democrats | UKIP |
| Last election | 24 seats, 41.4% | 12 seats, 24.6% | 0 seats, 16.9% |
| Seats won | 10 | 1 | 1 |
| Seats after | 27 | 7 | 1 |
| Seat change | ▲3 | ▼5 | ▲1 |
| Popular vote | 10,365 | 3,600 | 8,277 |
| Percentage | 36.2% | 12.6% | 28.9% |
| Swing | ▼5.2% | ▼12.0% | ▲12.0% |
| | Fourth party | Fifth party |
| Party | Green | Labour |
| Last election | 0 seats, 1.8% | 0 seats, 15.2% |
| Seats won | 1 | 0 |
| Seats after | 1 | 0 |
| Seat change | ▲1 | Steady |
| Popular vote | 3,049 | 3,348 |
| Percentage | 10.6% | 11.7% |
| Swing | ▲8.8% | ▼3.5% |
- Map showing the election results. Each ward had one seat up for election.
Council control before election
Conservative
Council control after election
Conservative

The 2014 Worthing Borough Council election took place on 22 May 2014 to elect members of Worthing Borough Council in West Sussex, England. The election took place on the same day as elections to the European Parliament, and saw one third of the council up for election. The Conservative Party retained overall control of the council, gaining four seats, but losing one to the UK Independence Party. The Liberal Democrats suffered five losses, including one to the Green Party, who gained their first elected seat on the Council.

== Election result ==
Worthing local election result 2014
| Party | Seats | Gains | Losses | Net gain/loss | Seats % | Votes % | Votes | +/− |
|---|---|---|---|---|---|---|---|---|
| Conservative | 10 | 4 | 1 | +3 | 76.9 | 36.2 | 10,365 | -10.2 |
| UKIP | 1 | 1 | 0 | +1 | 7.7 | 28.9 | 8,277 | +21.5 |
| Liberal Democrats | 1 | 0 | 5 | -5 | 7.7 | 12.6 | 3,600 | -27.3 |
| Labour | 0 | 0 | 0 | 0 | 0.0 | 11.7 | 3,348 | +5.4 |
| Green | 1 | 1 | 0 | +1 | 7.7 | 10.6 | 3,049 | +10.6 |

=== Ward results ===
Broadwater
| Party | Candidate | Votes | % | ±% |
|---|---|---|---|---|
| Conservative | Victoria Vaughan | 754 | 34.2 | −7.1 |
| UKIP | Elise Mason | 691 | 31.3 | +23.9 |
| Labour | John Turley | 288 | 13.0 | +2.6 |
| Liberal Democrats | John Apsey | 272 | 12.3 | −28.1 |
| Green | Richard Battson | 202 | 9.2 | +9.2 |
| Majority | | 63 | 2.9 | +2.0 |
| Turnout | | 2,207 | 32.4 | −30.6 |
| Conservative hold | | Swing | 15.5% Con to UKIP | |

Castle
| Party | Candidate | Votes | % | ±% |
|---|---|---|---|---|
| Conservative | Luke Proudfoot | 702 | 32.2 | −8.5 |
| UKIP | Dave Shipley | 653 | 29.9 | +29.9 |
| Liberal Democrats | Nick Wiltshire | 414 | 18.9 | −39.2 |
| Labour | Jim Deen | 324 | 14.9 | +14.9 |
| Green | Daniel Aherne | 88 | 4.0 | +4.0 |
| Majority | | 49 | 2.2 | +2.2 |
| Turnout | | 2,181 | 35.1 | −24.9 |
| Conservative gain from Liberal Democrats | | Swing | 15.4% LD to Con | |

Central
| Party | Candidate | Votes | % | ±% |
|---|---|---|---|---|
| Green | James Doyle | 610 | 26.3 | +26.3 |
| Conservative | Alex Harman | 601 | 25.9 | −10.5 |
| UKIP | Malcolm Milne | 559 | 24.1 | +17.6 |
| Labour | Peter Barnes | 362 | 15.6 | +4.1 |
| Liberal Democrats | Chris Allen | 188 | 8.1 | −34.8 |
| Majority | | 9 | 0.4 | +0.4 |
| Turnout | | 2,320 | 31.8 | −22.2 |
| Green gain from Liberal Democrats | | Swing | 30.6% LD to Green | |

Durrington
| Party | Candidate | Votes | % | ±% |
|---|---|---|---|---|
| UKIP | Susan Jelliss | 526 | 33.6 | +23.1 |
| Conservative | Steve Waight | 494 | 31.5 | −13.7 |
| Liberal Democrats | Jackie Cranefield | 345 | 22.0 | −21.7 |
| Labour | Guy Chadwick | 152 | 9.7 | +9.7 |
| Green | Fiona Ramasami | 50 | 3.2 | +3.2 |
| Majority | | 32 | 2.0 | +2.0 |
| Turnout | | 1,567 | 34.7 | −30.3 |
| UKIP gain from Conservative | | Swing | 18.4% Con to UKIP | |

Gaisford
| Party | Candidate | Votes | % | ±% |
|---|---|---|---|---|
| Conservative | Kevin Jenkins | 874 | 37.4 | −4.8 |
| UKIP | John Dawkins | 537 | 22.9 | +15.5 |
| Green | William Morris | 317 | 15.8 | +15.8 |
| Labour | Joe Thornton | 312 | 13.3 | +2.7 |
| Liberal Democrats | Dimitri Seirlis | 300 | 12.8 | −29.4 |
| Majority | | 337 | 14.4 | +14.4 |
| Turnout | | 2,340 | 34.3 | −29.7 |
| Conservative gain from Liberal Democrats | | Swing | 12.3% LD to Con | |

Goring
| Party | Candidate | Votes | % | ±% |
|---|---|---|---|---|
| Conservative | Mark Nolan | 1,435 | 48.5 | −8.1 |
| UKIP | Trevor England | 817 | 27.6 | +18.5 |
| Labour | Margaret Harris | 305 | 10.3 | −1.3 |
| Green | David Aherne | 217 | 7.3 | +7.3 |
| Liberal Democrats | Trudi Starling | 186 | 6.3 | −15.7 |
| Majority | | 618 | 20.8 | −13.9 |
| Turnout | | 2,960 | 43.8 | −28.2 |
| Conservative hold | | Swing | 13.3% Con to UKIP | |

Heene
| Party | Candidate | Votes | % | ±% |
|---|---|---|---|---|
| Conservative | Diane Guest | 714 | 34.0 | −12.5 |
| Green | Stefan Sykes | 507 | 24.2 | +24.2 |
| UKIP | Rick Setford | 498 | 23.7 | +23.7 |
| Labour | Jill Guest | 222 | 10.6 | −4.5 |
| Liberal Democrats | Michael Finch | 158 | 7.5 | −30.3 |
| Majority | | 207 | 9.9 | +1.3 |
| Turnout | | 2,099 | 32.8 | −23.2 |
| Conservative hold | | Swing | 18.4% Con to Green | |

Marine
| Party | Candidate | Votes | % | ±% |
|---|---|---|---|---|
| Conservative | Edward Crouch | 1,114 | 43.6 | +15.4 |
| UKIP | Charles James | 692 | 27.1 | +20.5 |
| Labour | Alex Wagstaff | 298 | 11.7 | +11.7 |
| Green | Melanie Muir | 264 | 10.3 | +10.3 |
| Liberal Democrats | Pat Izod | 189 | 7.4 | −10.9 |
| Majority | | 422 | 16.5 | |
| Turnout | | 2,557 | 38.9 | −26.1 |
| Conservative hold | | Swing | 2.6% Con to UKIP | |

Northbrook
| Party | Candidate | Votes | % | ±% |
|---|---|---|---|---|
| Conservative | Sean McDonald | 355 | 35.8 | −9.8 |
| UKIP | Mike Jelliss | 328 | 33.1 | +33.1 |
| Liberal Democrats | Diane Jones | 169 | 17.0 | −36.6 |
| Labour | Philip Dufty | 86 | 8.7 | +8.7 |
| Green | Katherine Kohl | 54 | 5.4 | +5.4 |
| Majority | | 27 | 2.7 | +2.7 |
| Turnout | | 992 | 27.9 | −25.1 |
| Conservative gain from Liberal Democrats | | Swing | 21.5% Con to UKIP | |

Offington
| Party | Candidate | Votes | % | ±% |
|---|---|---|---|---|
| Conservative | Louise Murphy | 1,240 | 47.9 | −8.3 |
| UKIP | Toby Brothers | 798 | 30.8 | +20.1 |
| Liberal Democrats | Linda Williams | 194 | 7.5 | −16.7 |
| Labour | Ann Saunders | 191 | 7.4 | −0.9 |
| Green | Stephen Nethercott-Cable | 164 | 6.3 | +6.3 |
| Majority | | 442 | 17.1 | −14.0 |
| Turnout | | 2,587 | 40.8 | −31.2 |
| Conservative hold | | Swing | 14.2% Con to UKIP | |

Salvington
| Party | Candidate | Votes | % | ±% |
|---|---|---|---|---|
| Conservative | Heather Mercer | 1,011 | 39.0 | −11.6 |
| UKIP | Pauline James | 988 | 38.2 | +25.5 |
| Labour | David Lace | 236 | 9.1 | +9.1 |
| Green | Julia Owen | 181 | 7.0 | +7.0 |
| Liberal Democrats | Val Capon | 173 | 6.9 | −28.9 |
| Majority | | 23 | 0.9 | −13.9 |
| Turnout | | 2,589 | 36.4 | −27.6 |
| Conservative hold | | Swing | 18.6% Con to UKIP | |

Selden
| Party | Candidate | Votes | % | ±% |
|---|---|---|---|---|
| Conservative | Callum Buxton | 601 | 30.4 | −5.4 |
| UKIP | John Harwood | 526 | 26.6 | +19.5 |
| Labour | Mike Barrett | 354 | 17.9 | +5.5 |
| Liberal Democrats | Yvonne Leonard | 298 | 15.1 | −30.6 |
| Green | Valerie Ellis | 199 | 10.1 | +10.1 |
| Majority | | 75 | 3.8 | +3.8 |
| Turnout | | 1,978 | 31.4 | −28.6 |
| Conservative gain from Liberal Democrats | | Swing | | |

Tarring
| Party | Candidate | Votes | % | ±% |
|---|---|---|---|---|
| Liberal Democrats | Bob Smytherman | 714 | 31.6 | −20.9 |
| UKIP | Adrian Price | 664 | 29.4 | +18.1 |
| Conservative | David Messer | 470 | 20.8 | −14.5 |
| Labour | Michelle Forsyth | 218 | 9.6 | +9.6 |
| Green | Ross Johnson | 196 | 8.7 | +8.7 |
| Majority | | 50 | 2.2 | −15.0 |
| Turnout | | 2,262 | 34.9 | −29.1 |
| Liberal Democrats hold | | Swing | 19.5% LD to UKIP | |
