= Victoria Taylor =

Victoria Taylor may refer to:

- Victoria Addison Taylor, second wife of Liberian president Charles Taylor
- Victoria Taylor (Reddit), Reddit employee whose firing caused controversy
- Victoria Taylor (politician), British politician

== See also ==
- Vicki Lee Taylor
