= 2021 Worthing Borough Council election =

2021 UK local government election

← 2019	6 May 2021	2022 →

13 of the 37 seats to Worthing Borough Council 19 seats needed for a majority

	First party	Second party	Third party
Party	Conservative	Labour	Liberal Democrats
Last election	23 seats, 36.5%	10 seats, 31.0%	3 seats, 14.8%
Seats won	6	6	1
Seats after	19	15	3
Seat change	▼4	▲5	Steady
Popular vote	13,979	10,797	3,307
Percentage	44.8%	34.6%	10.8%
Swing	▲8.3%	▲3.6%	▼4.0%
	Fourth party	Fifth party
Party	Green	UKIP
Last election	0 seats, 9.9%	1 seat, 7.2%
Seats won	0	0
Seats after	0	0
Seat change	Steady	▼1
Popular vote	2,990	0
Percentage	9.6%	0.0%
Swing	▼0.3%	▼7.2%
- Map showing the election results. Each ward had one seat up for election.
Council control before election
Conservative
Council control after election
Conservative

The 2021 Worthing Borough Council election took place on 6 May 2021 to elect members of Worthing Borough Council, on the same day as other UK local elections. This election was originally scheduled to take place on 7 May 2020, but was delayed a year due to the COVID-19 pandemic; 2021 was originally scheduled to be an off-year for Worthing Borough Council elections. A third of the council was up for election, a total of 13 councillors. Candidates elected in 2016 had their term expire at this election.

The Conservative Party was seeking to maintain its majority, which it had held in the town since 2004. In the 2018 election, the Labour Party emerged as the largest opposition party in Worthing; this election was the first since the incorporation of the borough council in 1974 in which it was technically possible for Labour to win a majority.

The Labour Party and The Conservative Party won 6 seats each in this election, with the Liberal Democrats winning 1. Labour gained 5 seats and held 1; a net gain of 5 seats. The Conservatives lost 5 seats to Labour, but gained one from UKIP in Northbrook Ward, and held 5; a net loss of 4 seats. The Liberal Democrats held on to their seat in Tarring Ward.

The Conservative majority was cut to 1. With a Conservative councillor then becoming an independent and a loss in a by-election, it would become a minority administration before the 2022 elections.

== Results summary ==
2021 Worthing Borough Council election
Party	This election			Full council			This election		
Party	Seats	Net	Seats %	Other	Total	Total %	Votes	Votes %	+/−
Conservative	6	▼4	46.2	13	19	51.4	13,979	44.8	+8.3
Labour	6	▲5	46.2	9	15	40.5	10,797	34.6	+3.6
Liberal Democrats	1	Steady	7.7	2	3	8.1	3,378	10.8	-4.0
Green	0	Steady	0.0	0	0	0.0	2,990	9.6	-0.3
Libertarian	0	Steady	0.0	0	0	0.0	46	0.1	N/A
UKIP	0	▼1	0.0	0	0	0.0	N/A	N/A	N/A

== Ward results ==
=== Broadwater ===
Broadwater
Party	Candidate	Votes	%	±%
Labour	Cathy Glynn-Davies	1,139	45.3	+0.3
Conservative	Paisley Thomson	1004	39.9	+8.6
Green	Richard Battson	192	7.6	−4.8
Liberal Democrats	John Apsey	165	6.6	−4.7
Majority		135	5.4	
Rejected ballots		16	0.6	
Turnout			36.7 (Note: Turnout figures taken from directly from website. As such, it is unsure whether it includes rejected ballots or not. All vote share percentages are calculated including rejected ballots.)	
Labour gain from Conservative		Swing		

=== Castle ===
Castle
Party	Candidate	Votes	%	±%
Conservative	Steve Wills	956	41.9	+6.5
Labour	Ibsha Choudhury	880	38.5	+19.7
Liberal Democrats	Nick Wiltshire	253	11.1	−7.3
Green	Julie Dawe	182	8.0	−3.5
Majority		76	3.4	
Rejected ballots		13	0.6	
Turnout			32.5	
Conservative hold		Swing		

=== Central ===
Central
Party	Candidate	Votes	%	±%
Labour	Rosey Whorlow	1,127	44.2	−0.7
Conservative	Alex Harman	763	29.9	+5.0
Green	Jo Paul	455	17.8	−2.7
Liberal Democrats	Christine Brown	176	6.9	−2.8
Majority		364	14.3	
Rejected ballots		29	1.1	
Turnout			33.0	
Labour gain from Conservative		Swing		

=== Durrington ===
Durrington
Party	Candidate	Votes	%	±%
Conservative	Dan Coxhill	783	55.2	−1.8
Labour	Graham McKnight	310	21.9	+0.6
Liberal Democrats	Emma Norton	210	14.8	−6.5
Green	James Darrall	103	7.3	N/A
Majority		473	33.3	
Rejected ballots		12	0.8	
Turnout			31.2	
Conservative hold		Swing		

This ward had no election in 2019, so changes are shown from 2018.

=== Gaisford ===
Gaisford
Party	Candidate	Votes	%	±%
Labour	John Turley	1,235	42.3	−4.7
Conservative	Val Turner	1114	38.1	+1.3
Green	Stephen Carleysmith	284	9.7	N/A
Liberal Democrats	Caroline Gentry	261	8.9	−7.3
Majority		121	4.2	
Rejected ballots		28	1.0	
Turnout			41.0	
Labour gain from Conservative		Swing		

=== Goring ===
Goring
Party	Candidate	Votes	%	±%
Conservative	Steve Waight	1,785	60.9	+11.8
Labour	Jane Cropper	601	20.5	+7.4
Green	Sharon Huls	279	9.5	−3.1
Liberal Democrats	Robin Rogers	248	8.5	−2.7
Majority		1184	40.4	
Rejected ballots		20	0.7	
Turnout			42.4	
Conservative hold		Swing		

=== Heene ===
Heene
Party	Candidate	Votes	%	±%
Labour	Emma Taylor	1,091	43.2	+4.0
Conservative	Paul High	924	36.6	+2.3
Green	Ian Davey	347	13.7	+1.2
Liberal Democrats	Cyril Cannings	130	5.1	−2.3
Majority		167	6.6	
Rejected ballots		33	1.3	
Turnout			37.8	
Labour gain from Conservative		Swing		

=== Marine ===
Marine
Party	Candidate	Votes	%	±%
Labour	Beccy Cooper	1,456	46.6	+14.0
Conservative	Gavin Poole	1,324	42.4	+1.4
Green	Trevor Hopkins	181	5.8	−3.8
Liberal Democrats	Antony Brown	140	4.5	−3.9
Majority		132	4.2	
Rejected ballots		23	0.7	
Turnout			47.0	
Labour hold		Swing		

=== Northbrook ===
Northbrook
Party	Candidate	Votes	%	±%
Conservative	Russ Cochran	647	50.5	−0.6
Labour	Ingrid Allan	378	29.5	+2.0
Liberal Democrats	Keith Sunderland	130	10.2	−3.5
Green	Joe Pearce	113	8.8	N/A
Majority		269	21.0	
Rejected ballots		12	0.9	
Turnout			25.2	
Conservative gain from UKIP		Swing		

This ward had no election in 2019, so changes are shown from 2018.

=== Offington ===
Offington
Party	Candidate	Votes	%	±%
Conservative	Elizabeth Sparkes	1,693	64.7	+11.5
Labour	Helen Abrahams	421	16.1	+1.7
Green	Sonya Mallin	243	9.3	N/A
Liberal Democrats	Iona Harte	235	9.0	−11.0
Majority		1272	48.6	
Rejected ballots		23	0.9	
Turnout			40.0	
Conservative hold		Swing		

=== Salvington ===
Salvington
Party	Candidate	Votes	%	±%
Conservative	Richard Nowak	1,508	59.0	+14.4
Labour	Lysanne Skinner	440	17.2	+3.5
Liberal Democrats	Jackie Cranefield	372	14.5	+2.2
Green	Stephen Rhodes	220	8.6	−2.0
Majority		1068	41.8	
Rejected ballots		18	0.7	
Turnout			35.6	
Conservative hold		Swing		

=== Selden ===
Selden
Party	Candidate	Votes	%	±%
Labour	Jon Roser	1,115	46.4	−1.6
Conservative	Sarah Blake	848	35.3	+4.9
Green	Melanie Ling	226	9.4	−3.2
Liberal Democrats	Yvonne Leonard	138	5.7	−3.2
Majority		267	11.1	
Rejected ballots		77	3.2	
Turnout			37.9	
Labour gain from Conservative		Swing		

=== Tarring ===
Tarring
Party	Candidate	Votes	%	±%
Liberal Democrats	Hazel Thorpe	920	38.5	−3.8
Conservative	John Salisbury	630	26.4	+9.1
Labour	Pauline Fraser	604	25.3	+3.0
Green	Constantine De Goguel	165	6.9	−0.5
Libertarian	Marco Di Paola	46	1.9	N/A
Majority		290	12.1	
Rejected ballots		22	1.0	
Turnout			37.1	
Liberal Democrats hold		Swing		

== By-elections ==
=== Marine ===
Marine: 2 December 2021
Party	Candidate	Votes	%	±%
Labour	Vicki Wells	1,239	50.2	+3.2
Conservative	Syed Ahmed	972	39.4	−3.3
Green	Sonya Mallin	145	5.9	±0.0
Liberal Democrats	Emma Norton	112	4.5	±0.0
Majority		267	10.8	
Turnout		2,468	37.4	
Labour gain from Conservative		Swing	▲3.2	
