= 2002 Worthing Borough Council election =

Local government election

← 2000	2 May 2002	2003 →

12 out of 36 seats to Worthing Borough Council 19 seats needed for a majority

	First party	Second party
Party	Liberal Democrats	Conservative
Last election	16 seats	20 seats
Seats before	16	20
Seats won	7	5
Seats after	19	17
Seat change	▲3	▼3
Popular vote	10,387	10,621
Percentage	43.9%	44.9%
Council control before election
Conservative
Council control after election
Liberal Democrats

The 2002 Worthing Borough Council election took place on 2 May 2002 to elect members of Worthing Borough Council in West Sussex, England. One third of the council was up for election and the Liberal Democrats gained overall control of the council from the Conservative Party. Overall turnout was 30.67%.

After the previous election in 2000 the Conservatives had controlled the council with 20 seats compared to the Liberal Democrats 16. 12 seats were up for election in 2002 with the Liberal Democrats needing to gain 2 seats to make Worthing a hung council. Issues in the election included litter, the introduction of palm trees on the seafront and a recent 10.3% increase in council tax.

The results saw the Liberal Democrats make 3 gains from the Conservatives to take control. They gained all three of the seats they had been targeting in Castle, Gaisford and Selden wards. The Conservatives put their defeat down to a proposed Asda at Worthing College and on the recent increase in council tax which they blamed on the national government. The Liberal Democrats pledged to work for a "clean and safe Worthing". Following the election the Conservative mayor-elect, John Livermore, stepped down, refusing to serve as mayor with the Liberal Democrats in control of the council.

After the election, the composition of the council was:

- Liberal Democrat 19
- Conservative 17

== Election result ==
Worthing local election result 2002
Party	Seats	Gains	Losses	Net gain/loss	Seats %	Votes %	Votes	+/−
Liberal Democrats	7	3	0	+3	58.3	43.9	10,387	
Conservative	5	0	3	-3	41.7	44.9	10,621	
Labour	0	0	0	0	0	7.6	1,804	
Green	0	0	0	0	0	3.5	825	

== Ward results ==
Broadwater
Party	Candidate	Votes	%	±%
Liberal Democrats	Eric Mardell	1,148	68.8	
Conservative	Jack Saheid	372	22.3	
Labour	Ann Saunders	148	8.9	
Majority		776	46.5	
Turnout		1,668	25.8	
Liberal Democrats hold		Swing		

Castle
Party	Candidate	Votes	%	±%
Liberal Democrats	Maria Moynan	966	51.0	
Conservative	Mark O'Keeffe	633	33.4	
Labour	Peter Barnes	238	12.6	
Green	Derek Colkett	56	3.0	
Majority		333	17.6	
Turnout		1,893	31.7	
Liberal Democrats gain from Conservative		Swing		

Central
Party	Candidate	Votes	%	±%
Liberal Democrats	Janet Goldsbrough-Jones	903	58.7	
Conservative	Martin Coppard	445	28.9	
Labour	Brian Gill	191	12.4	
Majority		458	29.8	
Turnout		1,539	26.5	
Liberal Democrats hold		Swing		

Durrington
Party	Candidate	Votes	%	±%
Liberal Democrats	Christine Allen	1,470	64.8	
Conservative	Alan Whiteley	659	29.0	
Green	John Dwyer	141	6.2	
Majority		811	35.8	
Turnout		2,270	30.1	
Liberal Democrats hold		Swing		

Gaisford
Party	Candidate	Votes	%	±%
Liberal Democrats	Donald Lissenburg	962	49.1	
Conservative	Brian Turner	740	37.8	
Labour	Joy Hurcombe	169	8.6	
Green	Marie Hillcoat	89	4.5	
Majority		222	11.3	
Turnout		1,960	30.3	
Liberal Democrats gain from Conservative		Swing		

Goring
Party	Candidate	Votes	%	±%
Conservative	David Marchant	1,800	71.3	
Liberal Democrats	Nick Rodgers	724	28.7	
Majority		1,076	42.6	
Turnout		2,524	37.6	
Conservative hold		Swing		

Heene
Party	Candidate	Votes	%	±%
Conservative	John Livermore	989	58.3	
Liberal Democrats	Jenny Bennett	557	32.9	
Green	Heather Rogers	149	8.8	
Majority		432	25.4	
Turnout		1,695	27.3	
Conservative hold		Swing		

Marine
Party	Candidate	Votes	%	±%
Conservative	Francis Wingate	1,235	60.7	
Liberal Democrats	Brian Stephenson	388	19.1	
Labour	Barrie Slater	230	11.3	
Green	Lucie Colkett	182	8.9	
Majority		847	41.6	
Turnout		2,035	31.7	
Conservative hold		Swing		

Offington
Party	Candidate	Votes	%	±%
Conservative	Graham Fabes	1,404	64.6	
Liberal Democrats	Paul Daniels	502	23.1	
Labour	John Gardiner	153	7.0	
Green	Rosemary Hook	115	5.3	
Majority		902	41.5	
Turnout		2,174	34.7	
Conservative hold		Swing		

Salvington
Party	Candidate	Votes	%	±%
Conservative	Valerie Sutton	1,176	60.6	
Liberal Democrats	Liz Mardell	550	28.4	
Labour	Hazel Rennie	214	11.0	
Majority		626	32.2	
Turnout		1,940	29.8	
Conservative hold		Swing		

Selden
Party	Candidate	Votes	%	±%
Liberal Democrats	James Doyle	920	44.8	
Conservative	Paul High	733	35.7	
Labour	John Turley	309	15.0	
Green	Dave Yates	93	4.5	
Majority		187	9.1	
Turnout		2,055	33.5	
Liberal Democrats gain from Conservative		Swing		

Tarring
Party	Candidate	Votes	%	±%
Liberal Democrats	Bob Smytherman	1,297	68.8	
Conservative	Mary Harding	435	23.1	
Labour	Ian Sandell	152	8.1	
Majority		862	45.7	
Turnout		1,884	28.9	
Liberal Democrats hold		Swing		
