= 2007 Worthing Borough Council election =

2007 UK local government election

← 2006	3 May 2007	2008 →

12 out of 37 seats to Worthing Borough Council 19 seats needed for a majority

	First party	Second party	Third party
Party	Conservative	Liberal Democrats	UKIP
Last election	23 seats, 52.2%	14 seats, 38.7%	0 seats, 2.6%
Seats won	9	3	0
Seats after	24	12	0
Seat change	▲1	▼2	Steady
Popular vote	14,189	8,829	1,478
Percentage	52.4%	32.6%	5.5%
Swing	▲0.2%	▼6.1%	▲2.9%
- Map of the results of the 2007 Worthing council election. Conservatives in blue and Liberal Democrats in yellow. Wards in grey were not contested in 2007.
Council control before election
Conservative
Council control after election
Conservative

The 2007 Worthing Borough Council election took place on 3 May 2007 to elect members of Worthing Borough Council in West Sussex, England. One third of the council was up for election and the Conservative Party stayed in overall control of the council.

Candidates from the Conservatives, Liberal Democrats, Green Party, Labour and the United Kingdom Independence Party stood in the election. There was also one candidate, Dawn Smith, standing as a "Stop Durrington's Overdevelopment - Save Titnore's Trees" candidate as a protest against plans to build 875 houses near Worthing.

The Liberal Democrats had been hoping to gain three seats, but the results saw the Conservatives gain one seat from the Liberal Democrats to strengthen their majority on the council. The Liberal Democrat defeat came by 12 votes in Selden ward where their candidate James Doyle was upset over the Conservatives using the description "Conservative, Stop Hospital Cuts" on the ballot paper. Conservative Kevin Skepper retained his seat in Broadwater, which he had previously won as a Liberal Democrat before defecting to the Conservatives. This was the first time since 1975 that a Conservative had won in Broadwater. Meanwhile, in Castle ward the Liberal Democrats held both the seats in Castle ward after 3 recounts. Overall voter turnout in the election was 35.41%.

After the election, the composition of the council was:

- Conservative 24
- Liberal Democrat 12
- Independent 1

== Election result ==
Worthing local election result 2007
Party	Seats	Gains	Losses	Net gain/loss	Seats %	Votes %	Votes	+/−
Conservative	9	1	0	+1	75.0	52.4	14,189	+0.2%
Liberal Democrats	3	0	1	-1	25.0	32.6	8,829	-6.1%
UKIP	0	0	0	0	0	5.5	1,478	+2.9%
Labour	0	0	0	0	0	4.7	1,266	+2.8%
Green	0	0	0	0	0	4.3	1,156	-0.3%
Stop! Durrington's Overdevelopment - Save Titnores' Trees	0	0	0	0	0	0.6	174	+0.6%

== Ward results ==
Broadwater
Party	Candidate	Votes	%	±%
Conservative	Kevin Skepper	1,062	49.6	+14.1
Liberal Democrats	Gary Riding	941	44.0	−8.2
Labour	John Turley	136	6.4	+6.4
Majority		121	5.6	
Turnout		2,139	33.0	−0.3
Conservative hold		Swing		

Castle (2)
Party	Candidate	Votes	%	±%
Liberal Democrats	Robin Rogers	1,025		
Liberal Democrats	David Potter	952		
Conservative	Bill Capper	944		
Conservative	Ruth White	924		
Green	Julian Warrick	251		
UKIP	Chris Chatfield	204		
Turnout		4,300	35.5	+0.8
Liberal Democrats hold		Swing		
Liberal Democrats hold		Swing		

Central
Party	Candidate	Votes	%	±%
Conservative	Clive Roberts	874	42.7	+1.1
Liberal Democrats	Janet Goldsbrough-Jones	630	30.8	−7.0
Green	James Pearson	263	12.9	+1.2
Labour	Tony Smith	180	8.8	+0.0
UKIP	Christopher Woodward	99	4.8	+4.8
Majority		244	11.9	+8.1
Turnout		2,046	31.5	+1.5
Conservative hold		Swing		

Gaisford
Party	Candidate	Votes	%	±%
Conservative	Bryan Turner	1,085	47.4	+5.4
Liberal Democrats	Andrew Muggeridge	844	36.9	−7.6
Green	Marie Hillcoat	193	8.4	−5.1
Labour	Tori Finney	168	7.3	+7.3
Majority		241	10.5	
Turnout		2,290	35.0	+1.7
Conservative hold		Swing		

Goring
Party	Candidate	Votes	%	±%
Conservative	Ann Sayers	1,817	62.9	−3.4
Liberal Democrats	Merlin Jones	410	14.2	−5.8
UKIP	Richard Bater	323	11.2	−2.5
Stop! Durrington's Overdevelopment - Save Titnores' Trees	Dawn Smith	174	6.0	+6.0
Labour	Janet Haden	165	5.7	+5.7
Majority		1,407	48.7	+2.4
Turnout		2,889	43.0	+1.8
Conservative hold		Swing		

Heene
Party	Candidate	Votes	%	±%
Conservative	John Livermore	1,003	53.6	−8.4
Liberal Democrats	Alan Jones	446	23.9	−14.1
Green	Derek Colkett	248	13.3	+13.3
UKIP	Stuart Field	173	9.3	+9.3
Majority		557	29.7	+5.7
Turnout		1,870	31.0	+0.4
Conservative hold		Swing		

Marine
Party	Candidate	Votes	%	±%
Conservative	Keith Mercer	1,511	63.4	+3.4
Liberal Democrats	Susan Withnell	344	14.4	−1.0
Green	Sam Colkett	201	8.4	−2.5
UKIP	Phil Ruddock	171	7.2	+0.5
Labour	Barrie Slater	155	6.5	−0.5
Majority		1,167	49.0	+4.4
Turnout		2,382	36.7	−1.6
Conservative hold		Swing		

Offington
Party	Candidate	Votes	%	±%
Conservative	Graham Fabes	1,845	77.2	+2.5
Liberal Democrats	Norah Fisher	425	17.8	−7.5
Labour	Hazel Rennie	121	5.1	+5.1
Majority		1,420	59.4	+10.0
Turnout		2,391	39.0	−0.1
Conservative hold		Swing		

Salvington
Party	Candidate	Votes	%	±%
Conservative	Noel Atkins	1,530	61.3	−9.5
Liberal Democrats	Michael Cranefield	603	24.1	−5.1
UKIP	Ron Brooks	364	14.6	+14.6
Majority		527	37.2	−4.4
Turnout		2,497	35.0	+1.8
Conservative hold		Swing		

Selden
Party	Candidate	Votes	%	±%
Conservative	Roger Oakley	962	45.2	−1.3
Liberal Democrats	James Doyle	950	44.6	−8.9
Labour	Ann Saunders	216	10.2	+10.2
Majority		12	0.6	
Turnout		2,128	36.0	+2.9
Conservative gain from Liberal Democrats		Swing		

Tarring
Party	Candidate	Votes	%	±%
Liberal Democrats	Hazel Thorpe	1,259	58.3	+4.1
Conservative	John Rose	632	29.3	+0.2
UKIP	Martin McGinlay	144	6.7	−1.8
Labour	Sid Wells	125	5.8	−2.4
Majority		627	29.0	+3.9
Turnout		2,160	33.8	+0.3
Liberal Democrats hold		Swing		
