= 2010 Worthing Borough Council election =

2010 UK local government election

← 2008	6 May 2010	2011 →

14 out of 37 seats to Worthing Borough Council 19 seats needed for a majority

	First party	Second party
Party	Conservative	Liberal Democrats
Last election	25 seats, 50.5%	12 seats, 37.0%
Seats won	8	6
Seats after	25	12
Seat change	Steady	Steady
Popular vote	25,011	21,464
Percentage	46.4%	39.9%
Swing	▼4.1%	▲2.9%
	Third party	Fourth party
Party	UKIP	Labour
Last election	0 seats, 7.7%	0 seats, 3.1%
Seats won	0	0
Seats after	0	0
Seat change	Steady	Steady
Popular vote	3,977	3,365
Percentage	7.4%	6.3%
Swing	▼0.3%	▲3.2%
- Map of the results of the 2010 Worthing council election. Conservatives in blue and Liberal Democrats in yellow.
Council control before election
Conservative
Council control after election
Conservative

The 2010 Worthing Borough Council election took place on 6 May 2010 to elect members of Worthing Borough Council in West Sussex, England. One third of the council was up for election and the Conservative Party stayed in overall control of the council.

After the election, the composition of the council was:

- Conservative: 25
- Liberal Democrat: 12

== Election result ==
Worthing local election result 2010
Party	Seats	Gains	Losses	Net gain/loss	Seats %	Votes %	Votes	+/−
Conservative	8	2	2	0	57.1	46.4	25,011	-4.1%
Liberal Democrats	6	2	2	0	42.9	39.9	21,464	+2.9%
UKIP	0	0	0	0	0	7.4	3,977	-0.3%
Labour	0	0	0	0	0	6.25	3,365	+3.15%

=== Ward results ===
Broadwater
Party	Candidate	Votes	%	±%
Conservative	Victoria Vaughn	1,774	41.30	−6.30
Liberal Democrats	James Nelson	1,737	40.44	−5.86
Labour	John Turley	446	10.38	+3.98
UKIP	Colin Avis	318	7.40	N/A
Rejected ballots		20	0.48	
Majority		37	0.86	−0.34
Turnout		4,295	63	+30
Conservative gain from Liberal Democrats		Swing	LD to Con 0.17	

Castle
Party	Candidate	Votes	%	±%
Liberal Democrats	Trevor England	2,199	58.08	+2.08
Conservative	Damon Turner	1,542	40.72	−3.28
Rejected ballots		45	1.20	
Majority		657	17.35	+5.75
Turnout		3,786	60	+27
Liberal Democrats gain from Conservative		Swing		

Central
Party	Candidate	Votes	%	±%
Liberal Democrats	Davd Chapman	1,603	42.94	+2.64
Conservative	Stephen Murray	1,358	36.37	−8.53
Labour	Janet Haden	505	13.52	+5.12
UKIP	Christopher Woodward	242	6.48	−0.62
Rejected ballots		25	0.69	
Majority		245	6.56	+11.86
Turnout		3733	54	+26
Liberal Democrats gain from Conservative		Swing		

Durrington
Party	Candidate	Votes	%	±%
Conservative	Charles James	1,303	45.18	+4.18
Liberal Democrats	Keith Sunderland	1,259	43.65	−2.00
UKIP	Shaune Wilma	310	10.50	−3.30
Rejected ballots		25	0.87	
Majority		44	1.53	+6.53
Turnout		2,872	65	+30
Conservative gain from Liberal Democrats		Swing		

Gasford
Party	Candidate	Votes	%	±%
Liberal Democrats	Alan Rice	1,835	42.18	−2.82
Conservative	John Rogers	1,708	39.26	−8.24
Labour	Matthew Smith	463	10.64	+4.14
UKIP	John Harwood	324	7.44	N/A
Rejected ballots		20	0.48	
Majority		127	2.91	+6.41
Turnout		4,350	64	+32
Liberal Democrats hold		Swing		

Goring
Party	Candidate	Votes	%	±%
Conservative	Steven Waight	2,774	56.61	−11.69
Liberal Democrats	Neil Condon	1,076	21.96	+3.36
Labour	James Elwood	569	11.61	−1.49
UKIP	Richard Bater	445	9.08	N/A
Rejected ballots		36	0.74	
Majority		1,698	34.65	−14.95
Turnout		4,900	72	+30
Conservative hold		Swing	7.475% Con to LD	

Heene
Party	Candidate	Votes	%	±%
Conservative	Carol Molineaux	1,642	46.47	−15.23
Liberal Democrats	Wayne Hoban	1,337	37.84	−0.46
Labour	Susan Marsh	534	15.11	N/A
Rejected ballots		20	0.58	
Majority		307	8.63	−14.77
Turnout		3,533	56	+28
Conservative hold		Swing	7.375% Con to LD	

Marine (2)
Party	Candidate	Votes	%	±%
Conservative	Thomas Wye	2,339	30.50	
Conservative	Paul Yallop	1,981	25.83	
Liberal Democrats	Christine Allen	1,467	19.12	
Liberal Democrats	Yvonne Leonard	1,339	17.45	
UKIP	Phillip Ruddock	510	6.64	
Rejected ballots		34	0.46	
Majority		872	11.36	
Majority		514	6.70	
Turnout		7,670	65	+32
Conservative hold		Swing		
Conservative hold		Swing		

Northbrook
Party	Candidate	Votes	%	±%
Liberal Democrats	Diane Jones	1,011	53.57	
Conservative	Alan Whitley	861	45.62	
Rejected ballots		15	0.81	
Majority		150	7.95	
Turnout		1,887	53	+27
Liberal Democrats hold		Swing		

Offington
Party	Candidate	Votes	%	±%
Conservative	Reginald Green	2,617	56.25	
Liberal Democrats	Michael Cranefield	1,124	24.16	
UKIP	Michael Glennon	496	10.66	
Labour	John Gardiner	384	8.25	
Rejected ballots		31	0.68	
Majority		1,493	31.09	
Turnout		4,652	74	+36
Conservative hold		Swing		

Salvington
Party	Candidate	Votes	%	±%
Conservative	Nicola Waight	2,343	50.59	
Liberal Democrats	Jacqueline Cranefield	1,659	35.82	
UKIP	Patricia Hall	589	12.71	
Rejected ballots		40	0.88	
Majority		684	14.77	
Turnout		4,631	64	+32
Conservative hold		Swing		

Selden
Party	Candidate	Votes	%	±%
Liberal Democrats	Christine Brown	1,702	45.68	
Conservative	Jane Rogers	1,273	35.82	
Labour	Ann Saunders	464	12.45	
UKIP	Rita Offen	264	7.09	
Rejected ballots		23	0.61	
Majority		429	11.51	
Turnout		3,726	60	+21
Liberal Democrats hold		Swing		

Tarring
Party	Candidate	Votes	%	±%
Liberal Democrats	Robert Smytherman	2,166	52.50	
Conservative	Timothy Chick	1,496	35.31	
UKIP	Anthony Fallone	479	11.27	
Rejected ballots		21	0.50	
Majority		670	17.19	
Turnout		4,162	64	+33
Liberal Democrats hold		Swing		
