= 2012 Worthing Borough Council election =

2012 UK local government election

← 2011	3 May 2012	2014 →

14 out of 37 seats to Worthing Borough Council 19 seats needed for a majority

	First party	Second party
Party	Conservative	Liberal Democrats
Last election	25 seats, 46.0%	11 seats, 24.4%
Seats won	10	4
Seats after	24	12
Seat change	▼1	▲1
Popular vote	9,888	5,858
Percentage	41.4%	24.6%
Swing	▼4.6%	▲0.2%
	Third party	Fourth party
Party	UKIP	Labour
Last election	0 seats, 10.9%	0 seats, 17.4%
Seats won	0	0
Seats after	0	0
Seat change	Steady	Steady
Popular vote	4,043	3,636
Percentage	16.9%	15.2%
Swing	▲6.0%	▼2.2%
- Map showing the election results. Each ward had one seat up for election.
Council control before election
Conservative
Council control after election
Conservative

The 2012 Worthing Borough Council election took place on 3 May 2012 to elect members of Worthing Borough Council in West Sussex, England. One third of the council was elected, including a double vacancy in Offington ward. The Conservative Party remained in overall control of the council.

The composition of the council after the election was:

- Conservative: 24 (+1)
- Liberal Democrat: 12 (+1)
- Independent: 1 (-2)

Ward	Party	Incumbent Elected	Incumbent	Standing again	Gain/Hold
Broadwater	Conservative	2008	Don Allen	No	Conservative hold
Castle	Liberal Democrats	2008	David Potter	Yes	Liberal Democrat hold
Central	Conservative	2008	Martin Coppard	No	Conservative hold
Durrington	Liberal Democrats	2008	Michael Donnin	Yes	Liberal Democrat hold
Gaisford	Conservative	2008	Ann Barlow	No	Conservative hold
Goring	Conservative	2008	Mary Lermite	Yes	Conservative hold
Heene	Conservative	2008	Paul High	Yes	Conservative hold
Marine	Conservative	2008	Joan Bradley	Yes	Conservative hold
Northbrook	Conservative	2008	Mary Harding	Yes	Liberal Democrat gain
Offington	Conservative	2008	Elizabeth Sparkes	Yes	Conservative hold
Offington	Conservative	2010	Vacant	N/A	Conservative hold
Salvington	Independent	2008	Jacqui Marsh	No	Conservative gain
Selden	Independent	2008	James Doyle	No	Conservative gain
Tarring	Liberal Democrats	2008	Norah Fisher	Yes	Liberal Democrat hold

== Election result ==
Worthing local election result 2012
Party	Seats	Gains	Losses	Net gain/loss	Seats %	Votes %	Votes	+/−
Conservative	10	2	1	+1	71.4	41.4	9,888	
Liberal Democrats	4	1	0	+1	28.6	24.6	5,858	
UKIP	0	0	0	0	0	16.9	4,043	
Labour	0	0	0	0	0	15.2	3,636	
Independent	0	0	2	-2	0	0	0	

=== Ward results ===
Broadwater
Party	Candidate	Votes	%	±%
Conservative	Vic Walker	585	33.14	
Liberal Democrats	James Nelson	513	29.07	
Labour	Lynda Newbury	371	21.01	
UKIP	Colin Avis	296	16.77	
Rejected ballots				
Majority				
Turnout				
Conservative hold		Swing		

Castle
Party	Candidate	Votes	%	±%
Liberal Democrats	David Potter	701	40.33	
Conservative	Anne Chapman	505	29.06	
UKIP	Christopher Chatfield	270	15.54	
Labour	Ian Walker	262	15.07	
Rejected ballots				
Majority				
Turnout				
Liberal Democrats hold		Swing		

Central
Party	Candidate	Votes	%	±%
Conservative	Vino Vinojan	494	29.49	
Labour	Russell Deen	404	24.12	
Liberal Democrats	Laura Scott	327	19.52	
UKIP	Christopher Wooward	254	15.16	
Green	Margaret Pearce	196	11.70	
Rejected ballots				
Majority				
Turnout				
Conservative hold		Swing		

Durrington
Party	Candidate	Votes	%	±%
Liberal Democrats	Michael Donnin	505	36.12	
Conservative	Pauline James	492	35.19	
UKIP	Mike Jelliss	218	15.59	
Labour	Guy Chadwick	183	13.09	
Rejected ballots				
Majority				
Turnout				
Liberal Democrats hold		Swing		

Gaisford
Party	Candidate	Votes	%	±%
Conservative	Val Turner	671	36.65	
Liberal Democrats	Emma Davies	577	31.51	
Labour	John Turley	329	17.97	
UKIP	John Harwood	254	13.87	
Rejected ballots				
Majority				
Turnout				
Conservative hold		Swing		

Goring
Party	Candidate	Votes	%	±%
Conservative	Mary Lermitte	1200	50.23	
UKIP	Richard Bater	482	20.18	
Labour	James Elwood	359	15.03	
Green	David Aherne	178	7.45	
Liberal Democrats	Michael Finch	170	7.12	
Rejected ballots				
Majority				
Turnout				
Conservative hold		Swing		

Heene
Party	Candidate	Votes	%	±%
Conservative	Paul High	685	47.54	
Liberal Democrats	Shân Orr-Ewíng	425	29.49	
UKIP	Richard Setford	331	22.97	
Rejected ballots				
Majority				
Turnout				
Conservative hold		Swing		

Marine
Party	Candidate	Votes	%	±%
Conservative	Joan Bradley	959	49.82	
Labour	Alexandra Wagstaff	357	18.55	
UKIP	Phil Ruddock	349	18.13	
Liberal Democrats	Yvonne Leonard	260	13.51	
Rejected ballots				
Majority				
Turnout				
Conservative hold		Swing		

Northbrook
Party	Candidate	Votes	%	±%
Liberal Democrats	Keith Sunderland	298	40.22	
Conservative	Mary Harding	294	39.68	
Labour	Janet Haden	86	11.61	
Green	William Morris	63	6.50	
Rejected ballots				
Majority				
Turnout				
Liberal Democrats gain from Conservative		Swing		

Offington
Party	Candidate	Votes	%	±%
Conservative	Elizabeth Andrews-Sparkes	1107	31.48	
Conservative	John Rogers	959	27.28	
UKIP	Mike Glennon	599	17.04	
Liberal Democrats	Linda Williams	305	8.67	
Labour	John Steels	290	8.25	
Liberal Democrats	Trudi Starling	256	7.28	
Rejected ballots				
Majority				
Turnout				
Conservative hold		Swing		
Conservative hold		Swing		

Salvington
Party	Candidate	Votes	%	±%
Conservative	Michale Cloake	884	46.67	
UKIP	Trixie Hall	456	24.08	
Labour	John Martin	297	15,68	
Liberal Democrats	Neil Campbell	257	13.57	
Rejected ballots				
Majority				
Turnout				
Conservative gain from Independent		Swing		

Selden
Party	Candidate	Votes	%	±%
Conservative	Keith Bickers	605	33.63	
Liberal Democrats	Jacqueline Cranefield	498	27.68	
Labour	Michael Barrett	429	23.85	
UKIP	Grant Lloyd	267	14.84	
Rejected ballots				
Majority				
Turnout				
Conservative gain from Independent		Swing		

Tarring
Party	Candidate	Votes	%	±%
Liberal Democrats	Norah Fisher	763	43.67	
Conservative	Tim Chick	448	25.64	
Labour	Peter Barnes	269	15.40	
UKIP	Shaune King	267	15.28	
Rejected ballots				
Majority				
Turnout				
Liberal Democrats hold		Swing		
