= 2008 Worthing Borough Council election =

2008 UK local government election

← 2007	1 May 2008	2010 →

13 out of 37 seats to Worthing Borough Council 19 seats needed for a majority

	First party	Second party	Third party
Party	Conservative	Liberal Democrats	UKIP
Last election	24 seats, 52.4%	12 seats, 38.7%	0 seats, 5.5%
Seats won	9	4	0
Seats after	25	12	0
Seat change	▲1	Steady	Steady
Popular vote	13,137	9,632	2,008
Percentage	50.5%	37.0%	7.7%
Swing	▼1.9%	▲4.4%	▲2.2%
- Map of the results of the 2008 Worthing council election. Conservatives in blue and Liberal Democrats in yellow.
Council control before election
Conservative
Council control after election
Conservative

The 2008 Worthing Borough Council election took place on 1 May 2008 to elect members of Worthing Borough Council in West Sussex, England. One third of the council was up for election and the Conservative Party stayed in overall control of the council. Overall turnout was 35%.

Candidates from five political parties took part in the election from the Conservatives, Liberal Democrats, British National Party, Labour and United Kingdom Independence Party and one candidate standing on a "Stop! Durrington's Overdevelopment – Save Titnore's Trees" platform. The results of the election were declared at a joint count with Adur council, the first time such a joint count had taken place in West Sussex. The count saw an incident where one candidate, Dawn Smith, was arrested after some of her supporters were prevented from entering the count.

The results saw the Conservatives gain three seats to increase their majority on the council. They gained Broadwater ward from the Liberal Democrats, and also Goring where the previous councillor had defected from the Conservatives to the Liberal Democrats. The third Conservative gain was in Offington where the previous councillor, Mark McCarthy, had been elected as a Conservative, but had resigned to sit as an independent Conservative. The Liberal Democrats did make one gain when they took Selden ward, where the previous Conservative councillor had stood down.

After the election, the composition of the council was:

- Conservative 25
- Liberal Democrat 12

== Election result ==
Worthing local election result 2008
Party	Seats	Gains	Losses	Net gain/loss	Seats %	Votes %	Votes	+/−
Conservative	9	3	1	+2	69.2	50.5	13,137	-1.9%
Liberal Democrats	4	1	2	-1	30.8	37.0	9,632	+4.4%
UKIP	0	0	0	0	0	7.7	2,008	+2.2%
Labour	0	0	0	0	0	3.1	813	-1.6%
BNP	0	0	0	0	0	1.3	326	+1.3%
Stop Durrington's Overdevelopment – Save Titnore's Trees	0	0	0	0	0	0.4	99	-0.2%
Independent	0	0	1	-1	0	0	0	0

== Ward results ==
Broadwater
Party	Candidate	Votes	%	±%
Conservative	Don Allen	977	47.4	−2.2
Liberal Democrats	Nick John	952	46.2	+2.2
Labour	John Turley	132	6.4	0.0
Majority		25	1.2	−4.4
Turnout		2,061		
Conservative gain from Liberal Democrats		Swing		

Castle
Party	Candidate	Votes	%	±%
Liberal Democrats	David Potter	1,167	55.8	
Conservative	Ruth White	926	44.2	
Majority		241	11.6	
Turnout		2,093	33	−2.5
Liberal Democrats hold		Swing		

Central
Party	Candidate	Votes	%	±%
Conservative	Martin Coppard	791	44.9	+2.2
Liberal Democrats	Neil Condon	698	39.6	+8.8
Labour	Peter Barnes	148	8.4	−0.4
UKIP	Christopher Woodward	126	7.1	+2.3
Majority		93	5.3	−6.6
Turnout		1,763	28	−3.5
Conservative hold		Swing		

Durrington
Party	Candidate	Votes	%	±%
Liberal Democrats	Michael Donin	708	45.6	
Conservative	Mark Withers	631	40.6	
UKIP	Chris Chatfield	215	13.8	
Majority		77	5.0	
Turnout		1,554	35	−1.1
Liberal Democrats hold		Swing		

Gaisford
Party	Candidate	Votes	%	±%
Conservative	Ann Barlow	1,026	48.5	+1.1
Liberal Democrats	Janet Goldsbrough-Jones	951	45.0	+8.1
Labour	Hazel Rennie	137	6.5	−0.8
Majority		75	3.5	−7.0
Turnout		2,114	32	−3.0
Conservative hold		Swing		

Goring
Party	Candidate	Votes	%	±%
Conservative	Mary Lermitte	1,921	68.3	+5.4
Liberal Democrats	Merlin Jones	523	18.6	+4.4
UKIP	Richard Bater	368	13.1	+1.9
Majority		1,398	49.7	+1.0
Turnout		2,812	42	−1.0
Conservative gain from Liberal Democrats		Swing		

Heene
Party	Candidate	Votes	%	±%
Conservative	Paul High	1,018	61.7	+8.1
Liberal Democrats	Alan Jones	632	38.3	+14.4
Majority		386	23.4	−6.3
Turnout		1,650	28	−3.0
Conservative hold		Swing		

Marine
Party	Candidate	Votes	%	±%
Conservative	Joan Bradley	1,351	63.2	−0.2
Liberal Democrats	Gary Riding	508	23.8	+9.4
UKIP	Phil Ruddock	278	13.0	+5.8
Majority		843	39.4	−9.6
Turnout		2,137	33	−3.7
Conservative hold		Swing		

Northbrook
Party	Candidate	Votes	%	±%
Conservative	Mary Harding	372	40.5	−5.0
Liberal Democrats	Michael Cranefield	354	38.6	−15.9
Stop Durrington's Overdevelopment – Save Titnore's Trees	Dawn Smith	99	10.8	+10.8
BNP	Jim Baxter	93	10.1	+10.1
Majority		18	1.9	
Turnout		918	26	+3.9
Conservative hold		Swing		

Offington
Party	Candidate	Votes	%	±%
Conservative	Elizabeth Sparkes	1,533	64.8	−12.4
UKIP	Mike Glennon	402	17.0	+17.0
Liberal Democrats	Patricia Izod	289	12.2	−5.6
Labour	John Gardiner	142	6.0	+0.9
Majority		1,131	47.8	−11.6
Turnout		2,366	38	−1.0
Conservative gain from Independent		Swing		

Salvington
Party	Candidate	Votes	%	±%
Conservative	Jacqui Marsh	1,311	57.5	−3.8
Liberal Democrats	Jacqueline Cranefield	540	23.7	−0.4
UKIP	Ron Brooks	428	18.8	+4.2
Majority		771	33.8	−3.4
Turnout		2,279	32	−3.0
Conservative hold		Swing		

Selden
Party	Candidate	Votes	%	±%
Liberal Democrats	James Doyle	1,227	54.1	+9.5
Conservative	Stephanie Hedley-Barnes	673	29.7	−15.5
BNP	David Little	233	10.3	+10.3
Labour	Ann Saunders	133	5.9	−4.3
Majority		554	34.4	
Turnout		2,266	39	+3.0
Liberal Democrats gain from Conservative		Swing		

Tarring
Party	Candidate	Votes	%	±%
Liberal Democrats	Norah Fisher	1,083	54.1	−4.2
Conservative	David Ide	607	30.3	+1.0
UKIP	Ann Brown	191	9.5	+2.8
Labour	Sid Wells	121	6.0	+0.2
Majority		476	23.8	−5.2
Turnout		2,002	31	−2.8
Liberal Democrats hold		Swing		
