= 2006 Worthing Borough Council election =

2006 UK local government election

← 2004	4 May 2006	2007 →

14 out of 37 seats to Worthing Borough Council 19 seats needed for a majority

	First party	Second party
Party	Conservative	Liberal Democrats
Last election	26 seats, 56.2%	11 seats, 36.8%
Seats won	7	7
Seats after	23	14
Seat change	▼3	▲3
Popular vote	14,364	10,659
Percentage	52.2%	38.7%
Swing	▼4.0%	▲1.9%
- Map of the results of the 2006 Worthing council election. Conservatives in blue and Liberal Democrats in yellow.
Council control before election
Conservative
Council control after election
Conservative

The 2006 Worthing Borough Council election took place on 4 May 2006 to elect members of Worthing Borough Council in West Sussex, England. One third of the council was up for election and the Conservative Party stayed in overall control of the council.

The results saw the Conservatives suffer a net loss of three seats to the Liberal Democrats although they remained in control of the council. The Liberal Democrats gained a seat in Gaisford and Northbrook wards and both seats in Durrington, with the winner in Northbrook, Diane Jones, becoming the youngest female councillor in Worthing at the age of 22. However the Conservatives narrowly gained a seat back in Central ward. After the results were declared an investigation was ordered when 452 ballots were spoilt in just the one ward of Offington as compared to an average of 30 in other wards.

After the election, the composition of the council was:

- Conservative – 23
- Liberal Democrat – 14

== Election result ==
Worthing local election result 2006
Party	Seats	Gains	Losses	Net gain/loss	Seats %	Votes %	Votes	+/−
Conservative	7	1	3	-3	50.0	52.2	14,364	-4.0%
Liberal Democrats	7	4	1	+3	50.0	38.7	10,659	+1.9%
Green	0	0	0	0	0	4.6	1,279	+0.7%
UKIP	0	0	0	0	0	2.6	718	+2.6%
Labour	0	0	0	0	0	1.9	511	-0.3%

== Ward results ==
Broadwater
Party	Candidate	Votes	%	±%
Liberal Democrats	Sheila Player	1,126	52.2	
Conservative	Simon Studd	766	35.5	
Green	Derek Colkett	267	12.4	
Majority		360	16.7	
Turnout		2,159	33.3	−0.5
Liberal Democrats hold		Swing		

Castle
Party	Candidate	Votes	%	±%
Conservative	John Rogers	999	47.3	
Liberal Democrats	David Potter	884	41.9	
Green	Julian Warrick	228	10.8	
Majority		115	5.4	
Turnout		2,111	34.7	−2.9
Conservative hold		Swing		

Central
Party	Candidate	Votes	%	±%
Conservative	Paul Yallop	773	41.6	
Liberal Democrats	Janet Goldsbrough-Jones	702	37.8	
Green	Lucielle Colkett	218	11.7	
Labour	Peter Barnes	164	8.8	
Majority		71	3.8	
Turnout		1,857	30.0	−3.3
Conservative gain from Liberal Democrats		Swing		

Durrington (2)
Party	Candidate	Votes	%	±%
Liberal Democrats	Keith Sutherland	805		
Liberal Democrats	Michael Donin	794		
Conservative	Mark Withers	771		
Conservative	Ann Sayers	768		
Turnout		3,138	36.1	
Liberal Democrats gain from Conservative		Swing		
Liberal Democrats gain from Conservative		Swing		

Gaisford
Party	Candidate	Votes	%	±%
Liberal Democrats	Alan Rice	969	44.5	
Conservative	Kenneth Brady	914	42.0	
Green	Marie Hillcoat	295	13.5	
Majority		55	2.5	
Turnout		2,178	33.3	−3.8
Liberal Democrats gain from Conservative		Swing		

Goring
Party	Candidate	Votes	%	±%
Conservative	Steven Waight	1,807	66.3	
Liberal Democrats	Christine Allen	546	20.0	
UKIP	Richard Bater	372	13.7	
Majority		1,261	46.3	
Turnout		2,725	41.2	
Conservative hold		Swing		

Heene
Party	Candidate	Votes	%	±%
Conservative	Carol Molineaux	1,098	62.0	
Liberal Democrats	Alan Jones	674	38.0	
Majority		424	24.0	
Turnout		1,772	30.6	−5.0
Conservative hold		Swing		

Marine
Party	Candidate	Votes	%	±%
Conservative	Tom Wye	1,489	60.0	
Liberal Democrats	Chris Baker	383	15.4	
Green	Tracey Thompson	271	10.9	
Labour	Barrie Slater	173	7.0	
UKIP	Philip Ruddock	166	6.7	
Majority		1,106	44.6	
Turnout		2,482	38.3	−4.3
Conservative hold		Swing		

Northbrook
Party	Candidate	Votes	%	±%
Liberal Democrats	Diane Jones	404	54.5	
Conservative	Mark O'Keeffe	337	45.5	
Majority		67	9.0	
Turnout		741	22.1	−5.6
Liberal Democrats gain from Conservative		Swing		

Offington
Party	Candidate	Votes	%	±%
Conservative	Reg Green	1,476	74.7	
Liberal Democrats	Norah Fisher	501	25.3	
Majority		975	49.4	
Turnout		1,977	39.1	−4.2
Conservative hold		Swing		

Salvington
Party	Candidate	Votes	%	±%
Conservative	Heather Mercer	1,643	70.8	
Liberal Democrats	Michael Cranefield	679	29.2	
Majority		964	41.6	
Turnout		2,322	33.2	−5.5
Conservative hold		Swing		

Selden
Party	Candidate	Votes	%	±%
Liberal Democrats	Christine Brown	1,043	53.5	
Conservative	Roger Oakley	905	46.5	
Majority		138	7.0	
Turnout		1,948	33.1	−7.6
Liberal Democrats hold		Swing		

Tarring
Party	Candidate	Votes	%	±%
Liberal Democrats	Bob Smytherman	1,149	54.2	
Conservative	David Ide	618	29.1	
UKIP	Christopher Woodward	180	8.5	
Labour	Sidney Wells	174	8.2	
Majority		531	25.1	
Turnout		2,121	33.5	−2.6
Liberal Democrats hold		Swing		
