= 2003 Worthing Borough Council election =

2003 UK local government election

← 2002	1 May 2003	2004 →

13 out of 36 seats to Worthing Borough Council 19 seats needed for a majority

	First party	Second party
Party	Liberal Democrats	Conservative
Last election	19 seats, 43.9%	17 seats, 44.9%
Seats won	5	8
Seats after	18	18
Seat change	▼1	▲1
Popular vote	9,724	12,297
Percentage	41.0%	51.8%
Swing	▼2.9%	▲6.9%
Council control before election
Liberal Democrats
Council control after election
No overall control

The 2003 Worthing Borough Council election took place on 1 May 2003 to elect members of Worthing Borough Council in West Sussex, England. One third of the council was up for election and the Liberal Democrats lost overall control of the council to no overall control. Overall turnout was 28.61%.

The election saw 38 candidates from 4 parties competing for the 13 seats which were being contested. 7 sitting councillors stood down at the election which saw the Liberal Democrats attempting to defend the majority they had won in the previous election in 2002. The Liberal Democrats campaigned on the record of their "Clean and Safe Worthing" campaign and on plans to upgrade the leisure centre and replace the Aquarena. However the Conservatives attacked them for stopping improvements to the seafront and for the poor state of facilities in Worthing. The Green and Labour parties also stood candidates but did not contest all of the wards with Labour only putting up 3 candidates.

The results saw the Conservatives make one gain from the Liberal Democrats in Selden ward, with the winner, Jack Saheid, becoming the first Muslim councillor on Worthing council. After the Liberal Democrats failed by 6 votes to gain Gaisford from the Conservatives, both parties ended the election on 18 seats making Worthing a hung council. The results meant that the Liberal Democrat mayor of Worthing had the casting vote on the council.

After the election, the composition of the council was:

- Conservative 18
- Liberal Democrat 18

== Election result ==
Worthing local election result 2003
Party	Seats	Gains	Losses	Net gain/loss	Seats %	Votes %	Votes	+/−
Conservative	8	1	0	+1	61.5	51.8	12,297	+6.9%
Liberal Democrats	5	0	1	-1	38.5	41.0	9,724	-2.9%
Green	0	0	0	0	0	5.1	1,210	+1.6%
Labour	0	0	0	0	0	2.1	503	-5.5%

== Ward results ==
Broadwater
Party	Candidate	Votes	%	±%
Liberal Democrats	Geraldine Lissenburg	1,069	65.9	−2.9
Conservative	Heather Mercer	427	26.3	+4.0
Green	Derek Colkett	125	7.7	+7.7
Majority		642	39.6	−6.9
Turnout		1,621	25.0	−0.8
Liberal Democrats hold		Swing		

Castle
Party	Candidate	Votes	%	±%
Liberal Democrats	Claire Potter	923	54.5	+3.5
Conservative	John Rogers	771	45.5	+12.1
Majority		152	9.0	−8.6
Turnout		1,694	28.6	−3.1
Liberal Democrats hold		Swing		

Central
Party	Candidate	Votes	%	±%
Liberal Democrats	Geoffrey Hart	667	47.4	−11.3
Conservative	Martin Coppard	472	33.5	+4.6
Labour	Brian Gill	158	11.2	−1.2
Green	Alice-Amanda Hinton	111	7.9	+7.9
Majority		195	13.9	−15.9
Turnout		1,408	24.4	−2.1
Liberal Democrats hold		Swing		

Durrington
Party	Candidate	Votes	%	±%
Liberal Democrats	Nick Rodgers	1,168	56.3	−8.5
Conservative	Alan Whiteley	787	37.9	+8.9
Green	John Dwyer	121	5.8	−0.4
Majority		381	18.4	−17.4
Turnout		2,076	25.1	−5.0
Liberal Democrats hold		Swing		

Gaisford
Party	Candidate	Votes	%	±%
Conservative	George Stephens	752	45.7	+7.9
Liberal Democrats	Antony Price	746	45.3	−3.8
Green	Marie Hillcoat	149	9.0	+4.5
Majority		6	0.4	
Turnout		1,647	25.5	−4.8
Conservative hold		Swing		

Goring
Party	Candidate	Votes	%	±%
Conservative	Peter Welch	1,732	73.4	+2.1
Liberal Democrats	Brian Stephenson	628	26.6	−2.1
Majority		1,104	46.8	+4.2
Turnout		2,360	35.4	−2.2
Conservative hold		Swing		

Heene (2)
Party	Candidate	Votes	%	±%
Conservative	Tim Dice	996		
Conservative	Paul High	949		
Liberal Democrats	Alan Jones	513		
Liberal Democrats	Kevin Skepper	418		
Green	Heather Rogers	191		
Turnout		3,067	25.2	−2.1
Conservative hold		Swing		
Conservative hold		Swing		

Marine
Party	Candidate	Votes	%	±%
Conservative	Tom Wye	1,282	63.6	+2.9
Liberal Democrats	Peter Medcalf	373	18.5	−0.6
Labour	Peter Barnes	222	11.0	−0.3
Green	Lucielle Colkett	140	6.9	−2.0
Majority		909	45.1	+3.5
Turnout		2,017	31.4	−0.3
Conservative hold		Swing		

Offington
Party	Candidate	Votes	%	±%
Conservative	Mark McCarthy	1,490	69.7	+5.1
Liberal Democrats	David Moynan	489	22.9	−0.2
Green	Rosemary Hook	160	7.5	+2.2
Majority		1,001	46.8	+5.3
Turnout		2,139	33.7	−1.0
Conservative hold		Swing		

Salvington
Party	Candidate	Votes	%	±%
Conservative	Jacqueline Marsh	1,100	60.3	−0.3
Liberal Democrats	Mark O'Keeffe	723	39.7	+11.3
Majority		377	20.6	−11.6
Turnout		1,940	27.9	−1.9
Conservative hold		Swing		

Selden
Party	Candidate	Votes	%	±%
Conservative	Jack Saheid	1,053	51.2	+15.5
Liberal Democrats	Christine Brown	872	42.4	−2.4
Green	Dave Yates	130	6.3	+1.8
Majority		181	8.8	
Turnout		2,055	33.9	+0.4
Conservative gain from Liberal Democrats		Swing		

Tarring
Party	Candidate	Votes	%	±%
Liberal Democrats	John Lovell	1,135	62.1	−6.7
Conservative	Gavin Clark	486	26.6	+3.5
Labour	Ian Sandell	123	6.7	−1.4
Green	Benjamin Colkett	83	4.5	+4.5
Majority		649	35.5	−10.2
Turnout		1,827	27.6	−1.3
Liberal Democrats hold		Swing		
