= 2000 Worthing Borough Council election =

2000 UK local government election

The 2000 Worthing Borough Council election took place on 4 May 2000 to elect members of Worthing Borough Council in West Sussex, England. One third of the council was up for election and the Conservative Party held overall control of the council.

For the second election in a row, a former mayor defected in the run up to the election. This year Geraldine Lissenburg joined the Liberal Democrats after earlier leaving the Conservatives to sit briefly as an independent.

After the election, the composition of the council was:

- Conservative 20
- Liberal Democrat 16

== Election result ==
Worthing local election result 2000
Party	Seats	Gains	Losses	Net gain/loss	Seats %	Votes %	Votes	+/−
Conservative	8			+1	57.1			
Liberal Democrats	6			-1	42.9			

== Ward results ==
=== Broadwater ===
Broadwater
Party	Candidate	Votes	%	±%
Liberal Democrats	B. McLuskie	943	59.9	+6.4
Conservative	C. Green	471	29.9	−1.8
Labour	J. Gardiner	160	10.2	−4.7
Majority		472	30.0	N/A
Turnout			24.6	+1.8
Registered electors		6,406		
Liberal Democrats hold				

=== Castle ===
Castle (2)
Party	Candidate	Votes	%	±%
Conservative	N. John	816	45.3	+3.6
Conservative	M. O'Keeffe	793	44.0	
Liberal Democrats	G. Cornell	533	29.6	+1.0
Liberal Democrats	R. Smytherman	500	27.8	
Labour	A. Bignell	453	25.1	−3.5
Labour	J. Deen	431	23.9	
Majority		260	15.7	N/A
Turnout			30.0	+3.7
Registered electors		6,042		
Conservative hold				

=== Central ===
Central
Party	Candidate	Votes	%	±%
Liberal Democrats	M. Tucker	923	65.5	+11.2
Conservative	G. Wootton	487	34.5	+2.6
Majority		436	31.0	N/A
Turnout			25.4	−0.9
Registered electors		5,580		
Liberal Democrats hold				

=== Durrington ===
Durrington
Party	Candidate	Votes	%	±%
Liberal Democrats	I. Baker	1,335	58.1	+9.8
Conservative	T. Jackson	964	41.9	−0.3
Majority		371	16.2	N/A
Turnout			28.5	−1.8
Registered electors		8,107		
Liberal Democrats hold				

=== Gaisford ===
Gaisford
Party	Candidate	Votes	%	±%
Liberal Democrats	P. Green	880	50.1	+11.1
Conservative	P. Knott	783	44.6	−2.1
Green	D. McLean	94	5.4	N/A
Majority		97	5.5	N/A
Turnout			27.5	+1.1
Registered electors		6,413		
Liberal Democrats gain from Conservative		Swing	6.6	

=== Goring ===
Goring
Party	Candidate	Votes	%	±%
Conservative	S. Waight	1,755	76.4	+2.1
Liberal Democrats	N. Rodgers	542	23.6	+7.5
Majority		1,213	52.8	N/A
Turnout			34.4	−3.5
Registered electors		6,728		
Conservative hold				

=== Heene ===
Heene
Party	Candidate	Votes	%	±%
Conservative	J. Smith	931	59.9	−2.1
Liberal Democrats	F. Stephenson	503	32.4	+6.9
Green	D. Colkett	119	7.7	N/A
Majority		428	27.5	N/A
Turnout			24.3	−2.5
Registered electors		6,426		
Conservative hold				

=== Marine ===
Marine (2)
Party	Candidate	Votes	%	±%
Conservative	K. Mercer	1,207	62.3	+3.2
Conservative	K. Wingate	1,162	60.0	
Liberal Democrats	J. Doyle	562	29.0	+2.8
Liberal Democrats	D. Parker	544	28.1	
Green	L. Colkett	169	8.7	N/A
Majority		645	33.3	N/A
Turnout			30.4	−1.1
Registered electors		6,295		
Conservative hold				

=== Offington ===
Offington
Party	Candidate	Votes	%	±%
Conservative	R. Green	1,493	64.8	+1.7
Liberal Democrats	D. Lissenburg	673	29.2	+0.2
Labour	J. Young	138	6.0	−1.9
Majority		820	35.6	N/A
Turnout			36.6	+0.9
Registered electors		6,298		
Conservative hold				

=== Salvington ===
Salvington
Party	Candidate	Votes	%	±%
Conservative	A. Lynn	1,339	64.2	+11.8
Liberal Democrats	G. Harbinson	747	35.8	−3.0
Majority		592	28.4	N/A
Turnout			32.4	−0.4
Registered electors		6,468		
Conservative hold				

=== Selden ===
Selden
Party	Candidate	Votes	%	±%
Liberal Democrats	S. Player	815	45.8	−9.0
Conservative	P. High	748	42.0	+15.1
Labour	J. Turley	216	12.1	−6.2
Majority		67	3.8	N/A
Turnout			29.1	+0.1
Registered electors		6,109		
Liberal Democrats hold				

=== Tarring ===
Tarring
Party	Candidate	Votes	%	±%
Liberal Democrats	H. Thorpe	1,341	70.8	+9.8
Conservative	P. Honiball	554	29.2	−0.8
Majority		787	41.6	N/A
Turnout			29.0	+0.6
Registered electors		6,543		
Liberal Democrats hold				
