= 2004 Worthing Borough Council election =

2004 UK local government election

← 2003	10 June 2004	2006 →

37 out of 37 seats to Worthing Borough Council 19 seats needed for a majority

	First party	Second party
Party	Conservative	Liberal Democrats
Last election	18 seats, 51.8%	18 seats, 41.0%
Seats won	26	11
Seats after	26	11
Seat change	▲8	▼7
Popular vote	43,214	28,324
Percentage	56.2%	36.8%
Swing	▲4.4%	▼4.2%
- Map of the results of the 2004 Worthing council election. Conservatives in blue and Liberal Democrats in yellow.
Council control before election
No overall control
Council control after election
Conservative

The 2004 Worthing Borough Council election took place on 10 June 2004 to elect members of Worthing Borough Council in West Sussex, England. The whole council was up for election with boundary changes since the 2003 Worthing Council election increasing the number of seats by 1. The Conservative Party gained overall control of the council from no overall control. Overall turnout was 38.23%.

The campaign saw a debate between the two main parties on the council over development in Worthing and the fate of the local swimming pool Aquarina. The results saw the Conservatives make significant gains from the Liberal Democrats to take power in Worthing. The top Liberal Democrat to lose in the election was the leader of the council, Sheila Player, who came fourth in Selden ward and failed to be elected as a result. The defeat for the Liberal Democrats was put down to anger over a warning that they might have to close the local museum, art gallery and swimming pool to save money.

== Election result ==
Worthing local election result 2004
Party	Seats	Gains	Losses	Net gain/loss	Seats %	Votes %	Votes	+/−
Conservative	26			+8	70.3	56.2	43,214	+4.4
Liberal Democrats	11			-7	29.7	36.8	28,324	-4.2
Green	0			0	0.0	3.9	2,967	-1.2
Labour	0			0	0.0	2.2	1,715	+0.1
Independent	0			0	0.0	0.4	338	+0.4
Stop! Durrington's over development	0			0	0.0	0.3	216	+0.3
Legalise Cannabis	0			0	0.0	0.2	173	+0.2

== Ward results ==
Broadwater (3)
Party	Candidate	Votes	%	±%
Liberal Democrats	Geraldine Lissenburg	1,054		
Liberal Democrats	Kevin Skepper	913		
Liberal Democrats	Donald Allen	902		
Conservative	Jennifer Cuer-Green	824		
Conservative	Ann Terry	787		
Conservative	David Lafferty	769		
Green	Benjamin Colkett	384		
Labour	John Turley	272		
Turnout		5,905	33.8	

Castle (3)
Party	Candidate	Votes	%	±%
Liberal Democrats	Claire Potter	1,093		
Liberal Democrats	Robin Rogers	1,090		
Conservative	John Rogers	1,081		
Liberal Democrats	Benjamin Bonetti	1,078		
Conservative	Gina Taylore	1,042		
Conservative	Ruth White	1,012		
Turnout		6,396	37.6	

Central (3)
Party	Candidate	Votes	%	±%
Conservative	Martin Coppard	797		
Conservative	Clive Roberts	762		
Liberal Democrats	Mary Freeland	753		
Liberal Democrats	Maurice Tucker	721		
Conservative	Mary Lermitte	701		
Liberal Democrats	Janet Goldsbrough-Jones	700		
Green	Alice Hinton	377		
Labour	Peter Barnes	260		
Turnout		5,071	33.3	

Durrington (2)
Party	Candidate	Votes	%	±%
Conservative	Richard Falk	744		
Conservative	Ann Sayers	677		
Liberal Democrats	Mark O'Keeffe	621		
Liberal Democrats	Keith Sunderland	580		
Green	John Dwyer	295		
Turnout		2,917	37.6	

Gaisford (3)
Party	Candidate	Votes	%	±%
Conservative	Margaret Barlow	1,014		
Conservative	Bryan Turner	1,000		
Conservative	Kenneth Brady	983		
Liberal Democrats	Peter Medcalf	914		
Liberal Democrats	Donald Lissenburg	909		
Liberal Democrats	Alan Rice	870		
Green	Marie Hillcoat	409		
Labour	Julia Young	274		
Turnout		6,373	37.1	

Goring (3)
Party	Candidate	Votes	%	±%
Conservative	Nick John	2,138		
Conservative	Fiona Green	2,055		
Conservative	Steven Waight	2,044		
Liberal Democrats	Stephen Paris	677		
Liberal Democrats	Malcolm Grace	611		
Liberal Democrats	Susan Withnell	606		
Labour	Karen Clayton	317		
Turnout		8,448	47.1	

Heene (3)
Party	Candidate	Votes	%	±%
Conservative	Paul High	1,121		
Conservative	John Livermore	1,116		
Conservative	George Stephens	1,080		
Liberal Democrats	Christine Allen	560		
Liberal Democrats	Alan Jones	492		
Green	Christopher Taylor	393		
Liberal Democrats	Christopher Ralls	387		
Labour	Niall Duffy	302		
Legalise Cannabis	Sarah Chalk	173		
Turnout		5,624	35.6	

Marine (3)
Party	Candidate	Votes	%	±%
Conservative	Joan Bradley	1,713		
Conservative	Keith Mercer	1,640		
Conservative	Tom Wye	1,637		
Liberal Democrats	Susan Millard	586		
Liberal Democrats	Patricia Izod	499		
Green	Lucielle Colkett	488		
Liberal Democrats	Brian Stephenson	469		
Labour	Barrie Slater	290		
Turnout		7,322	42.6	

Northbrook (2)
Party	Candidate	Votes	%	±%
Conservative	Mary Harding	410		
Conservative	Alan Whiteley	367		
Liberal Democrats	Val Capon	288		
Liberal Democrats	Merlin Jones	247		
Stop! Durrington's over development	Dawn Smith	216		
Green	Thelma Brown	165		
Turnout		1,693	27.7	

Offington (3)
Party	Candidate	Votes	%	±%
Conservative	Mark McCarthy	1,857		
Conservative	Graham Fabes	1,837		
Conservative	Reg Green	1,828		
Liberal Democrats	Paul Daniels	674		
Liberal Democrats	David Moynan	567		
Liberal Democrats	Maria Moynan	559		
Turnout		7,322	43.3	

Salvington (3)
Party	Candidate	Votes	%	±%
Conservative	Jacqui Marsh	1,656		
Conservative	Noel Atkins	1,617		
Conservative	Heather Mercer	1,517		
Liberal Democrats	Iona Baker	725		
Liberal Democrats	Samantha O'Keeffe	638		
Liberal Democrats	Stephen Bates	630		
Green	Derek Colkett	456		
Turnout		7,239	38.7	

Selden (3)
Party	Candidate	Votes	%	±%
Conservative	Jack Saheid	1,185		
Liberal Democrats	James Doyle	1,161		
Liberal Democrats	Christine Brown	1,149		
Liberal Democrats	Sheila Player	1,108		
Conservative	David Turner	1,038		
Conservative	Sarah-Jane King	1,025		
Turnout		6,666	40.7	

Tarring (3)
Party	Candidate	Votes	%	±%
Liberal Democrats	John Lovell	1,247		
Liberal Democrats	Hazel Thorpe	1,169		
Liberal Democrats	Bob Smytherman	1,077		
Conservative	Kate Brady	725		
Conservative	David Ide	709		
Conservative	Geoffrey Bird	706		
Independent	Ian Sandell	338		
Turnout		5,971	36.1	
