= 2011 Worthing Borough Council election =

2011 UK local government election

← 2010	5 May 2011	2012 →

11 out of 37 seats to Worthing Borough Council 19 seats needed for a majority

	First party	Second party
Party	Conservative	Liberal Democrats
Last election	25 seats, 46.4%	12 seats, 39.9%
Seats won	9	2
Seats after	25	11
Seat change	Steady	▼1
Popular vote	13,256	7,023
Percentage	46.0%	24.4%
Swing	▼0.4%	▼15.5%
	Third party	Fourth party
Party	Labour	UKIP
Last election	0 seats, 6.3%	0 seats, 7.4%
Seats won	0	0
Seats after	0	0
Seat change	Steady	Steady
Popular vote	5,004	3,143
Percentage	17.4%	10.9%
Swing	▲11.1%	▲3.5%
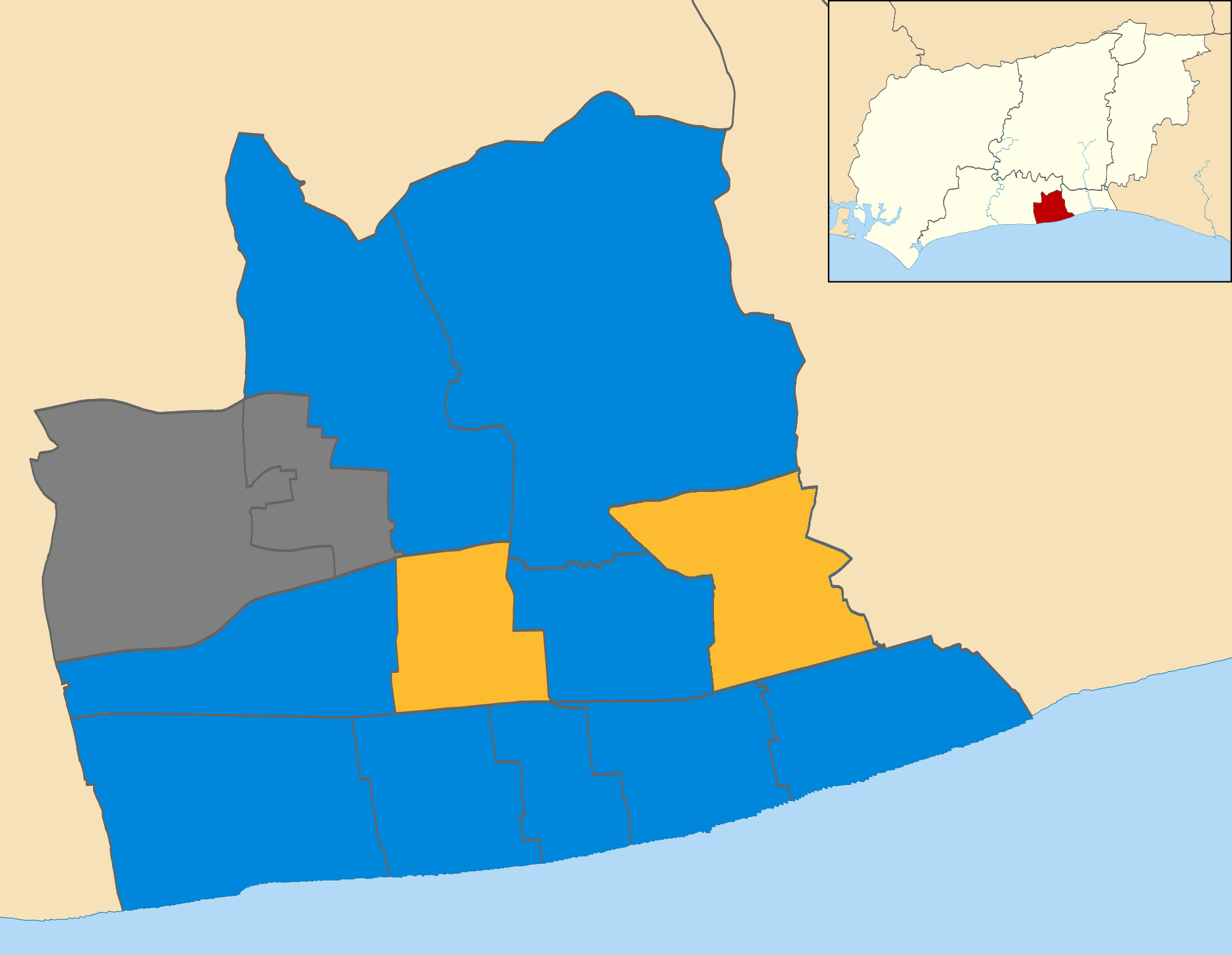
- Map of the results of the 2011 Worthing council election. Conservatives in blue, Liberal Democrats in yellow and grey not contested.
Council control before election
Conservative
Council control after election
Conservative

The 2011 Worthing Borough Council election took place on 5 May 2011 to elect members of Worthing Borough Council in West Sussex, England. One third of the council was up for election, with the exception of the two member wards of Durrington and Northbrook. The Conservative Party retained overall control of the council.

After the election, the composition of the council was:

- Conservative: 25
- Liberal Democrat: 11
- Independent: 1

== Election result ==
Worthing local election result 2011
Party	Seats	Gains	Losses	Net gain/loss	Seats %	Votes %	Votes	+/−
Conservative	11	1	1	0	84.6			
Liberal Democrats	2	1	1	0	15.4			
UKIP	0	0	0	0	0			
Labour	0	0	0	0	0			
Green	0	0	0	0	0			

=== Ward results ===
Broadwater
Party	Candidate	Votes	%	±%
Liberal Democrats	Victoria Michelle Taylor	979	38.2	− 2.6
Conservative	Michael Pisko	828	32.3	−8.9
Labour	John Turley	479	18.6	+10.3
UKIP	John Strange	276	10.7	+3.3
Rejected ballots		13	0.5	+0.02
Majority		151	5.86	+6.72
Turnout		2575	38	−25
Liberal Democrats gain from Conservative		Swing	3.36 Conservative to Liberal Democrats	

Castle
Party	Candidate	Votes	%	±%
Conservative	Daniel Humphreys	892		
Liberal Democrats	Robin Rogers	807		
Labour	Russel Dean	436		
UKIP	Christopher Chatfield	251		
Rejected ballots		16		
Majority		85		
Turnout			38.9	− 21.1
Conservative gain from Liberal Democrats		Swing		

Central
Party	Candidate	Votes	%	±%
Conservative	Clive Roberts	893		
Liberal Democrats	Christine Allen	600		
Labour	Janet Haden	528		
UKIP	Christopher Woodward	202		
Rejected ballots		31		
Majority		293		
Turnout			32.1	−21.9
Conservative hold		Swing		

Gaisford
Party	Candidate	Votes	%	±%
Conservative	Bryan Turner	1,133	42.5	
Liberal Democrats	Keith Sunderland	767	28.7	
Labour	John Steels	485	18.2	
UKIP	John Harwood	281	10.5	
Rejected ballots		15		
Majority		366		
Turnout			40	−24
Conservative hold		Swing		

Goring
Party	Candidate	Votes	%	±%
Conservative	Roy Barraclough	1956		
Labour	James Elwood	411		
UKIP	Richard Bater	385		
Green	David Aherne	382		
Liberal Democrats	Michael Finch	253		
Rejected ballots		16		
Majority		1,545		
Turnout			50.7	+21.8
Conservative hold		Swing		

Heene
Party	Candidate	Votes	%	±%
Conservative	Paul Howard	1,144		
Labour	Susan Marsh	598		
Liberal Democrats	Wayne Hoban	433		
Rejected ballots		27		
Majority		546		
Turnout			35.4	−20.6
Conservative hold		Swing		

Marine
Party	Candidate	Votes	%	±%
Conservative	Paul Yalop	1614		
Labour	Alexandra Wagstaff	465		
Liberal Democrats	Yvonne Leonard	448		
UKIP	Phillip Ruddock	312		
Rejected ballots		19		
Majority		1149		
Turnout		2858	44.1	−20.9
Conservative hold		Swing		

Offington
Party	Candidate	Votes	%	±%
Conservative	Graham Fabes	1754	58.9	
UKIP	Michael Glennon	465	15.6	
Liberal Democrats	Neil Condon	431	14.4	
Labour	Ann Saunders	327	11.0	
Rejected ballots		17		
Majority		1,289		
Turnout			47.9	−26.1
Conservative hold		Swing		

Salvington
Party	Candidate	Votes	%	±%
Conservative	Noël Atkins	1539		
UKIP	Patricia Hall	443		
Liberal Democrats	Emma Davies	415		
Labour	Linda Salter	403		
Rejected ballots		16		
Majority		1094		
Turnout			39.3	−23.7
Conservative hold		Swing		

Selden
Party	Candidate	Votes	%	±%
Conservative	Roger Oakley	802	34.3	
Liberal Democrats	Jacqueline Cranefield	783	33.5	
Labour	Mike Barrett	504	21.5	
UKIP	Brian Head	246		
Rejected ballots		19		
Majority		19		
Turnout				−22.4
Conservative hold		Swing		

Tarring
Party	Candidate	Votes	%	±%
Liberal Democrats	Hazel Thorpe	1107		
Conservative	Nadeem Khan	701		
Labour	Peter Barnes	368		
UKIP	Shaune King	282		
Rejected ballots		19		
Majority		407		
Turnout			38.5	−27.5
Liberal Democrats hold		Swing		
