= Liberal Democrats =

Liberal Democrats may refer to:

- supporters of liberal democracy
- Liberal Democrats (UK), a political party in the United Kingdom
- Liberal Democratic Party (Australia), a political party in Australia, also known as Liberal Democrats
- left-liberals or social liberals in the Democratic Party (United States)
- Liberal Democrats (Italy), a political party in Italy
- European Liberal Democrats, a political party in Italy, also known as European LibDems
- Liberal Democratic Party (France), a political party in France
- Liberal Democrats (Germany), a political party in Germany
- Liberal Democrats (Sudan), a political party in Sudan
- Liberal Democratic Party (Belarus), a political party in Belarus, also known as Liberal Democrats
- Liberal Democrats (Belgium), a political party in Belgium
- Liberal Democratic Party (Japan), a political party in Japan, also known as Liberal Democrats
- Liberal Democratic Party (Netherlands), a political party in the Netherlands
- Liberal Democrats (Slovenia), a political party in Slovenia
- Liberal Democratic Party of Russia, a political party in Russia, also known as Liberal Democrats
- Liberal Democratic Party of Ukraine, a political party in Ukraine, also known as Liberal Democrats
- Croatian People's Party – Liberal Democrats, a political party in Croatia, sometimes shortened as Liberal Democrats
- Order of the Nation (political party), a political party in the Czech Republic formerly known as LiDem – Liberal Democrats

== See also ==
- List of Liberal Democratic parties
