= 2015 Worthing Borough Council election =

2015 UK local government election

- 7 May 2015

11 of the 37 seats to Worthing Borough Council 19 seats needed for a majority

	First party	Second party	Third party
Party	Conservative	Liberal Democrats	UKIP
Last election	27 seats, 36.2%	7 seats, 12.6%	1 seats, 28.9%
Seats before	28	6	2
Seats won	11	0	0
Seats after	30	4	2
Seat change	▲2	▼2	Steady
Popular vote	21,268	5,354	9,004
Percentage	44.8%	11.3%	19.0%
Swing	▲8.6%	▼1.3%	▼9.9%
	Fourth party	Fifth party
Party	Green	Labour
Last election	1 seats, 10.6%	0 seats, 11.7%
Seats won	0	0
Seats after	1	0
Seat change	Steady	Steady
Popular vote	4,456	7,347
Percentage	9.4%	15.5%
Swing	▼1.2%	▲3.8%
- Map showing the election results. Each ward had one seat up for election (bar Durrington and Northbrook).
Council control before election
Conservative
Council control after election
Conservative

The 2015 Worthing Borough Council election took place on 7 May 2015 to elect members of Worthing Borough Council in England. It was held on the same day as other local elections and the 2015 general election. The Conservative Party retained its control of the council, winning every seat that was up for election.

There was no local election in Durrington or Northbrook wards this year.

== Ward results ==
Broadwater
Party	Candidate	Votes	%	±%
Conservative	Nigel Morgan	1,809	41.0	+6.8
UKIP	Tony Anderson	915	20.7	−10.6
Labour	John Turley	778	17.6	+4.6
Liberal Democrats	John Apsey	272	10.9	−1.4
Green	Richard Battson	202	9.7	+0.5
Majority		894	20.3	+17.4
Turnout		2,207	63.7	+31.3%
Conservative gain from Liberal Democrats		Swing		

Castle
Party	Candidate	Votes	%	±%
Conservative	Roger Harman	1,490	37.6	+5.4
UKIP	Pauline James	1,029	25.9	−4.0
Labour	Ian Walker	633	16.0	+1.1
Liberal Democrats	Trudy Starling	592	14.9	−4.0
Green	Julian Warrick	222	5.6	+1.6
Majority		461	11.7	+9.5
Turnout		3,966	61.5	+26.4
Conservative hold		Swing		

Central
Party	Candidate	Votes	%	±%
Conservative	Clive Roberts	1,331	32.0	+6.1
Green	Daniel Parsonage	926	22.2	−4.1
Labour	Michelle Harfield	782	18.8	+3.2
UKIP	Trevor England	729	17.5	−6.6
Liberal Democrats	Chris Allen	395	9.5	+1.4
Majority		405	9.8	+10.2
Turnout		4,163	58.1	+26.3
Conservative hold		Swing		

Gaisford
Party	Candidate	Votes	%	±%
Conservative	Bryan Turner	1,922	43.8	+6.4
Labour	Joe Thornton	817	18.6	+5.3
UKIP	John Harwood	703	16.0	−6.9
Green	Rosemarie Turner	502	11.4	−4.4
Liberal Democrats	Dimitri Seirlis	300	10.0	−2.8
Majority		1,105	25.2	+9.8
Turnout		4,387	64.8	+30.5
Conservative hold		Swing		

Goring
Party	Candidate	Votes	%	±%
Conservative	Roy Barraclough	2,946	57.6	+9.1
UKIP	David Smith	853	16.7	−10.9
Labour	Margaret Harris	568	11.1	+0.8
Liberal Democrats	David Elford	437	8.5	+2.2
Green	Samuel Lovely	314	6.1	−0.8
Majority		2,093	40.7	+19.9
Turnout		5,118	73.5	+29.7
Conservative hold		Swing		

Heene
Party	Candidate	Votes	%	±%
Conservative	Joshua High	1,449	38.7	+4.7
Green	Stefan Sykes	802	21.4	−2.8
Labour	Richard Mulholland	604	16.1	+5.5
UKIP	Geoff Brown	599	16.0	−7.7
Liberal Democrats	Michael Cranefield	289	7.7	+0.2
Majority		647	17.3	+7.4
Turnout		3,743	58.7	+25.9
Conservative hold		Swing		

Marine
Party	Candidate	Votes	%	±%
Conservative	Paul Yallop	2,296	49.6	+6.0
UKIP	Kirk Dickenson	741	16.0	−11.1
Labour	Alex Wagstaff	663	14.3	+2.6
Liberal Democrats	Michael Finch	472	10.2	+2.8
Green	Katy Parsonage	455	9.8	−0.5
Majority		1,555	33.6	+17.1
Turnout		4,627	68.7	+29.8
Conservative hold		Swing		

Offington
Party	Candidate	Votes	%	±%
Conservative	Daniel Humphreys	2,749	58.3	+10.6
UKIP	John Strange	836	17.7	−13.1
Labour	Jed Smith	437	9.3	+1.9
Liberal Democrats	Pat Izod	410	8.7	+1.2
Green	Anne Weinhold	283	6.0	−0.3
Majority		1,913	40.6	+23.5
Turnout		4,715	72.3	+31.5
Conservative hold		Swing		

Salvington
Party	Candidate	Votes	%	±%
Conservative	Noel Atkins	2,397	49.9	+10.9
UKIP	Mike Jelliss	1,139	23.7	−14.5
Liberal Democrats	Jacqueline Cranefield	638	13.3	+6.4
Labour	Jill Guest	627	13.1	+4.0
Majority		1,258	26.2	+25.3
Turnout		4,801	66.9	+30.5
Conservative hold		Swing		

Selden
Party	Candidate	Votes	%	±%
Conservative	Alex Harman	1,415	36.8	+6.4
Labour	Mike Barrett	851	22.2	+4.3
UKIP	Graham Adams	706	18.4	−8.2
Liberal Democrats	Yvonne Leonard	439	11.4	−3.7
Green	Valerie Ellis	429	11.2	+1.1
Majority		564	14.6	+10.8
Turnout		3,840	62.2	+30.8
Conservative hold		Swing		

Tarring
Party	Candidate	Votes	%	±%
Conservative	Tom Wye	1,464	34.6	+13.8
Liberal Democrats	Hazel Thorpe	1,110	26.2	−5.4
UKIP	Adrian Price	754	17.8	−11.6
Labour	Jim Deen	587	13.9	+4.3
Green	Ross Johnson	321	7.6	−1.1
Majority		354	8.4	19.2
Turnout		4,236	65.8	+30.9
Conservative gain from Liberal Democrats		Swing		
