= 2019 Worthing Borough Council election =

2019 UK local government election

- 2 May 2019

11 of the 37 seats to Worthing Borough Council 19 seats needed for a majority

	First party	Second party	Third party
Party	Conservative	Labour	Liberal Democrats
Last election	29 seats, 45.9%	5 seats, 34.5%	2 seats, 13.4%
Seats won	5	5	1
Seats after	23	10	3
Seat change	▼6	▲5	▲1
Popular vote	9,499	8,063	3,850
Percentage	36.5%	31.0%	14.8%
Swing	▼9.4%	▼2.5%	▲1.4%
	Fourth party	Fifth party
Party	UKIP	Green
Last election	1 seat, 2.2%	0 seats, 4.1%
Seats won	0	0
Seats after	1	0
Seat change	Steady	Steady
Popular vote	1,871	2,581
Percentage	7.2%	9.9%
Swing	▲5.0%	▲5.8%
- Map showing the election results. Each ward had one seat up for election (bar Durrington and Northbrook).
Council control before election
Conservative
Council control after election
Conservative

The 2019 Worthing Borough Council election took place on 2 May 2019 to elect members of Worthing Borough Council. This was on the same day as other local elections. A third of the council was up for election, meaning a total of 11 councillors were elected from council's wards, there being no election in Durrington and Northbrook in this cycle.

== Council results ==
2019 Worthing Borough Council election
Party	Candidates						Votes		
Party	Stood	Elected	Gained	Unseated	Net	% of total	%	No.	Net %
Conservative	11	5	0	6	-6	45.5	36.5	9,499	-7.8
Labour	11	5	5	0	+5	45.5	31.0	8,063	+15.7
Liberal Democrats	11	1	1	0	+1	9	14.8	3,850	+2.9
Green	9	0	0	0	0	0	9.9	2,581	+0.1
UKIP	6	0	0	0	0	0	7.2	1,871	-11.6
Independent	1	0	0	0	0	0	0.565	147	N/A

== Ward results ==
=== Broadwater ward ===
Broadwater
Party	Candidate	Votes	%	±%
Labour	Dawn Smith	962	45.0	
Conservative	Nigel Morgan	671	31.3	
Green	Richard Battson	266	12.4	
Liberal Democrats	John Apsey	242	11.3	
Majority		191	13.7	
Turnout		2141	32.2	
Labour gain from Conservative		Swing		

=== Castle ward ===
Castle
Party	Candidate	Votes	%	±%
Conservative	Lionel Harman	693	35.4	
Labour	Samuel Theodoridi	369	18.8	
Liberal Democrats	Matt Hoyland	362	18.4	
UKIP	Stuart Field	311	15.9	
Green	Julian Warwick	225	11.5	
Majority		324	16.6	
Turnout		1960	28.9	
Conservative hold		Swing		

=== Central ward ===
Central
Party	Candidate	Votes	%	±%
Labour	Sally Smith	1,131	44.9	
Conservative	Diane Guest	627	24.9	
Green	Jo Paul	517	20.5	
Liberal Democrats	Christine Brown	243	9.7	
Majority		504	20.0	
Turnout		2518	33.1	
Labour gain from Conservative		Swing		

=== Gaisford ward ===
Gaisford
Party	Candidate	Votes	%	±%
Labour	Henna Chowdhury	1,213	47.0	
Conservative	Bryan Turner	951	36.8	
Liberal Democrats	Caroline Griffiths	418	16.2	
Majority		262	10.2	
Turnout		2582	37.5	
Labour gain from Conservative		Swing		

=== Goring ward ===
Goring
Party	Candidate	Votes	%	±%
Conservative	Roy Barraclough	1,295	49.1	
UKIP	Richard Bater	368	14.0	
Labour	Stephanie Powell	347	13.1	
Green	David Aherne	333	12.6	
Liberal Democrats	Cyril Cannings	296	11.2	
Majority		927	35.1	
Turnout		2639	38.6	
Conservative hold		Swing		

=== Heene ward ===
Heene
Party	Candidate	Votes	%	±%
Labour	Helen Silman	866	39.2	
Conservative	Gavin Poole	758	34.3	
Green	Joseph Pearce	277	12.5	
Liberal Democrats	Christine Allen	163	7.4	
Independent	Joshy High	147	6.6	
Majority		108	4.9	
Turnout		2211	34.7	
Labour gain from Conservative		Swing		

=== Marine ward ===
Marine
Party	Candidate	Votes	%	±%
Conservative	Tim Wills	1,140	41.0	
Labour	Samuel Baeza	907	32.6	
Green	Karen North	267	9.6	
UKIP	Sue Jelliss	234	8.4	
Liberal Democrats	Antony Brown	232	8.4	
Majority		233	8.4	
Turnout		2780	41.7	
Conservative hold		Swing		

=== Offington ward ===
Offington
Party	Candidate	Votes	%	±%
Conservative	Daniel Humphreys	1,260	53.2	
Liberal Democrats	Emma Norton	474	20.0	
Labour	Jon Roser	342	14.4	
UKIP	John Strange	291	12.3	
Majority		786	33.25	
Turnout		2367	36.8	
Conservative hold		Swing		

=== Salvington ward ===
Salvington
Party	Candidate	Votes	%	±%
Conservative	Noel Atkins	1,027	44.6	
UKIP	Michael Jelliss	431	18.7	
Labour	Emma Taylor	316	13.7	
Liberal Democrats	Keith Sunderland	284	12.3	
Green	Melanie Ling	245	10.6	
Majority		596	25.9	
Turnout		2,303	32.4	
Conservative hold		Swing		

=== Selden ward ===
Selden
Party	Candidate	Votes	%	±%
Labour	Carl Walker	1,098	48.0	
Conservative	Alex Harman	696	30.4	
Green	Madeleine Weaver	289	12.6	
Liberal Democrats	Yvonne Leonard	204	8.9	
Majority		402	17.6	
Turnout		2,287	36.8	
Labour gain from Conservative		Swing		

=== Tarring ward ===
Tarring
Party	Candidate	Votes	%	±%
Liberal Democrats	Martin McCabe	932	42.3	
Labour	Rosey Whorlow	492	22.3	
Conservative	Richard Nowak	381	17.3	
UKIP	Toby Brothers	236	10.7	
Green	Dominic Rhoden	164	7.4	
Majority		440	20.0	
Turnout		2,205	34.9	
Liberal Democrats gain from Conservative		Swing		

=== By-elections ===
==== Salvington ====
The Salvington by-election was triggered by the resignation of councillor Antony Baker, who had sat as an independent after being suspended by the Conservative Party shortly after his election in 2016.

Salvington: 12 December 2019
Party	Candidate	Votes	%	
Conservative	Richard Nowak	2,690	60.4	▼2.7
Liberal Democrats	Emma Norton	928	20.9	▲4.8
Labour	Gill Poole	832	18.7	▼2.1
Rejected ballots		34	0.8	
Majority		1762	39.6	
Turnout		4454	61.7	
Conservative hold		Swing		
