= 2018 Worthing Borough Council election =

2018 UK local government election

- 3 May 2018

13 of the 37 seats to Worthing Borough Council 19 seats needed for a majority

	First party	Second party	Third party
Leader	Daniel Humphreys	Rebecca Cooper	Robert Smytherman
Party	Conservative	Labour	Liberal Democrats
Leader's seat	Offington	Marine	Tarring
Last election	32 seats, 38.6%	0 seats, 20.3%	2 seats, 12.6%
Seats before	31	1	2
Seats won	8	4	1
Seats after	29	5	2
Seat change	▼2	▲4	Steady
Popular vote	13,150	9,869	3,826
Percentage	45.9%	34.5%	13.4%
Swing	▲7.3%	▲14.2%	▲0.8%
	Fourth party	Fifth party
Party	UKIP	Green
Last election	2 seats, 20.9%	1 seat, 7.6%
Seats won	0	0
Seats after	1	0
Seat change	▼1	▼1
Popular vote	617	1,927
Percentage	2.2%	4.1%
Swing	▼18.7%	▼3.5%
- Map showing the election results. Each ward had one seat up for election.
Council control before election
Conservative
Council control after election
Conservative

The 2018 Worthing Borough Council election took place on 3 May 2018 to elect members of Worthing Borough Council. This was on the same day as other local elections. A third of the council was up for election, meaning a total of 13 councillors were elected from all of the council's wards.

Despite suffering a net loss of two seats, the Conservative Party retained overall control of the council.

== Council results ==
2018 Worthing Borough Council election
Party	Candidates						Votes		
Party	Stood	Elected	Gained	Unseated	Net	% of total	%	No.	Net %
Conservative	13	8	1	3	-2	61.5	45.9	13,150	
Labour	13	4	4	0	+4	30.8	34.5	9,869	
Liberal Democrats	13	1	0	0	±0	7.7	13.4	3,826	
Green	8	0	0	1	-1	0.0	4.1	1,181	
UKIP	6	0	0	1	-1	0.0	2.2	617	

== Ward results ==
=== Broadwater ward ===
Broadwater
Party	Candidate	Votes	%	±%
Labour	Margaret Howard	1,026	47.6	+21.2
Conservative	Steve McKeown	836	38.8	+2.7
Liberal Democrats	John Apsey	229	10.6	−0.1
Green	Kate Sweeny	147	6.8	−1.7
Majority		190	8.8	
Turnout		2,155	31.6	
Labour gain from Conservative		Swing		

=== Castle ward ===
Castle
Party	Candidate	Votes	%	±%
Conservative	Karen Harman	864	41.8	+9.5
Liberal Democrats	Martin McCabe	531	25.7	+9.1
Labour	Samuel Theodoridi	453	21.9	+4.6
UKIP	Heba Saraway	123	5.9	−24.7
Green	Julian Warwick	97	4.7	−0.5
Majority		333	16.1	
Turnout		2,069	30.5	
Conservative hold		Swing	1.5	

=== Central ward ===
Central
Party	Candidate	Votes	%	±%
Labour	James Deen	1,534	56.7	+30.1
Conservative	Harvey Robinson	777	28.7	+0.5
Green	James Doyle	202	7.5	−11.0
Liberal Democrats	Christine Brown	184	6.8	−3.0
Majority		757	28.0	
Turnout		2,706	35.2	
Labour gain from Green		Swing		

=== Durrington ward ===
Durrington
Party	Candidate	Votes	%	±%
Conservative	Charles James	791	57.0	+21.8
Labour	Jillian Guest	296	21.3	+9.3
Liberal Democrats	Emma Norton	295	21.3	+0.5
Majority		495	35.7	
Turnout		1,387	31.0	
Conservative gain from UKIP		Swing		

=== Gaisford ward ===
Gaisford
Party	Candidate	Votes	%	±%
Conservative	Kevin Jenkins	1,002	41.9	+3.5
Labour	Joseph Thornton	950	39.7	+14.7
Liberal Democrats	Stephen Martin	222	9.3	−2.5
Green	Stephen Carleysmith	211	8.8	−0.8
Majority		52	2.2	
Turnout		2,390	34.0	
Conservative hold		Swing		

=== Goring ward ===
Goring
Party	Candidate	Votes	%	±%
Conservative	Nicola Waight	1,625	60.0	+8.3
Labour	Jane Cropper	561	20.7	+6.1
Liberal Democrats	Cyril Cannings	192	7.1	+1.1
Green	David Aherne	184	6.8	−0.7
UKIP	Richard Bater	144	5.3	−14.8
Majority		1,064	39.3	
Turnout		2,709	39.3	
Conservative hold		Swing		

=== Heene ward ===
Heene
Party	Candidate	Votes	%	±%
Labour	Richard Mulholland	1,029	45.3	+12.5
Conservative	Diane Guest	964	42.4	+6.0
Green	Joseph Pearce	139	6.1	−1.6
Liberal Democrats	Christine Allen	134	5.9	−0.1
Majority		65	2.9	
Turnout		2,273	35.2	
Labour gain from Conservative		Swing		

=== Marine ward ===
Marine
Party	Candidate	Votes	%	±%
Conservative	Edward Crouch	1,460	50.6	+5.4
Labour	Samuel Baeza	1,136	39.3	+19.8
Liberal Democrats	Caroline Griffiths	194	6.7	−3.5
UKIP	Barry Pinchen	94	3.3	−13.1
Majority		324	11.3	
Turnout		2,888	43.2	
Conservative hold		Swing		

=== Northbrook ward ===
Northbrook
Party	Candidate	Votes	%	±%
Conservative	Sean McDonald	497	51.1	+23.4
Labour	John Martin	268	27.5	+9.3
Liberal Democrats	Keith Sunderland	133	13.7	−8.8
UKIP	Stuart Field	75	7.7	−22.9
Majority		229	23.6	
Turnout		973	22.3	
Conservative hold		Swing		

=== Offington ward ===
Offington
Party	Candidate	Votes	%	±%
Conservative	Louise Murphy	1,452	63.8	
Labour	Bernard Eustice	496	21.8	
Liberal Democrats	Antony Brown	231	10.1	
UKIP	John Strange	93	4.1	
Majority		956	42.0	
Turnout		2,276	35.2	
Conservative hold		Swing		

=== Salvington ward ===
Salvington
Party	Candidate	Votes	%	±%
Conservative	Heather Mercer	1,396	62.5	
Labour	Helen Silman	461	20.6	
Liberal Democrats	Jacqueline Cranefield	356	15.9	
Majority		935	41.9	
Turnout		2,233	30.8	
Conservative hold		Swing		

=== Selden ward ===
Selden
Party	Candidate	Votes	%	±%
Labour	Michael Barrett	1,162	49.2	
Conservative	Callum Buxton	963	40.8	
Liberal Democrats	Yvonne Leonard	134	5.7	
Green	Constantine de Goguel	95	4.0	
Majority		199	8.4	
Turnout		2,360	37.4	
Labour gain from Conservative		Swing		

=== Tarring ward ===
Tarring
Party	Candidate	Votes	%	±%
Liberal Democrats	Robert Smytherman	991	44.9	
Conservative	Steven Peck	523	23.7	
Labour	Pauline Fraser	497	22.5	
Green	Joanna Ponto	106	4.8	
UKIP	Adrian Price	88	4.0	
Majority		468	21.2	
Turnout		2,207	34.1	
Liberal Democrats hold		Swing		
