= Hazel Rennie =

British anti-nuclear activist (died 2016)

- Born: 1927 or 1928; East Morton, West Yorkshire, England
- Died: 2016 (aged 88)
- Known for: Activism against nuclear weapons at Greenham Common and other peace activism
- Spouse: Jock Rennie

Hazel Rennie (1927/1928 – 2016) was a British peace activist who was a member of the Greenham Common Women's Peace Camp from 1982 and remained closely connected with it until its closure in December 2000. She was also active in the Women's International League for Peace and Freedom (WILPF).

== Early life and career ==
Rennie was the daughter of Clara Calvert, and grew up in East Morton in West Yorkshire, England, where her family worked in textile mills. She was the last of six children, and went to school locally, leaving at 14 to work in a munitions factory. From a young age she liked to write poetry and would sometimes do this rather than attend school. In the late 1940s she moved to Hove, East Sussex to work in a hospital, where at Christmas she would write and perform plays for the staff with her friend Kate Brodbin, who would also become a member of the WILPF. They poked fun at the hierarchy within the hospital, the new National Health Service and the government. She then joined the Women's Royal Air Force, through which she met Jock Rennie who was in the Royal Air Force, marrying in 1958. She and her four children travelled the world as her husband was posted to Sri Lanka, Cyprus, Singapore and Bahrain. They then returned to England and settled in Worthing, West Sussex.

== Activism ==
Rennie decided to go to Greenham Common after the December 1982 "Embrace the Base" action, when 30,000 women joined hands to encircle the RAF Greenham Common base, where US nuclear-armed cruise missiles were due to arrive in 1983. Around Christmas 1982 she announced her intention to go to Greenham to her husband and two sons and headed off by bus with a sleeping bag and a bottle of brandy. A carer in an old people's home, she could not stay long but she made frequent return visits.

She was often to be found welcoming newcomers to the camp, showing them to how things worked, and helping them to overcome shyness and feel comfortable. She was known for her enthusiasm and her curiosity about other women's lives, encouraging discussion on all issues. As Jenny Engledow has observed, Rennie's positive enthusiasm when she was at Greenham and, later, at the peace camp at the Atomic Weapons Establishment at Aldermaston, "created a warmth and feeling of belonging for many women that brought them back again and again". Rennie continued to write and read poems, particularly on peace topics, some of which would later be published.

Rennie was often arrested and was sent to Holloway women's prison on four occasions for refusing to pay fines for trespass. She carried out non-violent direct action despite being arthritic and partially blind. There were several camps around the base, named after colours, which could monitor the different entrances and exits. These also served to separate the women according to their political and spiritual views. At one time Rennie and a friend were badly beaten by two men while at a remote camp. She was admitted to hospital with two broken ribs, but continued to go back to the camp. As a result of her prison sentences, she began to get involved in activities in support of women prisoners who would rarely see their children, who they could lose if their fathers or other relatives were unable or unwilling to look after them while the women were in prison.

Rennie introduced many of the women at Greenham Common and Aldermaston to the Women's International League for Peace and Freedom. She attended WILPF's Congress in Sweden in 1983 and in 1987 was the UK WILPF president. After the closure of the Greenham Camp in 2000 she continued her involvement in WILPF, in the Worthing Campaign for Nuclear Disarmament (CND), and with "Worthing Against War", while continuing to visit the Aldermaston peace camp. She wrote and took part in a play called Putting Tony Blair on Trial, about the former UK prime minister's role in the Iraq War. The following year, she toured Worthing in a white boiler suit, asking if anyone knew where the former leader of Iraq, Saddam Hussein, had hidden his alleged weapons of mass destruction. Later, she would write letters appealing for the release of prisoners detained by the US in Guantánamo Bay detention camp, including one to the British prime minister, Gordon Brown, which many believe was instrumental in securing the release in 2007 of Brighton resident Omar Deghayes. She also called for the release of Shaker Aamer who was released to Britain in 2015. Rennie also stood unsuccessfully as a candidate of the Labour Party in local elections in Worthing.

== Death ==
Rennie died in 2016, aged 88, after a long illness. At her funeral, several of the women from Greenham Common spoke about how she had influenced their lives.
