= 2026 Worthing Borough Council election =

2026 English local government election

- 7 May 2026

13 out of 37 seats to Worthing Borough Council 19 seats needed for a majority
	First party	Second party	Third party
Leader	Sophie Cox		Richard Nowak
Party	Labour	Green	Conservative
Last election	26 seats, 45.1%	2 seats, 13.6%	9 seats, 31.8%
Seats before	21	2	9
Seats won	1	6	0
Seats after	15	8	6
Seat change	▼6	▲6	▼3
Popular vote	9,383	9,881	7,663
Percentage	22.5%	23.7%	18.4%
Swing	▼22.6%	▲10.1%	▼13.4%
	Fourth party	Fifth party	Sixth party
Leader	Luke Houghton (defeated)
Party	Reform	Independent	Liberal Democrats
Last election	Did not stand	Did not stand	0 seats, 9.5%
Seats before	2	3 (Note: The 3 Independent councillors sat in the Worthing Community Independents group.)	0
Seats won	5	0	1
Seats after	5	2	1
Seat change	▲3	▼1	▲1
Popular vote	11,219	Did not stand	3,588
Percentage	26.9%	Did not stand	8.6%
Swing	N/A	N/A	▼0.9%
- Winner of each seat at the 2026 Worthing Borough Council election.
Leader before election
Sophie Cox
Labour
Leader after election
Caroline Baxter
Labour
No overall control (Note: Labour minority.)

The 2026 Worthing Borough Council election was held on 7 May 2026, alongside the other local elections across the United Kingdom being held on the same day, to elect 13 of 37 members of Worthing Borough Council in West Sussex, England.

Prior to the election, the council was under Labour majority control. At this election the council went under no overall control. Labour remained the largest party, but fell four seats short of a majority. The incumbent leader of the council, Sophie Cox, stood down as leader after the election. Labour chose Caroline Baxter to be its new group leader instead. She was formally confirmed as the new leader of the council at the subsequent annual council meeting on 19 May 2026, leading a Labour minority administration.

== Summary ==
=== Background ===
In 2024, the Labour Party won majority control of the council. In January 2026, the council asked for the election to be postponed pending local government reorganisation. However it was rescheduled on 16 February 2026.

=== Council composition ===
After 2024 election		Before 2026 election	
Party	Seats	Party	Seats
Labour	26	Labour	21
Conservative	9	Conservative	9
Green	2	Green	2
Reform	0	Reform	2

Changes 2024–2026:

- May 2024: Margaret Howard (Labour), Hilary Schan (Labour), and Carl Walker (Labour) leave party to sit as independents
- July 2024: Beccy Cooper (Labour) resigns – by-election held September 2024
- August 2024: Richard Mulholland (Labour) resigns – by-election held October 2024
- September 2024: Thomas Taylor (Conservative) gains by-election from Labour
- October 2024: Luke Houghton (Conservative) gains by-election from Labour
- May 2025: Luke Houghton (Conservative) joins Reform
- November 2025: Charles James (Conservative) joins Reform

=== Election result ===
2026 Worthing Borough Council election
Party	This election				Full council			This election		
Party	Candidates	Seats	Net	Seats %	Other	Total	Total %	Votes	Votes %	+/−
Labour	13	1	▼6	7.7	14	15	42.9	9,383	22.5	–22.6
Green	13	6	▲6	46.2	2	8	22.9	9,881	23.7	+10.1
Conservative	13	0	▼3	0.0	6	6	17.1	7,663	18.4	–13.4
Reform	13	5	▲3	38.5	0	5	14.3	11,219	26.9	N/A
Independent	0	0	▼1	0.0	2	2	5.4	N/A (Note: Did not stand candidates.)	N/A	N/A
Liberal Democrats	13	1	▲1	7.7	0	1	2.9	3,588	8.6	–0.9

== Ward results ==
=== Broadwater ===
Broadwater
Party	Candidate	Votes	%	±%
Green	Jimi Taylor	1,065	33.5	+24.4
Reform	Lindsey Jackson	824	26.0	N/A
Labour	Tim Hicks	741	23.3	–35.5
Conservative	Christopher Moros	388	12.2	–12.6
Liberal Democrats	John Aspey	157	4.9	–2.3
Majority		241	7.5	N/A
Turnout		3,175	46.8	+16.2
Green gain from Independent				

=== Castle ===
Castle
Party	Candidate	Votes	%	±%
Reform	Lionel Harman	953	31.4	N/A
Labour	Ibsha Choudhury*	724	23.8	–23.2
Green	Soraya Hatami	515	17.0	+8.3
Conservative	Sean McDonald	511	16.8	–14.2
Liberal Democrats	Iona Harte	334	11.0	–2.3
Majority		229	7.6	N/A
Turnout		3,037	43.5	+15.8
Reform gain from Labour				

=== Central ===
Central
Party	Candidate	Votes	%	±%
Green	Natasha Davie	1,256	36.6	+24.9
Labour Co-op	Odul Bozkurt*	926	27.0	–32.2
Reform	Edmund Rooke	713	20.8	N/A
Conservative	Sam Mitchell-Innes	353	10.3	–12.1
Liberal Democrats	David Kingston	185	5.4	–1.3
Majority		330	9.6	N/A
Turnout		3,433	44.2	+13.6
Green gain from Labour Co-op		Swing	▲28.6	

=== Durrington ===
Durrington
Party	Candidate	Votes	%	±%
Reform	Charles James*	793	39.0	N/A
Conservative	Bradley Rowatt	452	22.2	–20.5
Labour	Nikki Joule	325	16.0	–23.4
Green	Luke Angel	266	13.1	+7.5
Liberal Democrats	Robin Rogers	196	9.6	–2.7
Majority		341	16.8	N/A
Turnout		2,032	45.1	+14.3
Reform hold				

=== Gaisford ===
Gaisford
Party	Candidate	Votes	%	±%
Green	Claire Hatfield	1,000	27.9	+17.7
Labour	Dale Overton*	966	26.9	–29.0
Reform	Stuart James	805	22.4	N/A
Liberal Democrats	Mathew Hoyland	310	8.6	+2.1
Conservative	Bryan Turner	506	14.1	–13.3
Majority		34	1.0	N/A
Turnout		3,587	51.7	+16.5
Green gain from Labour		Swing	▲23.4	

=== Goring ===
Goring
Party	Candidate	Votes	%	±%
Green	Jasmine Watkins	1,582	37.4	–18.4
Conservative	Kevin Jenkins*	1,183	27.9	–4.4
Reform	Jenni Price	1,077	25.4	N/A
Labour	Jo Bayly	268	6.3	–1.9
Liberal Democrats	Merlin Jones	124	2.9	±0.0
Majority		399	9.5	–14.0
Turnout		4,234	60.3	+15.8
Green gain from Conservative		Swing	▼7.0	

=== Heene ===
Heene
Party	Candidate	Votes	%	±%
Green	Debbie Woudman	1,014	32.7	+22.2
Labour	Anthony Squires	837	27.0	–29.3
Reform	Luke Houghton*	614	19.8	N/A
Conservative	Richard Smart	450	14.5	–11.7
Liberal Democrats	Jenny Blackie	184	5.9	–1.0
Majority		177	5.7	N/A
Turnout		3,099	47.4	+13.6
Green gain from Reform		Swing	▲25.8	

=== Marine ===
Marine
Party	Candidate	Votes	%	±%
Labour	Martin McCabe	1,295	34.9	–21.1
Conservative	Sally Nowak	868	23.4	–7.7
Reform	Sophie Fatehnia	792	21.3	N/A
Green	Jamie MacMillan	557	15.0	+7.6
Liberal Democrats	Trudi Starling	201	5.4	–0.2
Majority		427	11.5	–13.4
Turnout		3,713	55.8	+15.4
Labour hold		Swing	▼6.7	

=== Northbrook ===
Northbrook
Party	Candidate	Votes	%	±%
Reform	Rob Venn	719	33.7	N/A
Labour	Mike Barrett*	470	22.1	–25.8
Conservative	Russ Cochran	404	19.0	–19.2
Green	Alice Pimley	314	14.7	+8.7
Liberal Democrats	Nicholas Wiltshire	224	10.5	+2.9
Majority		249	11.6	N/A
Turnout		2,131	37.6	+12.6
Reform gain from Labour				

=== Offington ===
Offington
Party	Candidate	Votes	%	±%
Reform	Jeremy Carter	1,134	32.3	N/A
Conservative	Nigel Morgan*	1,066	30.4	–22.3
Labour	Liz Nicholson	605	17.2	–15.6
Green	Stephen Rhodes	421	12.0	+4.2
Liberal Democrats	Sarah Waghorn	284	8.1	+1.3
Majority		68	1.9	N/A
Turnout		3,510	54.1	+17.3
Reform gain from Conservative				

=== Salvington ===
Salvington
Party	Candidate	Votes	%	±%
Reform	Karen Harman	1,300	37.2	N/A
Conservative	Paisley Thomson	863	24.7	–23.1
Labour	Peter Barnes	560	16.0	–19.1
Green	Polly McGillivray	444	12.7	+5.6
Liberal Democrats	Emma Norton	328	9.4	–0.6
Majority		437	12.5	N/A
Turnout		3,495	49.3	+15.2
Reform gain from Conservative				

=== Selden ===
Selden
Party	Candidate	Votes	%	±%
Green	Katie Thornton	965	31.7	+22.3
Labour	Joe Thornton	883	29.0	–28.1
Reform	Steven Jackson	709	23.3	N/A
Conservative	John Salisbury	314	10.3	–15.5
Liberal Democrats	Christine Brown	174	5.7	–2.0
Majority		82	2.7	N/A
Turnout		3,045	49.7	+16.2
Green gain from Labour		Swing	▲25.2	

=== Tarring ===
Tarring
Party	Candidate	Votes	%	±%
Liberal Democrats	Hazel Thorpe	887	27.4	–6.4
Reform	Catherine Davies	786	24.2	N/A
Labour Co-op	Rita Garner*	783	24.1	–20.5
Green	Cloe Grampa	482	14.9	+8.2
Conservative	Keith Bickers	305	9.4	–5.5
Majority		101	3.2	N/A
Turnout		3,243	50.7	+14.7
Liberal Democrats gain from Labour				
