= Greater Brighton City Region =

Proto-combined authority in England

- The constituent districts of the city region within South East England
- Coordinates: 50°50′N 0°09′W
- Sovereign state: United Kingdom
- Constituent country: England
- Historic county: Sussex
- Ceremonial county: East Sussex; West Sussex
- Established: 2014
- Principal areas: List: Adur; Arun; Brighton and Hove; Crawley; Lewes; Mid Sussex; Worthing

Area
  - Total: 407 sq mi (1,054 km^{2})

Population (2011)
  - Total: 932,500
  - Density: 2,291/sq mi (884.7/km^{2})

The Greater Brighton City Region is an area in the south of England centred on Brighton and Hove, incorporating seven local government districts in East Sussex and West Sussex. The Greater Brighton Economic Board was created in April 2014 to oversee a 6-year programme of development and investment within the area, which as of as of 2021 has about one million people.

== Economic board membership ==
The city region was initially formed from five local authorities (Brighton and Hove, Mid Sussex, Worthing, Lewes and the Adur district), together with the South Downs National Park, the University of Sussex, the University of Brighton and the Greater Brighton Metropolitan College. The city region was subsequently extended to include Crawley and Gatwick Airport on 6 February 2018 and Arun in 2019. The chair of the board is elected from amongst the local authority representatives on an annual basis, the current chair of the board is Councillor Bella Sankey.

Colour key (for political parties): Conservative Green Labour Lib Dem Non-political

Constituent membership
Name	Nominating authority	Position within nominating authority	Year Joined
Neil Parkin	Adur	Leader of the Council	2014
Matt Stanley	Arun	Leader of the Council	2019
Bella Sankey	Brighton and Hove City Council	Leader of the Council	2014
Steve Davis	Brighton and Hove City Council	Leader of the Opposition	2020
Michael Jones	Crawley	Leader of the Council	2018
Zoe Nicholson	Lewes	Leader of the Council	2014
Robert Eggleston	Mid Sussex	Leader of the Council	2014
Beccy Cooper	Worthing	Leader of the Council	2014
Education providers
Debbie Keeling	University of Sussex	Deputy pro-vice-chancellor for knowledge exchange	2014
Debra Humphris	University of Brighton	Vice-chancellor	2014
Dan Power	Chichester College Group	Chief commercial officer	2014
Business partnership and other bodies
Andrew Swayne	Adur & Worthing Business Partnership	Chairman	2014
Dean Orgill	Brighton & Hove Economic Partnership	Chairman	2014
Trevor Beattie	South Downs National Park Authority	Chief executive	2014

== Economy ==
In 2019 the city region was seen to support over 500,000 jobs and had a net worth of £23 billion. Creative industries worth more than £1.5 billion in the city region, with Brighton and Hove and Crawley boroughs being particular key areas. In its first six years of running the Economic Board was reported to have attracted £160 million of investment to the city region.

== Demographics ==
Population of local authority areas in the Greater Brighton City Region (census data)
Name	Notable settlements	1991	2001	2011	2021
Adur	Shoreham-by-Sea, Lancing, Southwick	58,500	59,700	61,200	64,500
Arun	Arundel, Bognor Regis, Littlehampton	130,500	141,000	149,500	164,800
Brighton and Hove	Brighton, Hove	240,500	249,900	273,300	277,200
Crawley	Crawley	88,300	100,400	106,600	118,500
Lewes	Lewes, Newhaven, Peacehaven, Seaford, Telscombe	88,200	92,200	97,500	99,900
Mid Sussex	Burgess Hill, East Grinstead, Haywards Heath	124,000	127,400	139,800	152,600
Worthing	Worthing	97,200	97,700	104,600	111,400
Total		827,200	868,300	932,500	988,900
