= 1976 Adur District Council election =

1976 UK local government election

| ← 1973 | 6 May 1976 | 1979 → |

All 37 seats to Adur District Council 19 seats needed for a majority
| | First party | Second party | Third party |
|---|---|---|---|
| Party | Liberal | Conservative | Labour |
| Seats won | 17 | 16 | 2 |
| Seat change | ▲1 | ▲3 | ▼3 |
Majority party before election
No Overall Control
Majority party after election
No Overall Control

Elections to the Adur District Council were held on 6 May 1976, with the entire council up for election. The two councillors in Marine elected as Residents were defending their seats as Independents. Overall turnout was recorded at 51.8%.

The election resulted in the council remaining under no overall control.

== Election result ==
Adur District Council Election Result 1976
| Party | Seats | Gains | Losses | Net gain/loss | Seats % | Votes % | Votes | +/− |
|---|---|---|---|---|---|---|---|---|
| Liberal | 17 | 4 | 3 | +1 | 45.9 | 36.2 | 8,392 | +6.3 |
| Conservative | 16 | 4 | 1 | +3 | 43.2 | 44.8 | 10,369 | +1.8 |
| Labour | 2 | 1 | 4 | -3 | 5.4 | 15.5 | 3,586 | -4.9 |
| Residents | 2 | 0 | 0 | 0 | 5.4 | 3.5 | 816 | +0.2 |

This resulted in the following composition of the council:

| Party | Previous council | New council |
|---|---|---|
| Liberal | 16 | 17 |
| Conservative | 13 | 16 |
| Labour | 5 | 2 |
| Independent Residents | 2 | 2 |
| Independent | 1 | 0 |
| Total | 37 | 37 |
| Working majority | -5 | -3 |

== Ward results ==
+/- figures represent changes from the last time these wards were contested.

Marine (2422)
| Party | Candidate | Votes | % | ±% |
|---|---|---|---|---|
| Independent | Warner B. Ms. | 816 | 63.3 | +5.9 |
| Independent | James P. Ms. | 802 | | |
| Conservative | Speight J. | 339 | 26.3 | −10.2 |
| Conservative | Maltby C. | 329 | | |
| Liberal | Brook D. Ms. | 85 | 6.6 | +6.6 |
| Liberal | Craig M. | 71 | | |
| Labour | Greig P. Ms. | 49 | 3.8 | −2.3 |
| Majority | | 477 | 37.0 | +16.1 |
| Turnout | | 1,289 | 53.2 | +4.0 |
| Independent hold | | Swing | | |
| Independent hold | | Swing | +8.0 | |

No. 1 (Shoreham: Buckingham) (3333)
| Party | Candidate | Votes | % | ±% |
|---|---|---|---|---|
| Conservative | Elliott I.R.W. | 1,065 | 65.0 | +10.2 |
| Conservative | Gumbrell P. | 1,064 | | |
| Liberal | Conway E. | 475 | 29.0 | −10.2 |
| Liberal | Arscott K. | 440 | | |
| Labour | Snowden H. | 98 | 6.0 | +0.0 |
| Majority | | 590 | 36.0 | +20.4 |
| Turnout | | 1,638 | 49.5 | +11.4 |
| Conservative hold | | Swing | | |
| Conservative hold | | Swing | +10.2 | |

No. 2 (Shoreham: Kingston Buci) (2565)
| Party | Candidate | Votes | % | ±% |
|---|---|---|---|---|
| Liberal | Little S. | 562 | 43.7 | +43.7 |
| Liberal | Russell G. | 511 | | |
| Conservative | Morris H. Ms. | 455 | 35.4 | +2.8 |
| Conservative | Rocker E. Ms. | 409 | | |
| Labour | Spence M. Ms. | 269 | 20.9 | −46.5 |
| Labour | Whipp B. | 261 | | |
| Majority | | 107 | 8.3 | −26.4 |
| Turnout | | 1,286 | 50.7 | +10.6 |
| Liberal gain from Labour | | Swing | | |
| Liberal gain from Labour | | Swing | +23.2 | |

No. 3 (Shoreham: Kingston St.Julians) (2957)
| Party | Candidate | Votes | % | ±% |
|---|---|---|---|---|
| Conservative | Smith M. | 587 | 39.5 | −11.6 |
| Liberal | Swatheridge W. | 576 | 38.7 | +38.7 |
| Conservative | Divers A. | 568 | | |
| Liberal | White J. | 528 | | |
| Labour | Greig P. | 324 | 21.8 | −27.1 |
| Labour | Porter B. | 288 | | |
| Majority | | 11 | 0.7 | −1.5 |
| Turnout | | 1,487 | 52.4 | +5.7 |
| Conservative hold | | Swing | | |
| Liberal gain from Labour | | Swing | +25.1 | |

No. 5 (Shoreham: St. Marys) (2100)
| Party | Candidate | Votes | % | ±% |
|---|---|---|---|---|
| Conservative | Richards F. Ms. | 577 | 53.9 | +4.1 |
| Conservative | Potter E. | 519 | | |
| Liberal | Wright G. Ms. | 354 | 33.1 | −6.8 |
| Liberal | Goldsmith P. | 303 | | |
| Labour | Ruff M. | 140 | 13.1 | +2.7 |
| Labour | Whipp L. Ms. | 139 | | |
| Majority | | 223 | 20.8 | +10.9 |
| Turnout | | 1,071 | 50.7 | +1.5 |
| Conservative hold | | Swing | | |
| Conservative hold | | Swing | +5.4 | |

No. 6 (Shoreham: St. Nicholas) (2242)
| Party | Candidate | Votes | % | ±% |
|---|---|---|---|---|
| Conservative | McNeill A. | 638 | 47.4 | −0.8 |
| Liberal | Robinson J. | 601 | 44.7 | +2.1 |
| Conservative | Robbins W. | 596 | | |
| Liberal | Jewiss A. | 553 | | |
| Labour | Cousin E. | 106 | 7.9 | −1.3 |
| Majority | | 37 | 2.8 | −2.9 |
| Turnout | | 1,345 | 59.5 | +12.8 |
| Conservative hold | | Swing | | |
| Liberal gain from Conservative | | Swing | +1.4 | |

No. 7 (Southwick: Central) (2054)
| Party | Candidate | Votes | % | ±% |
|---|---|---|---|---|
| Conservative | Wey G. | 671 | 57.8 | +10.8 |
| Conservative | Coghlan J. | 648 | | |
| Liberal | Williams H. | 251 | 21.6 | +21.6 |
| Liberal | Andrews M. | 239 | | |
| Labour | Barnard I. | 238 | 20.5 | −6.1 |
| Labour | Livingston M. | 218 | | |
| Majority | | 420 | 36.2 | +15.7 |
| Turnout | | 1,160 | 57.4 | −8.5 |
| Conservative hold | | Swing | | |
| Conservative hold | | Swing | -5.4 | |

No. 8 (Southwick: Fishergate) (1249)
| Party | Candidate | Votes | % | ±% |
|---|---|---|---|---|
| Labour | Boreham L. | 285 | 42.9 | +42.9 |
| Conservative | Dunn R. | 241 | 36.2 | −7.1 |
| Liberal | Cooper M. | 139 | 20.9 | +20.9 |
| Majority | | 44 | 6.6 | −6.7 |
| Turnout | | 665 | 53.8 | +3.0 |
| Labour gain from Independent | | Swing | +25.0 | |

No. 9 (Southwick: North) (2379)
| Party | Candidate | Votes | % | ±% |
|---|---|---|---|---|
| Conservative | Hale D. | 595 | 46.5 | −3.4 |
| Conservative | Greenyer J. | 574 | | |
| Labour | Clark R. | 403 | 31.5 | −18.6 |
| Labour | Bickers H. | 390 | | |
| Liberal | Taylor L. | 281 | 22.0 | +22.0 |
| Liberal | Gadsby P. Ms. | 268 | | |
| Majority | | 192 | 15.0 | +14.8 |
| Turnout | | 1,279 | 56.9 | +6.3 |
| Conservative gain from Labour | | Swing | | |
| Conservative hold | | Swing | +7.6 | |

No. 10 (Southwick: South) (985)
| Party | Candidate | Votes | % | ±% |
|---|---|---|---|---|
| Labour | Hobbis J. | 337 | 58.8 | −5.6 |
| Conservative | Kirkhope J. Ms. | 171 | 29.8 | −5.7 |
| Liberal | King M. Ms. | 65 | 11.3 | +11.3 |
| Majority | | 166 | 29.0 | +0.1 |
| Turnout | | 573 | 59.3 | +3.4 |
| Labour hold | | Swing | +0.0 | |

No. 11 (Southwick: West) (2449)
| Party | Candidate | Votes | % | ±% |
|---|---|---|---|---|
| Conservative | Barber R. | 765 | 62.1 | −0.4 |
| Conservative | Sweet I. Ms. | 761 | | |
| Liberal | Symonds A. | 252 | 20.5 | +20.5 |
| Liberal | Deedman J. Ms. | 251 | | |
| Labour | Munnery D. | 214 | 17.4 | −20.1 |
| Majority | | 513 | 41.7 | +16.7 |
| Turnout | | 1,231 | 51.1 | +0.8 |
| Conservative hold | | Swing | | |
| Conservative hold | | Swing | -10.4 | |

No. 12 (Lancing: East) (4554)
| Party | Candidate | Votes | % | ±% |
|---|---|---|---|---|
| Liberal | Deedman D. | 1,046 | 47.2 | −8.2 |
| Liberal | Sherlock M. Ms. | 1,032 | | |
| Liberal | Isherwood D. Ms. | 1,009 | | |
| Liberal | Allen C. Ms. | 1,009 | | |
| Conservative | Bailey M. | 898 | 40.6 | +4.6 |
| Conservative | Melvey T. | 846 | | |
| Conservative | Chipperfield K. | 839 | | |
| Conservative | Collins M. | 833 | | |
| Labour | Power J. Ms. | 270 | 12.2 | +3.6 |
| Labour | Harwood J. Ms. | 235 | | |
| Majority | | 148 | 6.7 | −12.8 |
| Turnout | | 2,214 | 48.4 | −0.3 |
| Liberal hold | | Swing | | |
| Liberal hold | | Swing | | |
| Liberal hold | | Swing | | |
| Liberal hold | | Swing | -6.4 | |

No. 13 (Lancing: West) (4435)
| Party | Candidate | Votes | % | ±% |
|---|---|---|---|---|
| Conservative | Burley Y. Ms. | 1,060 | 47.2 | +3.4 |
| Conservative | Kemp C. | 983 | | |
| Conservative | Stepney L. Ms. | 971 | | |
| Conservative | Thompson G. | 941 | | |
| Liberal | Brooks J. | 903 | 40.2 | −4.3 |
| Liberal | Baird D. | 826 | | |
| Liberal | Hartman E. Ms. | 794 | | |
| Liberal | Walters J. Ms. | 768 | | |
| Labour | Harwood R. | 282 | 12.6 | +1.0 |
| Labour | Price A. | 281 | | |
| Labour | Cruse D. | 255 | | |
| Labour | Jacques W. | 251 | | |
| Majority | | 157 | 7.0 | +6.3 |
| Turnout | | 2,245 | 49.9 | +7.6 |
| Conservative gain from Liberal | | Swing | | |
| Conservative hold | | Swing | | |
| Conservative gain from Liberal | | Swing | | |
| Conservative gain from Liberal | | Swing | +3.8 | |

No. 14 (Lancing: North) (4717)
| Party | Candidate | Votes | % | ±% |
|---|---|---|---|---|
| Liberal | Robinson C. Ms. | 1,338 | 50.1 | −6.5 |
| Liberal | Griffiths Y. Ms. | 1,200 | | |
| Liberal | Ghose D. Ms. | 1,171 | | |
| Liberal | Swadling M. | 1,142 | | |
| Conservative | Wilkinson F. | 1,078 | 40.3 | +6.1 |
| Conservative | Floyd J. | 1,009 | | |
| Conservative | Hussey D. | 977 | | |
| Conservative | Dixon J. Ms. | 975 | | |
| Labour | Goddard F. | 256 | 9.6 | +0.4 |
| Majority | | 260 | 9.7 | −12.7 |
| Turnout | | 2,672 | 54.0 | +8.7 |
| Liberal hold | | Swing | | |
| Liberal hold | | Swing | | |
| Liberal hold | | Swing | | |
| Liberal hold | | Swing | -6.3 | |

No. 15 (Sompting) (6568)
| Party | Candidate | Votes | % | ±% |
|---|---|---|---|---|
| Liberal | Charlton J. | 1,464 | 48.7 | −17.1 |
| Liberal | Cheal J. | 1,461 | | |
| Liberal | Green B. | 1,431 | | |
| Liberal | Underwood J. | 1,419 | | |
| Liberal | Burridge B. | 1,418 | | |
| Conservative | Bacon I. | 1,229 | 40.9 | +6.6 |
| Conservative | Lodge R. | 1,197 | | |
| Conservative | Moynan T. | 1,149 | | |
| Conservative | Gristwood R. | 1,145 | | |
| Conservative | Robinson E. | 1,135 | | |
| Labour | Burns F. | 315 | 10.5 | +10.5 |
| Labour | Forbes P. | 279 | | |
| Labour | Tufnell C. Ms. | 263 | | |
| Labour | Message D. | 257 | | |
| Labour | Tufnell C. | 255 | | |
| Majority | | 235 | 7.8 | −23.8 |
| Turnout | | 3,008 | 47.5 | +11.6 |
| Liberal hold | | Swing | | |
| Liberal hold | | Swing | | |
| Liberal hold | | Swing | | |
| Liberal hold | | Swing | | |
| Liberal hold | | Swing | -11.8 | |
