= 1973 Adur District Council election =

1973 UK local government election

← 1972	7 June 1973	1976 →

All 37 seats to Adur District Council 19 seats needed for a majority
	First party	Second party	Third party
Party	Liberal	Conservative	Labour
Seats won	16	13	5
Seat change	Steady	Steady	Steady
Majority party before election
No Overall Control
Majority party after election
No Overall Control

The first elections to the newly created Adur District Council established by the Local Government Act 1972 in England and Wales were held 7 June 1973. Overall turnout was recorded at 46.6%.

The election resulted in no overall control.

== Election result ==
Adur District Council Election Result 1973
Party	Seats	Gains	Losses	Net gain/loss	Seats %	Votes %	Votes	+/−
Liberal	16	0	0	0	43.2	29.9	5,961	N/A
Conservative	13	0	0	0	35.1	43.0	8,589	N/A
Labour	5	0	0	0	13.5	20.4	4,072	N/A
Residents	2	0	0	0	5.4	3.3	653	N/A
Independent	1	0	0	0	2.7	3.5	688	N/A

This resulted in the following composition of the council:

Party	New council
Liberal	16
Conservative	13
Labour	5
Independent Residents	2
Independent	1
Total	37
Working majority	-5

== Ward results ==
Marine (2315)
Party	Candidate	Votes	%	±%
Residents	James P. Ms.	653	57.4	N/A
Residents	Warner B. Ms.	648		
Conservative	Robbins W.	415	36.5	N/A
Conservative	Moseley P.	378		
Labour	Harwood J. Ms.	70	6.2	N/A
Majority			20.9	N/A
Turnout			49.2	N/A
Residents win (new seat)				
Residents win (new seat)				

No. 1 (Shoreham: Buckingham) (2835)
Party	Candidate	Votes	%	±%
Conservative	Elliott I.R.W.	592	54.8	N/A
Conservative	Hurrell C.	563		
Liberal	Boustead T.	423	39.2	N/A
Liberal	Brook D. Ms.	421		
Labour	Knee G.	65	6.0	N/A
Majority			15.6	N/A
Turnout			38.1	N/A
Conservative win (new seat)				
Conservative win (new seat)				

No. 2 (Shoreham: Kingston Buci) (2583)
Party	Candidate	Votes	%	±%
Labour	Colquhoun M. Ms.	698	67.4	N/A
Labour	Mitchell C.	625		
Conservative	Ransom A.	338	32.6	N/A
Conservative	Richings C.	321		
Majority			34.8	N/A
Turnout			40.1	N/A
Labour win (new seat)				
Labour win (new seat)				

No. 3 (Shoreham: Kingston St.Julians) (2746)
Party	Candidate	Votes	%	±%
Conservative	Carr G.	655	51.1	N/A
Labour	White J.	627	48.9	N/A
Conservative	Chipperfield K.	620		
Labour	Harwood R.	595		
Majority			2.2	N/A
Turnout			46.7	N/A
Conservative win (new seat)				
Labour win (new seat)				

No. 5 (Shoreham: St. Marys) (2128)
Party	Candidate	Votes	%	±%
Conservative	Richards F. Ms.	521	49.8	N/A
Conservative	Potter E.	439		
Liberal	Blackman G.	417	39.9	N/A
Liberal	Swatheridge W.	408		
Labour	Watson A.	108	10.3	N/A
Majority			9.9	N/A
Turnout			49.2	N/A
Conservative win (new seat)				
Conservative win (new seat)				

No. 6 (Shoreham: St. Nicholas) (2288)
Party	Candidate	Votes	%	±%
Conservative	Page F.	516	48.3	N/A
Conservative	Smith M.	502		
Liberal	Symonds A.	455	42.6	N/A
Liberal	King M. Ms.	445		
Labour	Mitchell R. Ms.	98	9.2	N/A
Majority			5.7	N/A
Turnout			46.7	N/A
Conservative win (new seat)				
Conservative win (new seat)				

No. 7 (Southwick: Central) (1981)
Party	Candidate	Votes	%	±%
Conservative	Wey G.	614	47.0	N/A
Conservative	Coghlan J.	505		
Labour	Clark R.	347	26.6	N/A
Independent	Divers B.	344	26.4	N/A
Labour	Kenward E. Ms.	302		
Majority			20.4	N/A
Turnout			65.9	N/A
Conservative win (new seat)				
Conservative win (new seat)				

No. 8 (Southwick: Fishergate) (1194)
Party	Candidate	Votes	%	±%
Independent	Sharman E.	344	56.7	N/A
Conservative	Dunn R.	263	43.3	N/A
Majority			13.4	N/A
Turnout			50.8	N/A
Independent win (new seat)				

No. 9 (Southwick: North) (2463)
Party	Candidate	Votes	%	±%
Labour	Moon K.	625	50.1	N/A
Conservative	Newman J. Ms.	622	49.9	N/A
Conservative	Joyce V. Ms.	617		
Labour	Boreham L.	566		
Majority			0.2	N/A
Turnout			50.6	N/A
Labour win (new seat)				
Conservative win (new seat)				

No. 10 (Southwick: South) (1051)
Party	Candidate	Votes	%	±%
Labour	Hobbis J.	379	64.5	N/A
Conservative	Gristwood R.	209	35.5	N/A
Majority			28.9	N/A
Turnout			55.9	N/A
Labour win (new seat)				

No. 11 (Southwick: West) (2486)
Party	Candidate	Votes	%	±%
Conservative	Barber R.	782	62.5	N/A
Conservative	Sweet I. Ms.	778		
Labour	Berry P.	469	37.5	N/A
Labour	Moon J. Ms.	412		
Majority			25.0	N/A
Turnout			50.3	N/A
Conservative win (new seat)				
Conservative win (new seat)				

No. 12 (Lancing: East) (4364)
Party	Candidate	Votes	%	±%
Liberal	Peter Bartram	1,178	55.5	N/A
Liberal	Brooks J.	982		
Liberal	Sherlock M. Ms.	936		
Liberal	Hamblin C.	896		
Conservative	Wilkinson F.	763	35.9	N/A
Conservative	Lane A. Ms.	681		
Conservative	Ball S.	663		
Labour	Waters R.	183	8.6	N/A
Labour	Lichfield S.	181		
Majority			19.5	N/A
Turnout			48.7	N/A
Liberal win (new seat)				
Liberal win (new seat)				
Liberal win (new seat)				
Liberal win (new seat)				

No. 13 (Lancing: West) (4422)
Party	Candidate	Votes	%	±%
Liberal	Hills D.	833	44.5	N/A
Conservative	Burley Y. Ms.	820	43.9	N/A
Liberal	Baird D.	820		
Liberal	Burt R.	816		
Conservative	Trickey M. Ms.	815		
Liberal	Swadling M.	796		
Conservative	Snowdon R. Ms.	790		
Conservative	Collins M.	755		
Labour	Barnes B. Ms.	217	11.6	N/A
Labour	Barnes C.	212		
Labour	Ford M.	199		
Majority			0.7	N/A
Turnout			42.3	N/A
Liberal win (new seat)				
Conservative win (new seat)				
Liberal win (new seat)				
Liberal win (new seat)				

No. 14 (Lancing: North) (4493)
Party	Candidate	Votes	%	±%
Liberal	Robinson C. Ms.	1,152	56.6	N/A
Liberal	Robinson J.	1,149		
Liberal	Kimmins A.	1,067		
Liberal	Leeds J.	1,023		
Conservative	Passmore R.	697	34.3	N/A
Conservative	Potter D.	634		
Conservative	Hussey D.	621		
Conservative	Plummer D. Ms.	598		
Labour	Gatland L. Ms.	186	9.1	N/A
Labour	Gatland J.	183		
Labour	Kelly M. Ms.	174		
Labour	Kelly P.	156		
Majority			22.4	N/A
Turnout			45.3	N/A
Liberal win (new seat)				
Liberal win (new seat)				
Liberal win (new seat)				
Liberal win (new seat)				

No. 15 (Sompting) (6373)
Party	Candidate	Votes	%	±%
Liberal	Burridge B.	1,503	65.8	N/A
Liberal	Green B.	1,424		
Liberal	Charlton J.	1,415		
Liberal	Cheal J.	1,408		
Liberal	Nicholls B.	1,331		
Conservative	Sparkes E. Ms.	782	34.2	N/A
Conservative	Beasley E. Ms.	757		
Conservative	Garnham R. Ms.	726		
Majority			31.6	N/A
Turnout			35.9	N/A
Liberal win (new seat)				
Liberal win (new seat)				
Liberal win (new seat)				
Liberal win (new seat)				
Liberal win (new seat)				
