= 2026 Adur District Council election =

2026 English local government election

- 7 May 2026

14 out of 29 seats to Adur District Council 15 seats needed for a majority
- Registered: 49,003
- Turnout: 23,024; 47.0%
	First party	Second party	Third party
Leader	Jeremy Gardner	None
Party	Labour	Reform	Independent
Last election	17 seats, 48.5%	Did not stand	2 seats, 6.7%
Seats before	17	0	4
Seats won	5	6	2
Seats after	17	6	3
Seat change	Steady	▲6	▼4
Popular vote	5,871	6,700	2,138
Percentage	25.7%	29.3%	9.3%
Swing	▼22.8%	N/A	▲2.6%
	Fourth party	Fifth party
Leader		Neil Parkin
Party	Green	Conservative
Last election	2 seats, 12.9%	8 seats, 28.4%
Seats before	2	3
Seats won	1	0
Seats after	2	1
Seat change	Steady	▼2
Popular vote	4,213	2,601
Percentage	18.4%	11.4%
Swing	▲5.5%	▼17.0%
- Winner of each seat at the 2026 Adur District Council election.
Leader before election
Jeremy Gardner
Labour
Leader after election
Jeremy Gardner
Labour

The 2026 Adur District Council election was held on 7 May 2026, alongside the other local elections across the United Kingdom being held on the same day, to elect 14 of 29 members of Adur District Council in West Sussex, England.

Labour retained its majority on the council at this election.

== Summary ==
=== Background ===
In 2024, the Labour Party won majority control of the council. In January 2026, the council asked for the election to be postponed pending local government reorganisation. However it was rescheduled on 16 February 2026.

=== Council composition ===
After 2024 election		Before 2026 election	
Party	Seats	Party	Seats
Labour	17	Labour	17
Conservative	8	Conservative	2
Green	2	Green	2
Independent	2	Independent	8

Changes 2024–2026:

- July 2024: Steve Neocleous (Conservative) leaves party to sit as an independent
- April 2025: Nigel Jenner (Labour) dies – by-election held June 2025
- June 2025: Kate Davis (Labour) wins by-election
- November 2025: Paul Mansfield (Conservative) leaves party to sit as an independent
- February 2026: Andy McGreggor, Neil Parkin, Carson Albury and Carol Albury leave the Conservative Party, and try to defect to Reform, but are refused entry. They subsequently sit as independents.

=== Election result ===
2026 Adur District Council election
Party	This election				Full council			This election		
Party	Candidates	Seats	Net	Seats %	Other	Total	Total %	Votes	Votes %	+/−
Labour	{{{candidates}}}	5	Steady	35.7	12	17	58.6	5,871	25.7	–22.8
Reform	{{{candidates}}}	6	▲6	42.9	0	6	20.7	6,700	29.3	N/A
Independent	{{{candidates}}}	2	▼4	14.3	1	3	10.3	2,138	9.3	+2.6
Green	{{{candidates}}}	1	Steady	7.1	1	2	6.9	4,213	18.4	+5.5
Conservative	{{{candidates}}}	0	▼2	0.0	1	1	3.4	2,601	11.4	–17.0
Liberal Democrats	{{{candidates}}}	0	Steady	0.0	0	0	0.0	1,353	5.9	+3.1

== Incumbents ==
Ward	Incumbent councillor	Party	Re-standing
Buckingham	Emma Evans	Conservative	No
Churchill	Steve Neocleous	Independent	Yes
Cokeham	Tony Bellasis	Conservative	Yes
Eastbrook	Carol O'Neal	Labour	No
Hillside	Neil Parkin (Note: Originally elected as a Conservative, but left the party to sit as an independent.)	Independent	No
Manor	Carol Albury	Independent	Yes
Marine	Julia Watts	Independent	Yes
Mash Barn	Lee Cowen	Labour	Yes
Peverel	Paul Mansfield	Independent	Yes
Southlands	Dan Flower	Labour	Yes
Southwick Green	Jude Harvey	Labour	No
St Mary's	Jeremy Gardner	Labour	Yes
St Nicolas	Julian Shinn	Green	No
Widewater	Andy McGregor	Independent	No

== Candidates ==
=== Buckingham ===
Buckingham
Party	Candidate	Votes	%	±%
Labour	David Devoy	632	38.5	–12.4
Reform	David Cotton	393	23.9	N/A
Conservative	Kevin Boram	364	22.2	–9.5
Green	Gabe Crisp	159	9.7	+4.5
Liberal Democrats	William Harpley	95	5.8	–6.5
Majority		239	14.6	–4.6
Turnout		1,643	53.7	+9.7
Labour gain from Conservative				

=== Churchill ===
Churchill
Party	Candidate	Votes	%	±%
Reform	Mike Mendoza	459	29.7	N/A
Independent	Steve Neocleous*	388	25.1	N/A
Labour	Vikki Fryer	225	14.6	–30.5
Green	Stuart Richardson	194	12.6	+0.9
Conservative	Tony Nicklen	157	10.2	–33.0
Liberal Democrats	Ashley Ridley	122	7.9	N/A
Majority		71	4.6	N/A
Turnout		1,545	45.1	+17.9
Reform gain from Independent				

=== Cokeham ===
Cokeham
Party	Candidate	Votes	%	±%
Reform	Jim Doubtfire	650	42.7	N/A
Conservative	Tony Ballasis*	303	19.9	–14.4
Labour	Alun Jones	270	17.8	–21.1
Green	Adam Baxter	201	13.2	+5.6
Liberal Democrats	David Thompson	97	6.4	–0.3
Majority		347	22.8	N/A
Turnout		1,521	44.5	+14.0
Reform gain from Conservative				

=== Eastbrook ===
Eastbrook
Party	Candidate	Votes	%	±%
Labour	David Lovelidge	501	36.1	–22.5
Reform	Joby Pannell	379	27.3	N/A
Conservative	Kelvin Fry	219	15.8	–17.4
Green	Patrick Ginnelly	219	15.8	+7.5
Liberal Democrats	Jacqueline Bartram	70	5.0	N/A
Majority		122	8.8	–16.6
Turnout		1,388	42.4	+11.2
Labour hold				

=== Hillside ===
Hillside
Party	Candidate	Votes	%	±%
Reform	Rhys Grinstead	463	34.1	N/A
Labour	Pat McGrath	345	25.4	–28.9
Conservative	Leila Williams	343	25.2	–14.1
Green	Declan Decke	208	15.3	+8.9
Majority		118	8.7	N/A
Turnout		1,359	40.6	+7.4
Reform gain from Independent				

=== Manor ===
Manor
Party	Candidate	Votes	%	±%
Independent	Carol Albury*	599	38.3	N/A
Reform	Mark Burton	473	30.2	N/A
Labour	Jude Harvey	221	14.1	–19.7
Green	Effy Walsh	221	14.1	+5.1
Liberal Democrats	Cheikh Gueye	51	3.3	–1.6
Majority		126	8.1	N/A
Turnout		1,565	49.0	+14.6
Independent hold				

=== Marine ===
Marine
Party	Candidate	Votes	%	±%
Independent	Julia Watts*	997	48.7	–19.0
Green	Troy Wade	531	25.9	+17.2
Reform	Paul Garrett	289	14.1	N/A
Labour	Pat Alden	178	8.7	–11.8
Liberal Democrats	Neville Pressley	52	2.5	–0.5
Majority		466	22.8	–24.4
Turnout		2,047	57.8	+18.6
Independent hold				

=== Mash Barn ===
Mash Barn
Party	Candidate	Votes	%	±%
Labour	Lee Cowen*	631	38.5	–24.8
Reform	Victoria Fairman	598	36.5	N/A
Conservative	Susan Fry	183	11.2	–17.4
Green	Katie Piatt	165	10.1	+2.0
Liberal Democrats	Carolyn White	62	3.8	N/A
Majority		33	2.0	–32.7
Turnout		1,639	43.8	+14.3
Labour hold				

=== Peverel ===
Peverel
Party	Candidate	Votes	%	±%
Reform	Stuart Parsons	548	38.5	N/A
Conservative	Matt Fry	267	18.8	–25.4
Labour	Henry Allinson	261	18.3	–30.8
Green	Saffi Price	194	13.6	+6.8
Independent	Paul Mansfield*	154	10.8	N/A
Majority		281	19.7	N/A
Turnout		1,424	42.2	+10.4
Reform gain from Independent				

=== Southlands ===
Southlands
Party	Candidate	Votes	%	±%
Reform	Nigel Hepworth	456	35.9	N/A
Labour	Peter Ashley	376	29.6	–27.1
Green	Maggie Rumble	251	19.7	+14.0
Liberal Democrats	Keith Humphrey	188	14.8	+7.3
Majority		80	6.3	N/A
Turnout		1,271	41.1	+9.9
Reform gain from Labour				

=== Southwick Green ===
Southwick Green
Party	Candidate	Votes	%	±%
Labour	Dan Flower*	674	42.8	–21.3
Reform	Stuart Bower	326	20.7	N/A
Conservative	Julie Searle	265	16.8	–6.1
Green	Helen Mears	231	14.7	+8.8
Liberal Democrats	Anthony Stuart	79	5.0	–2.1
Majority		348	22.1	–19.1
Turnout		1,575	46.4	+10.6
Labour hold				

=== St Mary's ===
St Mary's
Party	Candidate	Votes	%	±%
Labour Co-op	Jeremy Gardner*	839	43.6	–18.8
Green	Angie Buhl-Nielsen	431	22.4	+5.6
Reform	Kate Michaela	367	19.1	N/A
Conservative	Maryam Shapouri	194	10.1	–10.6
Liberal Democrats	Dawn Rowatt	95	4.9	N/A
Majority		408	21.2	N/A
Turnout		1,926	48.1	+12.1
Labour Co-op hold		Swing	▼12.2	

=== St Nicolas ===
St Nicolas
Party	Candidate	Votes	%	±%
Green	Liam Tidy	770	40.8	+0.7
Reform	Jennifer Mendoza	354	18.8	N/A
Conservative	Bob Towner	306	16.2	–11.3
Labour	Kathryn Upton	295	15.6	–9.1
Liberal Democrats	Ian Jones	162	8.6	+5.7
Majority		416	22.0	+9.4
Turnout		1,887	58.7	+7.9
Green hold				

=== Widewater ===
Widewater
Party	Candidate	Votes	%	±%
Reform	Joe Pannell	945	45.3	N/A
Green	Connor Ranahan	438	21.0	–1.2
Labour	Joseph O'Halloran	423	20.3	–17.8
Liberal Democrats	Samantha Eaton	280	13.4	N/A
Majority		507	24.3	N/A
Turnout		2,086	45.3	+9.3
Reform gain from Independent				
