= 2024 Worthing Borough Council election =

Local election in Worthing Borough, England

- 2 May 2024

13 of 37 Seats to Worthing Borough Council 19 seats needed for a majority
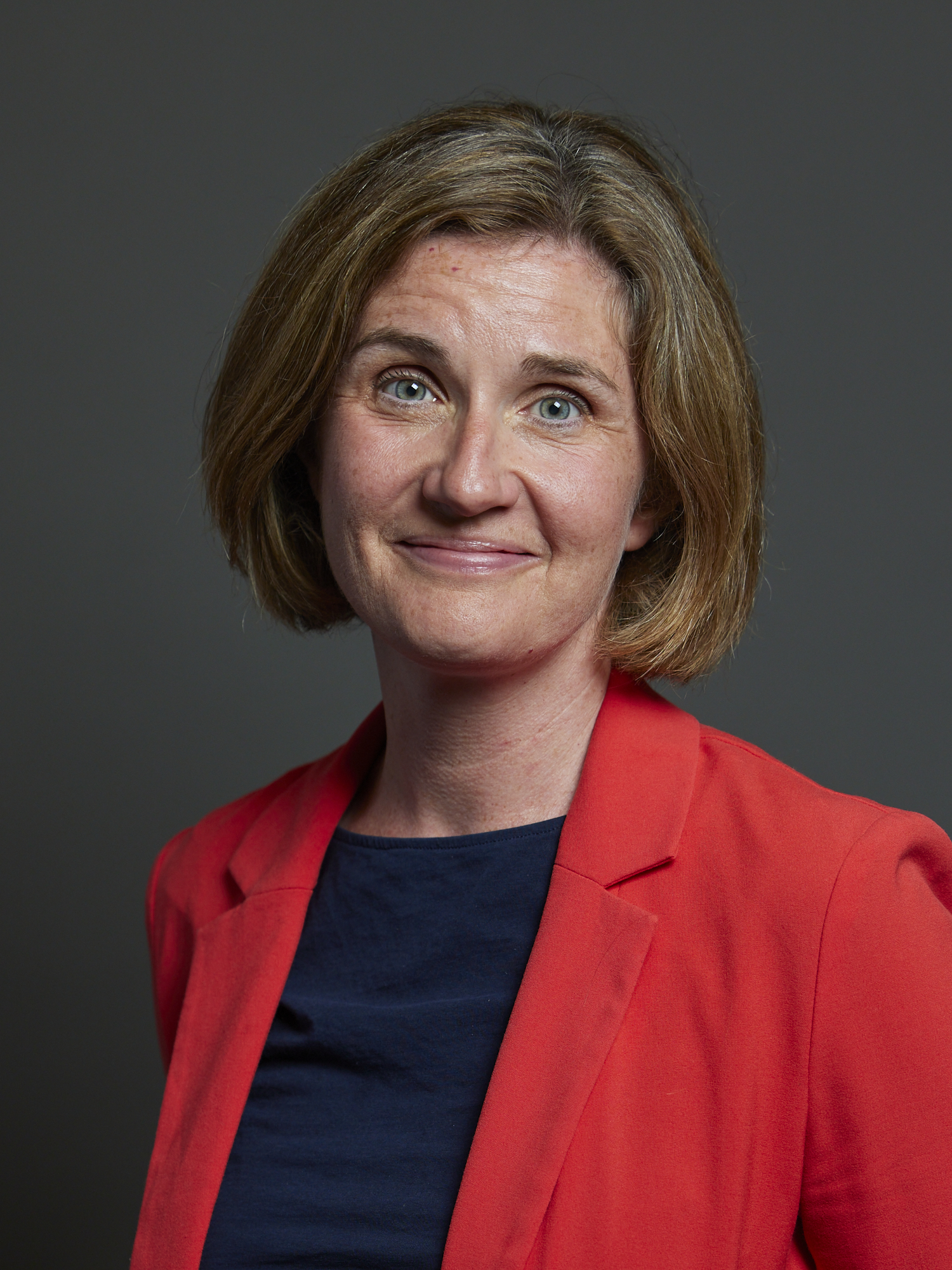

	First party	Second party
Leader	Beccy Cooper	Kevin Jenkins
Party	Labour	Conservative
Leader's seat	Marine	Goring
Last election	24 seats, 45.7%	11 seats, 31.5%
Seats before	24	11
Seats won	9	3
Seats after	26	9
Seat change	▲2	▼2
Popular vote	12,857	9,065
Percentage	45.1%	31.8%
Swing	▼0.6%	▲0.3%
	Third party	Fourth party
Leader	Clare Hunt	Hazel Thorpe
Party	Green	Liberal Democrats
Leader's seat	Goring	Tarring (Defeated)
Last election	1 seat, 13.3%	1 seat, 6.8%
Seats before	1	1
Seats won	1	0
Seats after	2	0
Seat change	▲1	▼1
Popular vote	3,865	2,703
Percentage	13.6%	9.5%
Swing	▲0.3%	▲0.6%
- Winner of each seat at the 2024 Worthing Borough Council election
Leader before election
Beccy Cooper
Labour
Leader after election
Beccy Cooper
Labour

The 2024 Worthing Borough Council election was held on Thursday 2 May 2024, alongside the other local elections being held in the United Kingdom on the same day.

Labour retained their majority on the council. Three days after the election, three Labour councillors resigned from the party, although the party retained its majority.

== By-elections ==
At the 2024 United Kingdom General Election, Council leader Dr Beccy Cooper was elected as the MP for Worthing West. As a result, she resigned as Leader and as a Councillor on Wednesday July 10, neccecitating a by-election in Marine Ward. Cllr Sophie Cox replaced Cooper as Leader on Tuesday 23 July 2024.

== Background ==
Worthing Borough Council elects a third of its councillors 3 out of every 4 years, with elections to West Sussex County Council in the 4th year. 13 seats out of 37 were up for election in 2024.

At the previous election, held in 2023, the Labour Party increased the number of seats they had on the council by 1 to have 24 seats. The Conservative Party lost 2 seats and the Greens gained 1. As a result, the council remained under Labour control.

The Liberal Democrats went into the election defending their last seat on the council, in Tarring ward, having been in overall control of the council as recently as 2003.

Pre-Election Composition
Party	Seats
Labour	24
Conservative	11
Green	1
Lib Dem	1

== Ward results ==
All 13 wards have a full slate of candidates from Labour, the Conservatives, the Greens and the Lib Dems.

The Candidates nominated for each ward are as follows (* indicates incumbent):

=== Broadwater ===
Broadwater
Party	Candidate	Votes	%	±%
Labour	Catherine Glynn-Davies*	1,218	58.8	+1.7
Conservative	John Robert Salisbury	515	24.8	−2.7
Green	Valerie Eileen Daphne Knight	190	9.1	+1.2
Liberal Democrats	John Christopher Apsey	149	7.2	−0.2
Majority		703	34.01	
Turnout		2,096	30.61	−3.00
Registered electors		6,847		
Labour hold		Swing		

=== Castle ===
Castle
Party	Candidate	Votes	%	±%
Labour Co-op	Sam Theodoridi(*)	895	47.0	−3.3
Conservative	Tom Taylor	591	31.0	−0.9
Liberal Democrats	Nick Wiltshire	253	13.3	+2.8
Green	Nellie De Goguel	166	8.7	+1.4
Majority		304	16.0	
Turnout		1,921	27.69	−3.16
Registered electors		6,937		
Labour Co-op gain from Conservative		Swing		

=== Central ===
Central
Party	Candidate	Votes	%	±%
Labour	Rosey Whorlow*	1,372	59.2	−0.6
Conservative	Diane Guest	519	22.4	−1.4
Green	Jo Paul	272	11.7	+0.9
Liberal Democrats	David Kingston	156	6.7	−2.9
Majority		860	36.8	
Turnout		2,346	30.55	−1.08
Registered electors		7,679		
Labour hold		Swing		

=== Durrington ===
Durrington
Party	Candidate	Votes	%	±%
Conservative	Josh Harris	583	42.7	−5.1
Labour	Mary Bridget Mernagh	538	39.4	+3.0
Liberal Democrats	Michael Donin	168	12.3	−3.5
Green	Jimi Taylor	77	5.6	N/A
Majority		45	3.3	
Turnout		1,383	30.76	
Registered electors		4,496		
Conservative hold		Swing		

=== Gaisford ===
Gaisford
Party	Candidate	Votes	%	±%
Labour	John Turley*	1,364	55.9	−0.5
Conservative	Bryan Turner	669	27.4	+0.5
Green	Stephen Wardle Carlysmith	249	10.2	+2.7
Liberal Democrats	Mark Etchells	158	6.5	+0.7
Majority		695	28.5	
Turnout		2,455	35.15	−3.37
Registered electors		6,984		
Labour hold		Swing		

=== Goring ===
Goring
Party	Candidate	Votes	%	±%
Green	Ian Arthur Davey	1,696	55.8	+5.3
Conservative	Paisley Thompson	982	32.3	−2.6
Labour	Tshepo Ronald Skwambane	271	8.2	−3.5
Liberal Democrats	Merlin Jones	89	2.9	−0.1
Majority		714	23.5	
Turnout		3,066	44.51	−1.76
Registered electors		6,888		
Green gain from Conservative		Swing		

=== Heene ===
Heene
Party	Candidate	Votes	%	±%
Labour	Tom Ellum	1,245	56.3	−0.2
Conservative	Roy Barraclough	580	26.2	−1.3
Green	Constantine De Goguel	232	10.5	+2.1
Liberal Democrats	Matt Hoyland	153	6.9	−0.7
Majority		665	30.1	
Turnout		2,228	33.81	−0.68
Registered electors		6,589		
Labour hold		Swing		

=== Marine ===
Marine
Party	Candidate	Votes	%	±%
Labour	Rebecca Cooper*	1,501	56.0	+3.2
Conservative	Oliver Jones	833	31.1	−1.7
Green	Julie Dawe	198	7.4	−1.8
Liberal Democrats	Trudi Ann Starling	149	5.6	+0.4
Majority		668	24.9	
Turnout		2,699	40.40	−1.26
Registered electors		6,680		
Labour hold		Swing		

=== Northbrook ===
Northbrook
Party	Candidate	Votes	%	±%
Labour	Dom Ford	647	47.9	+3.3
Conservative	Russ Cochran*	517	38.2	−5.3
Liberal Democrats	Robin Thurston Rodgers	103	7.6	−4.3
Green	James Edmund Raymond Darrall	85	6.3	N/A
Majority		130	9.7	
Turnout		1,358	24.98	
Registered electors		5,436		
Labour gain from Conservative		Swing		

=== Offington ===
Offington
Party	Candidate	Votes	%	±%
Conservative	Elizabeth Sparkes*	1,256	52.7	−1.2
Labour	Liz Nicholson	782	32.8	+4.5
Green	Steve Rhodes	186	7.8	−1.9
Liberal Democrats	Iona Harte	161	6.8	−1.4
Majority		474	19.9	
Turnout		2,402	36.81	−0.47
Registered electors		6,525		
Conservative hold		Swing		

=== Salvington ===
Salvington
Party	Candidate	Votes	%	±%
Conservative	Richard Nowak*	1,154	47.8	+0.9
Labour	Anthony Paul Squires	847	35.1	±0.0
Liberal Democrats	Emma Kate Norton	242	10.0	−0.6
Green	Sonya Lynne Mallin	170	7.1	−0.2
Majority		307	12.7	
Turnout		2,435	34.12	−0.61
Registered electors		7,136		
Conservative hold		Swing		

=== Selden ===
Selden
Party	Candidate	Votes	%	±%
Labour	Jon Roser*	1,168	57.1	−5.4
Conservative	Sarah Louise Blake	529	25.8	+2.8
Green	Clare Ann Marshall	193	9.4	+1.6
Liberal Democrats	Christine Beryl Brown	157	7.7	+1.0
Majority		639	31.3	
Turnout		2,061	33.50	−2.45
Registered electors		6,152		
Labour hold		Swing		

=== Tarring ===
Tarring
Party	Candidate	Votes	%	±%
Labour	Lysanne Charlotte Skinner	1,009	44.6	−3.6
Liberal Democrats	Hazel Thorpe*	765	33.8	+7.5
Conservative	Christina Shane-Chan	337	14.9	−1.0
Green	Karen Elizabeth Brooks	151	6.7	+0.7
Majority		234	10.8	
Turnout		2,292	35.96	−2.13
Registered electors		6,373		
Labour gain from Liberal Democrats		Swing		

== By-elections ==
=== Marine ===
Marine by-election: 20 September 2024
Party	Candidate	Votes	%	±%
Conservative	Thomas Taylor	885	41.3	+10.2
Labour	Mary Mernagh	781	36.4	–19.6
Reform UK	Lionel Harman	228	10.6	N/A
Green	Jimi Taylor	138	6.4	–1.0
Liberal Democrats	Nicholas Wiltshire	113	5.3	–0.3
Majority		104	4.9	N/A
Turnout		2,146	32.0	–8.4
Conservative gain from Labour		Swing	▲14.9	

=== Heene ===
Heene by-election: 10 October 2024
Party	Candidate	Votes	%	±%
Conservative	Luke Houghton	742	42.0	+15.8
Labour	Anthony Squires	704	39.9	–16.4
Green	Kate Thornton	186	10.5	±0.0
Liberal Democrats	Trudi Starling	133	7.5	+0.6
Majority		38	2.1	N/A
Turnout		1,776	27.0	–6.8
Conservative gain from Labour		Swing	▲16.1	
