= 1979 Adur District Council election =

1979 UK local government election

← 1976	3 May 1979	1980 →

All 39 seats to Adur District Council 20 seats needed for a majority
	First party	Second party	Third party
Party	Conservative	Liberal	Residents
Seats won	20	17	2
Seat change	▲4	Steady	Steady
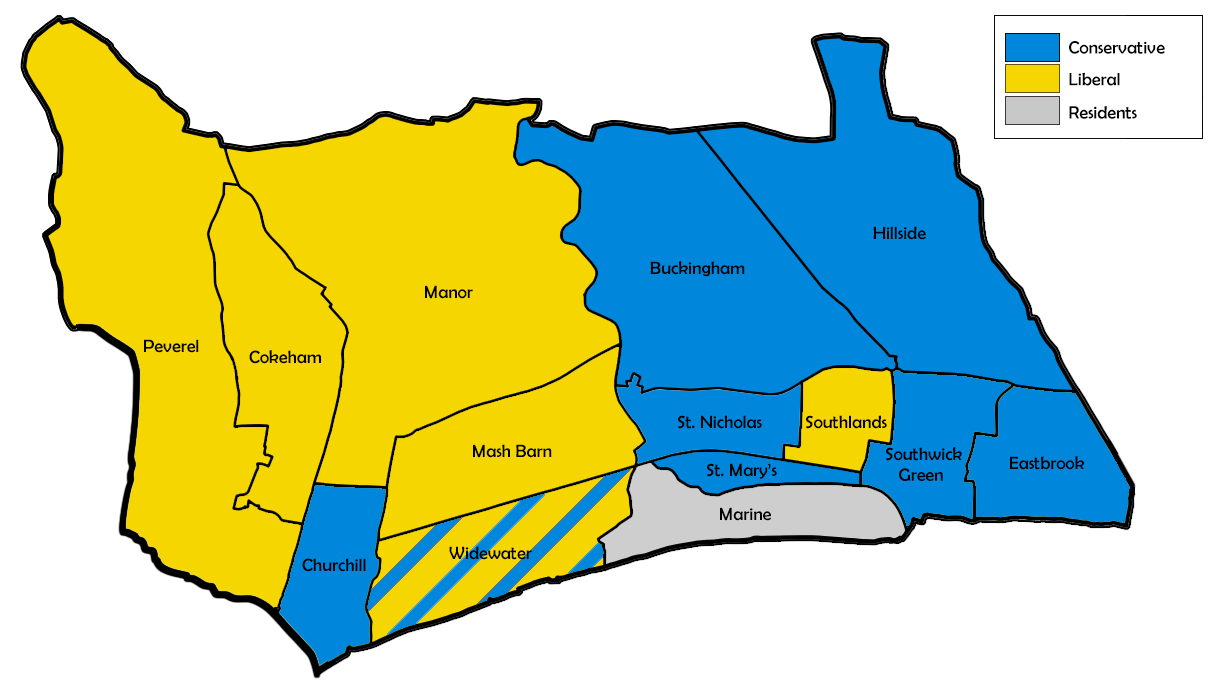
- Map showing the results of the 1979 Adur council elections
Majority party before election
No overall control
Majority party after election
Conservative

Elections to the Adur District Council were held on 3 May 1979, alongside the general election. The entire council was up for election, following boundary changes that reduced the number of wards by one, but all together had added two seats. Overall turnout was recorded at 74.4%.

The election resulted in the Conservatives gaining control of the council.

== Election result ==
Adur District Council Election Result 1979
Party	Seats	Gains	Losses	Net gain/loss	Seats %	Votes %	Votes	+/−
Conservative	20	0	0	+4	51.3	45.1	15,819	+0.3
Liberal	17	0	0	0	43.6	35.3	12,364	-0.9
Residents	2	0	0	0	5.1	4.0	1,408	+0.5
Labour	0	0	0	-2	0.0	15.6	5,452	+0.1

This resulted in the following composition of the council:

Party	Previous council	New council
Conservative	16	20
Liberal	17	17
Labour	2	0
Independent Residents	2	2
Total	37	39
Working majority	-5	1

== Ward results ==
Buckingham (4025)
Party	Candidate	Votes	%	±%
Conservative	Merrick A.	1,960	60.8	N/A
Conservative	Morris H. Ms.	1,890		
Conservative	Smith M.	1,850		
Liberal	Symonds A.	891	27.6	N/A
Liberal	Wright G. Ms.	861		
Liberal	Jewiss A.	795		
Labour	Bovingdon K.	372	11.5	N/A
Majority		1,069	33.2	N/A
Turnout		3,223	80.1	N/A
Conservative win (new seat)				
Conservative win (new seat)				
Conservative win (new seat)				

Churchill (3781)
Party	Candidate	Votes	%	±%
Conservative	Burley Y. Ms.	1,322	46.5	N/A
Conservative	Kemp C.	1,283		
Conservative	Stepney L. Ms.	1,226		
Liberal	Denyer P.	1,132	39.8	N/A
Liberal	Dolding R.	1,093		
Liberal	Martin E. Ms.	1,046		
Labour	Woods J. Ms.	389	13.7	N/A
Majority		190	6.7	N/A
Turnout		2,843	75.2	N/A
Conservative win (new seat)				
Conservative win (new seat)				
Conservative win (new seat)				

Cokeham (3596)
Party	Candidate	Votes	%	±%
Liberal	Cheal J.	1,413	49.6	N/A
Liberal	Martin D.	1,340		
Liberal	Spalding M.	1,277		
Conservative	Lodge R.	1,061	37.2	N/A
Conservative	Newman H.	852		
Labour	Atkins B.	377	13.2	N/A
Majority		352	12.3	N/A
Turnout		2,851	79.3	N/A
Liberal win (new seat)				
Liberal win (new seat)				
Liberal win (new seat)				

Eastbrook (3692)
Party	Candidate	Votes	%	±%
Conservative	Coghlan J.	1,338	55.2	N/A
Conservative	Dunn R.	1,318		
Conservative	Parish D. Ms.	1,238		
Labour	Hobbis J.	1,087	44.8	N/A
Labour	Barnard I.	1,059		
Labour	Boreham J.	666		
Majority		251	10.4	N/A
Turnout		2,425	65.7	N/A
Conservative win (new seat)				
Conservative win (new seat)				
Conservative win (new seat)				

Hillside (3891)
Party	Candidate	Votes	%	±%
Conservative	Barber B.	1,613	50.3	N/A
Conservative	Wey G.	1,495		
Conservative	Moore M.	1,436		
Labour	Colville P.	840	26.2	N/A
Liberal	Hammond D.	754	23.5	N/A
Liberal	Kimmings R.	684		
Liberal	Ongley C.	569		
Majority		773	24.1	N/A
Turnout		3,207	82.4	N/A
Conservative win (new seat)				
Conservative win (new seat)				
Conservative win (new seat)				

Manor (3336)
Party	Candidate	Votes	%	±%
Liberal	Robinson C.	1,444	56.7	N/A
Liberal	Barton J.	1,313		
Liberal	Cooper M.	1,195		
Conservative	Lewis J.	1,101	43.3	N/A
Conservative	Hockett L.	1,058		
Conservative	Shackleton P. Ms.	1,039		
Majority		343	13.5	N/A
Turnout		2,545	76.3	N/A
Liberal win (new seat)				
Liberal win (new seat)				
Liberal win (new seat)				

Marine (2577)2
Party	Candidate	Votes	%	±%
Residents	Warner B. Ms.	1,408	65.2	N/A
Residents	James P. Ms.	1,369		
Conservative	Harding I. Ms.	618	28.6	N/A
Labour	Kell D.	134	6.2	N/A
Majority		790	36.6	N/A
Turnout		2,160	83.8	N/A
Residents win (new seat)				
Residents win (new seat)				

Mash Barn (2809)
Party	Candidate	Votes	%	±%
Liberal	Allen C. Ms.	1,046	51.2	N/A
Liberal	Hartley J. Ms.	1,017		
Liberal	Deedman D.	1,001		
Conservative	Floyd J.	755	36.9	N/A
Conservative	Clothier W.	724		
Conservative	Grover M.	709		
Labour	Harwood R.	243	11.9	N/A
Labour	Grafton R.	237		
Labour	Jacques W.	233		
Majority		291	14.2	N/A
Turnout		2,044	72.8	N/A
Liberal win (new seat)				
Liberal win (new seat)				
Liberal win (new seat)				

Peverel (3178)
Party	Candidate	Votes	%	±%
Liberal	Davis G.	1,213	50.9	N/A
Liberal	Green W.	1,203		
Liberal	Hall M. Ms.	1,107		
Conservative	Glynn E.	829	34.8	N/A
Conservative	Donegan I. Ms.	818		
Conservative	Martin P. Ms.	773		
Labour	Atkins H. Ms.	343	14.4	N/A
Majority		384	16.1	N/A
Turnout		2,385	75.0	N/A
Liberal win (new seat)				
Liberal win (new seat)				
Liberal win (new seat)				

Southlands (3282)
Party	Candidate	Votes	%	±%
Liberal	Little S.	1,147	48.7	N/A
Liberal	Edwards A.	1,095		
Liberal	Robinson J.	1,055		
Conservative	Osmond P.	866	36.7	N/A
Conservative	Cakebread J.	776		
Conservative	Thomson W.	696		
Labour	Whipp B.	344	14.6	N/A
Labour	Paling A.	327		
Labour	Paling M. Ms.	292		
Majority		281	11.9	N/A
Turnout		2,357	71.8	N/A
Liberal win (new seat)				
Liberal win (new seat)				
Liberal win (new seat)				

Southwick Green (3479)
Party	Candidate	Votes	%	±%
Conservative	Davies B. Ms.	1,298	52.0	N/A
Conservative	Divers N.	1,286		
Conservative	Sweet I. Ms.	1,245		
Liberal	Hutchinson J. Ms.	686	27.5	N/A
Liberal	Biggs A.	642		
Liberal	Isherwood P.	557		
Labour	Munnery D.	511	20.5	N/A
Majority		612	24.5	N/A
Turnout		2,495	71.7	N/A
Conservative win (new seat)				
Conservative win (new seat)				
Conservative win (new seat)				

St. Marys (1069)
Party	Candidate	Votes	%	±%
Conservative	Richards R.	345	47.8	N/A
Liberal	Bienati C. Ms.	279	38.6	N/A
Labour	Whipp L. Ms.	98	13.6	N/A
Majority		66	9.1	N/A
Turnout		722	67.5	N/A
Conservative win (new seat)				

St. Nicolas (3687)3
Party	Candidate	Votes	%	±%
Conservative	Carr G.	1,404	50.3	N/A
Conservative	Huber J.	1,372		
Conservative	Potter E.	1,332		
Liberal	Atrill D. Ms.	1,017	36.4	N/A
Liberal	Lock M.	902		
Liberal	Stanley A.	867		
Labour	Phillips J.	373	13.4	N/A
Labour	Pirie M. Ms.	310		
Majority		387	13.9	N/A
Turnout		2,794	75.8	N/A
Conservative win (new seat)				
Conservative win (new seat)				
Conservative win (new seat)				

Widewater (3968)
Party	Candidate	Votes	%	±%
Liberal	Gasson J.	1,342	44.9	N/A
Conservative	Melvey T.	1,309	43.8	N/A
Liberal	Sherlock M. Ms.	1,299		
Conservative	Mitchell M. Ms.	1,276		
Liberal	Isherwood D. Ms.	1,268		
Conservative	Charlton S.	1,232		
Labour	Harwood J. Ms.	341	11.4	N/A
Majority		33	1.1	N/A
Turnout		2,992	75.4	N/A
Liberal win (new seat)				
Conservative win (new seat)				
Liberal win (new seat)				
