= Ellen Chapman =

British suffragist and politician

- Occupation: Politician
- Known for: First woman councillor for Worthing

Ellen Chapman was an English suffragist and local politician, and the first woman councillor for Worthing.

== Career ==
Ellen Chapman was the first woman to run for election to Worthing Borough Council, and in 1910 became the first woman councillor, and one of the first woman councillors in England. In 1920, Chapman became Worthing's first female mayor, and the first female mayor anywhere in Sussex. She was a great benefactor of the poor in Worthing and lived in Ardsheal Road, Broadwater.

Chapman had been selected to be mayor in 1914 but the choice was vetoed at the last minute because – to quote a member of the all-male mayoral selection committee – “it would be inadvisable to have a woman mayor while the country is in a state of war”.

Chapman had also been a poor law guardian at the East Preston Union. She was also a member of the National Union of Women's Suffrage Societies and founder and president of the Worthing Women's Franchise Society, a branch of the NUWSS, in 1913. She was also a member of the Conservative and Unionist Women's Franchise Association and the Catholic Women's Suffrage Society. Ellen Chapman was largely responsible for the Worthing Women's Franchise Society taking a leading role in the Sussex-wide campaign for ‘Votes for Women’. Chapman also led several deputations to meet Government ministers and met members of the local establishment including the Women's Social and Political Union and the fledgling local Labour Party to lobby and persuade people of the merits of women's suffrage and non-violence.

Chapman was elected to West Sussex County Council in 1919 and was the first woman to do so, with Evelyn Gladys Cecil from Bognor Regis. Chapman was elected unopposed to the Broadwater ward.

== Bibliography ==
- Crawford, Elizabeth (2013). The Women's Suffrage Movement in Britain and Ireland: A Regional Survey. Routledge. ISBN 9781136010620.
- Hare, Chris (1991). Historic Worthing: The Untold Story. Cassell Reference. ISBN 9780900075919.
