= Adur & Worthing Councils =

Local government bodies in England

- Formation: 1 April 2008
- Type: Joint local government
- Location: West Sussex, England
- Region served: Adur District; Worthing
- Parent organization: Adur District Council; Worthing Borough Council
- Website: www.adur-worthing.gov.uk

Adur & Worthing Councils refers to two local government bodies, Adur District Council and Worthing Borough Council, in West Sussex, England, who have operated under a joint management structure, with a single Chief Executive, since 1 April 2008.
