= Worthing Borough Council =

Local authority for Worthing, West Sussex, England

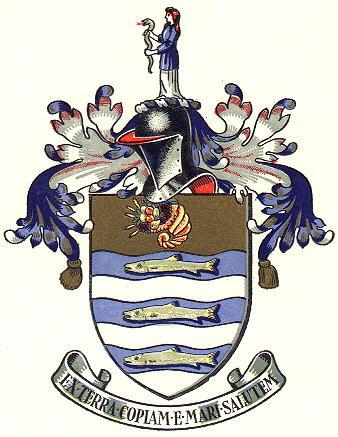

Type
- Type: Non-metropolitan district

Leadership
- Mayor: Lysanne Skinner, Labour since 19 May 2026
- Leader: Caroline Baxter, Labour since 19 May 2026
- Chief Executive: Paul Brewer since July 2025

Structure
- Seats: 37 councillors
- Political groups: Administration (15) Labour (15) Other parties (22) Green (8) Conservative (6) Reform (5) Independent (2) Liberal Democrats (1)
- Joint committees: Various joint committees of Adur and Worthing Councils; Greater Brighton City Board

Elections
- Voting system: First past the post
- Last election: May 2026

Motto
- "Ex terra copiam e mari salutem" (Latin for "From the land plenty and from the sea health")

Meeting place
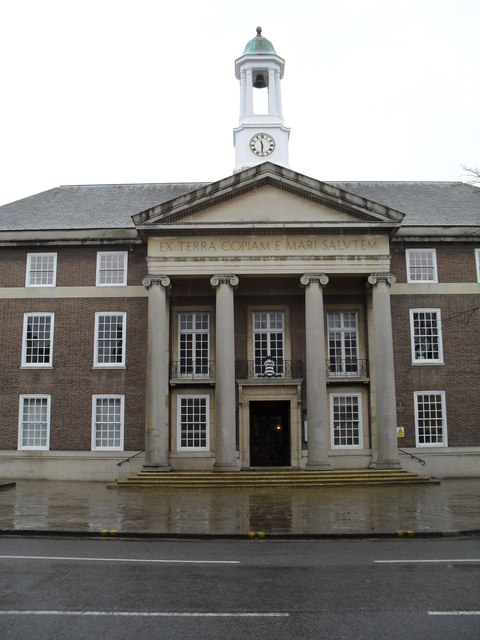
- Town Hall, Chapel Road, Worthing, BN11 1HA

Website
- www.adur-worthing.gov.uk

Worthing Borough Council is the local authority for Worthing in West Sussex, England. Worthing is a non-metropolitan district with borough status. It forms the lower tier of local government in Worthing, responsible for local services such as housing, planning, leisure and tourism. The council is currently under no overall control, with the Labour Party running a minority administration. It is based at Worthing Town Hall.

== History ==
=== Commissioners (1803–1852) ===
Worthing was historically a hamlet in the ancient parish of Broadwater. Until 1803 it was administered by the Broadwater parish vestry, in the same way as most rural areas.

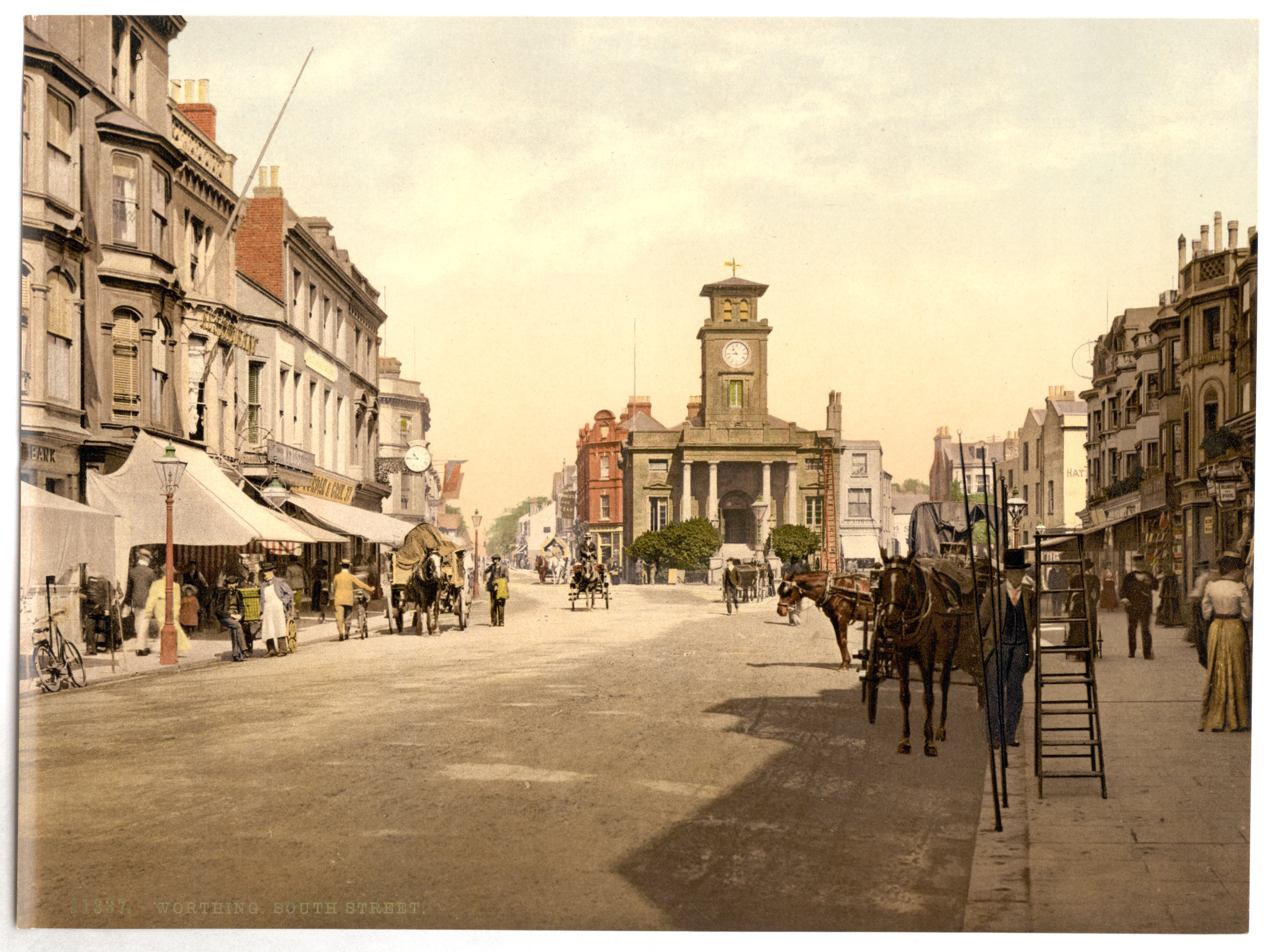
Old Town Hall, South Street: Completed 1835, demolished 1966

Worthing's first form of urban local government was a body of improvement commissioners, established in 1803 with responsibility for street paving and lighting, sewerage and policing. The first chairman of the commissioners was Timothy Shelley. The commissioners' responsibilities were gradually expanded by subsequent Acts of Parliament. The commissioners initially met at hotels in the town until 1835 when they built Worthing's first town hall at the northern end of South Street.

=== Local board (1852–1890) ===
The commissioners were replaced in 1852 when Worthing was made a local board district. A separate body of improvement commissioners was established in 1865 covering West Worthing, which was being developed as a new town in the neighbouring parish of Heene.

=== Municipal borough (1890–1974) ===
In 1890 Worthing and West Worthing were merged and incorporated as a municipal borough called Worthing. The borough was governed by a body formally called the "mayor, aldermen and burgesses of the borough of Worthing", generally known as the corporation, town council or borough council. The first mayor was Alfred Cortis. The borough initially covered the whole of the parish of Heene and the part of the parish of Broadwater which had been the old local board district. The part of Broadwater within the borough became a separate parish called Worthing in 1894, which was enlarged to cover the whole borough in 1902. The borough was enlarged on several occasions, notably in 1902 when West Tarring and the residual parish of Broadwater were abolished, and in 1929 when the borough absorbed Goring-by-Sea and Durrington.

In 1910 Ellen Chapman became Worthing's first woman councillor and one of the first women councillors in the UK. She subsequently became the first female mayor of Worthing in 1920.

The Labour Party first put up candidates in Worthing in 1919, and its first councillor, Charles Barber, was elected in 1922. Worthing was the first town in the UK to establish a branch of the Middle Class Union, which in Worthing was largely made up of retired army personnel. An MCU candidate, Colonel Connolly, was elected in 1921. The elections of Connolly and Barber brought about an end to the tradition in Worthing of non-party participation in elections.

In 1933, Charles Bentinck Budd, who had been elected as an independent councillor to both Worthing Borough Council and West Sussex County Council in 1930, joined the British Union of Fascists. He was subsequently re-elected to the borough council in the 1933 elections, and the national press reported that Worthing was the first town in the country to elect a fascist councillor. Over the next few months tensions rose, culminating on 9 October 1934 when anti-fascist protesters met outside a blackshirt rally at the Pavilion Theatre, in what became known as the Battle of South Street.

Between 1933 and 1939 the Worthing Corporation purchased 1,000 acres (405 ha) of downland to the north of Worthing, which forms the Worthing Downland Estate. In 1939 the Worthing Corporation purchased 72 acres (29 ha) acres of land at High Salvington. This land adjoined another 59 acres (24 ha) acres that were purchased around the same time.

=== Modern borough (1974 onwards) ===
Worthing was reformed to become a non-metropolitan district in 1974 under the Local Government Act 1972. It kept the same boundaries, but there were changes to its responsibilities. Worthing retained its borough status, allowing the chair of the reformed council to take the title of mayor, continuing Worthing's series of mayors dating back to 1890.

Since 2008 Worthing Borough Council has worked in partnership with Adur District Council, as Adur and Worthing Councils, sharing a joint management structure, with a single Chief Executive. In 2014 the council also became a constituent member of the Greater Brighton City Region.

On 18 July 2019, Worthing Borough Council declared a climate emergency, which aims to see the council become carbon-neutral by 2030.

== Governance ==
Worthing Borough Council provides district-level services. County-level services are provided by West Sussex County Council. There are no civil parishes in the borough, which has been an unparished area since 1974.

=== Political control ===
The council went under no overall control at the 2026 election, since when it has been run by a Labour minority administration.

Political control of the council since the 1974 reforms has been as follows:

Party in control	Years
No overall control	1974–1976
Conservative	1976–1994
Liberal Democrats	1994–1999
Conservative	1999–2002
Liberal Democrats	2002–2003
No overall control	2003–2004
Conservative	2004–2022
Labour	2022–2026
No overall control	2026–present

=== Leadership ===
The role of mayor is largely ceremonial in Worthing. Political leadership is instead provided by the leader of the council. The leaders since 2002 have been:

Councillor	Party	From	To
Keith Mercer	Conservative	Oct 2002	20 Jul 2009
Paul Yallop	Conservative	Jul 2009	26 Jan 2015
Daniel Humphreys	Conservative	26 Jan 2015	10 Nov 2021
Kevin Jenkins	Conservative	10 Nov 2021	May 2022
Beccy Cooper	Labour	20 May 2022	10 Jul 2024
Sophie Cox	Labour	23 Jul 2024	May 2026
Caroline Baxter	Labour	19 May 2026	

=== Composition ===
Following the 2026 Worthing Borough Council election the composition of the council was:

Party	Composition
Labour	15
Green	8
Conservative	6
Reform	5
Independent	2
Liberal Democrats	1
Total	37

== Elections ==
Since the last boundary changes in 2004 the council has comprised 37 councillors representing 13 wards, with each ward electing two or three councillors. Elections are held three years out of every four, with roughly a third of the council being elected each time for a four-year term of office. West Sussex County Council elections are held in the fourth year of the cycle when there are no borough council elections.

=== Wards and councillors ===
Ward	2023—27 term	2024—28 term	2026—30 term
Broadwater	Dawn Smith (Labour)	Cathy Glynn-Davies (Labour)	Jimi Taylor (Green)
Castle	Sophie Cox (Labour)	Sam Theodoridi (Labour and Co-operative)	Lionel Harman (Reform UK)
Central	Caroline Baxter (Labour)	Rosey Whorlow (Labour)	Natasha Davie (Green)
Durrington		Josh Harris (Conservative)	Charles James (Reform UK)
Gaisford	Henna Chowdhury (Labour)	John Turley (Labour)	Claire Hatfield (Green)
Goring	Claire Hunt (Green)	Ian Davey (Green)	Jasmine Watkins (Green)
Heene	Helen Abrahams (Labour)	Tom Ellum (Labour)	Debbie Woudman (Green)
Marine	Vicki Wells (Labour)	Thomas Taylor (Conservative)	Martin McCabe (Labour)
Northbrook		Dom Ford (Labour)	Rob Venn (Reform UK)
Offington	Daniel Humphreys (Conservative)	Elizabeth Sparkes (Conservative)	Jeremy Carter (Reform UK)
Salvington	Noel Atkins (Conservative)	Richard Nowak (Conservative)	Karen Harman (Reform UK)
Selden	Carl Walker (Independent)	Jon Roser (Labour)	Katie Thornton (Green)
Tarring	Hilary Schan (Independent)	Lysanne Skinner (Labour)	Hazel Thorpe (Liberal Democrats)

== Premises ==
The council is based at Worthing Town Hall on Chapel Road. The building was purpose-built for the council and opened in 1933.

== Coat of arms ==
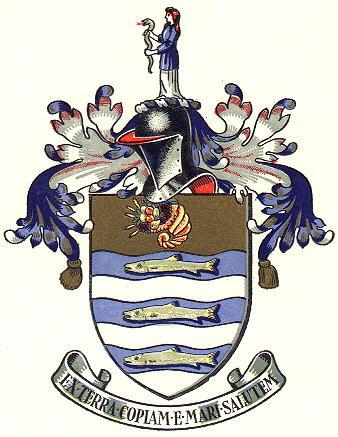
Worthing Borough Council's coat of arms was created in 1890 after the town received borough status

The borough's coat of arms includes three silver mackerel, a Horn of Plenty overflowing with corn and fruit on a cloth of gold, and the figure of a woman, considered likely to be Hygieia, the ancient Greek goddess of health, holding a snake. The images represent the health given from the seas, the fullness and riches gained from the earth and the power of healing. Worthing's motto is the Latin Ex terra copiam e mari salutem, which translates as 'From the land plenty and from the sea health'. The design was created in 1890 shortly after the town's incorporation as a borough, to serve as its official seal. The design was formally granted as a coat of arms by the College of Arms in 1919.

== See also ==
- Adur & Worthing Councils
- Worthing Borough Council elections
- History of local government in Sussex
- West Sussex County Council
- Worthing Rural District

== Bibliography ==
- Hare, Chris (1991). Historic Worthing: The Untold Story. Cassell Reference. ISBN 9780900075919.
