= 2024 Adur District Council election =

Local election in Adur District, England

- 2 May 2024

16 out of 29 seats to Adur District Council 15 seats needed for a majority

	First party	Second party
Leader	Jeremy Gardner	Neil Parkin
Party	Labour	Conservative
Last election	9 seats, 39.4%	16 seats, 38.7%
Seats before	9	15
Seats won	13	1
Seats after	17	8
Seat change	▲8	▼7
Popular vote	9,380	5,501
Percentage	48.5%	28.4%
Swing	▲9.1%	▼10.3%
	Third party	Fourth party
Leader	Gabe Crisp	n/a (Note: Of the three independent councillors, two sit together as the 'Shoreham Beach Residents Association' group, led by Joss Loader.)
Party	Green	Independent
Last election	2 seats, 14.1%	2 seats, 4.2%
Seats before	2	3
Seats won	1	1
Seats after	2	2
Seat change	Steady	▼1
Popular vote	2,502	1,291
Percentage	12.9%	6.7%
Swing	▼1.2%	▲2.5%
- Winner of each seat at the 2024 Adur District Council election
Leader before election
Neil Parkin
Conservative
Leader after election
Jeremy Gardner
Labour

The 2024 Adur District Council election was held on Thursday 2 May 2024, alongside the other local elections being held in the United Kingdom on the same day. The councillors elected will serve a 4-year term, ending in May 2028.

== Background ==
Adur District Council elects half of its councillors every 2 years, with 16 being up for election this time, being 15 ordinary elections plus a by-election in St Mary's ward.

Prior to the election, the council was under Conservative majority control, although they only had a two-seat majority and the council was identified as a target for Labour.

Pre-Election Composition
After 2022 election		Before 2024 election		After 2024 election	
Party	Seats	Party	Seats	Party	Seats
Labour	7	Labour	9	Labour	17
Conservatives	19	Conservatives	15	Conservatives	8
Greens	1	Greens	2	Greens	2
Independents	2	Independents	3	Independents	2

== Summary ==
The election saw Labour win an outright majority for the first time in the council's history. Labour group leader Jeremy Gardner was formally appointed as leader of the council at the subsequent annual council meeting on 23 May 2024.

=== Election result ===
2024 Adur District Council election
Party	This election			Full council			This election		
Party	Seats	Net	Seats %	Other	Total	Total %	Votes	Votes %	+/−
Labour	13	▲8	81.3	4	17	58.6	9,380	48.5	+9.1
Conservative	1	▼7	6.3	7	8	27.6	5,501	28.4	–10.3
Green	1	Steady	6.3	1	2	6.9	2,502	12.9	–1.2
Independent	1	▼1	6.3	1	2	6.9	1,291	6.7	+2.5
Liberal Democrats	0	Steady	0.0	0	0	0.0	534	2.8	–0.8
Britain First	0	Steady	0.0	0	0	0.0	131	0.7	N/A

== Ward results ==
=== Buckingham ===
Buckingham (1 seat)
Party	Candidate	Votes	%	±%
Labour	Nigel Jenner	681	50.9	+15.5
Conservative	Kevin Boram	424	31.7	−9.9
Liberal Democrats	Ian Jones	164	12.3	−10.7
Green	Leslie Groves-Williams	70	5.2	N/A
Turnout		1,339	44.0	+1.9
Labour gain from Conservative		Swing		

=== Churchill ===
Churchill (1 seat)
Party	Candidate	Votes	%	±%
Labour Co-op	Nigel Sweet	411	45.1	+8.6
Conservative	Mandy Buxton-Andrews	394	43.2	−8.7
Green	Peter Riley	107	11.7	+0.1
Turnout		912	27.2	−6.9
Labour gain from Conservative		Swing		

=== Cokeham ===
Cokeham (1 seat)
Party	Candidate	Votes	%	±%
Labour	Carolyn Fuhrmann	407	38.9	+4.5
Conservative	Daniel Guy	359	34.3	−18.6
Britain First	David Bamber	131	12.5	N/A
Green	Helen Mears	79	7.6	−5.1
Liberal Democrats	Steve Creed	70	6.7	N/A
Turnout		1,046	30.5	−2.2
Labour gain from Conservative		Swing		

=== Eastbrook ===
Eastbrook (1 seat)
Party	Candidate	Votes	%	±%
Labour	Andrew Harvey	596	58.6	−4.3
Conservative	Jill Lennon	338	33.2	−3.9
Green	Kristy Lascelles	84	8.3	N/A
Turnout		1,018	31.2	−4.9
Labour gain from Conservative		Swing		

=== Hillside ===
Hillside (1 seat)
Party	Candidate	Votes	%	±%
Labour	Nigel Corston	623	54.3	+4.8
Conservative	Rick Matthews	451	39.3	−11.2
Green	Russell Whiting	74	6.4	N/A
Turnout		1,148	34.19	
Labour gain from Conservative		Swing		

=== Manor ===
Manor (1 seat)
Party	Candidate	Votes	%	±%
Conservative	Carson Albury	572	52.3	−1.7
Labour	Cheryl Giles	370	33.8	+1.0
Green	Maggie Rumble	98	9.0	−4.1
Liberal Democrats	David Thompson	54	4.9	N/A
Turnout		1,094	34.42	
Conservative hold		Swing		

=== Marine ===
Marine (1 seat)
Party	Candidate	Votes	%	±%
Independent	Joss Loader	933	67.7	+15.8
Labour	Kate Davis	283	20.5	−3.3
Green	Melodie Tyrer	120	8.7	−25.6
Liberal Democrats	Bill Harpley	42	3.0	N/A
Turnout		1,378	39.16	
Independent hold		Swing		

=== Mash Barn ===
Mash Barn (1 seat)
Party	Candidate	Votes	%	±%
Labour	Sharon Sluman	655	63.3	+3.7
Conservative	Mike Mendoza	296	28.6	−0.8
Green	Kevin Elliott	84	8.1	+3.4
Turnout		1,035	29.46	
Labour hold		Swing		

=== Peverel ===
Peverel (1 seat)
Party	Candidate	Votes	%	±%
Labour	Saffa Jan	514	49.1	+9.8
Conservative	Tom Smith	462	44.1	−7.6
Green	Eileen Riley	71	6.8	−2.2
Turnout		1,047	31.80	
Labour gain from Conservative		Swing		

=== Southlands ===
Southlands (1 seat)
Party	Candidate	Votes	%	±%
Labour	Deborah Stainforth	540	56.7	+11.2
Conservative	Matt Fry	288	30.2	−4.6
Liberal Democrats	Keith Humphrey	71	7.5	−5.8
Green	Troy Wade	54	5.7	−0.7
Turnout		953	31.18	
Labour hold		Swing		

=== Southwick Green ===
Southwick Green (1 seat)
Party	Candidate	Votes	%	±%
Labour	Robina Baine	780	64.1	+16.5
Conservative	Vicky Parkin	278	22.9	−14.7
Liberal Democrats	Samuel Welton	86	7.1	−2.0
Green	Jane Mott	72	5.9	+0.2
Turnout		1,216	35.81	
Labour hold		Swing		

=== St Mary's ===
St Mary's (2 seats)
Party	Candidate	Votes	%	±%
Labour	Becky Allinson	945	69.0	+10.1
Labour	Jeremy Gardner	858	62.6	+3.7
Conservative	Vanessa Evans	314	22.9	−3.8
Green	Angie Buhl-Nielsen	255	18.6	+4.2
Turnout		1,370	35.96	
Labour hold				
Labour hold				

=== St Nicolas ===
St Nicolas (1 seat)
Party	Candidate	Votes	%	±%
Green	Gerry Thompson	652	40.1	−21.3
Conservative	Bob Towner	447	27.5	−11.1
Labour	Tim Higgins	401	24.7	N/A
Independent	Stuart Bower	77	4.7	N/A
Liberal Democrats	James Burrage	47	2.9	N/A
Turnout		1,624	50.79	
Green hold		Swing		

=== Widewater ===
Widewater (2 seats)
Party	Candidate	Votes	%	±%
Labour	Adrienne Lowe	712	41.9	−1.4
Labour	Pauline Higgins	604	35.6	−7.7
Conservative	Joe Pannell	463	27.3	−19.6
Conservative	Kirstie Pannell	415	24.4	−22.5
Green	Patrick Ginnelly	346	20.4	+10.6
Green	Victoria Benson	336	19.8	+10.0
Independent	Ann Bridges	281	16.5	N/A
Turnout		1,698	36.03	
Labour gain from Conservative				
Labour gain from Independent				

== By-elections ==
=== Buckingham ===
Buckingham by-election: 19 June 2025
Party	Candidate	Votes	%	±%
Labour	Kate Davis	609	43.6	–7.3
Reform	Mike Mendoza	311	22.3	N/A
Conservative	Leila Yasmin Powell Williams	301	21.6	–10.1
Liberal Democrats	Ian Jones	153	11.0	–1.2
Britain First	David Bamber	22	1.6	N/A
Majority		298	21.3	N/A
Rejected ballots		3	0.22	
Turnout		1,396	45.4	+1.4
Labour hold				

The Buckingham by-election was triggered by the death of councillor Nigel Jenner.
