= Milvik =

Swedish microinsurance company

- Company type: Private
- Industry: Microinsurance
- Founded: 2010; 16 years ago
- Headquarters: Singapore
- Website: bimamilvik.com

MILVIK BIMA, which operates under the brand name 'BIMA' or 'MILVIK' is a Swedish Fintech company related health services, such as life and health insurance via a mobile app to middle class families in emerging countries. It runs its business from headquarters in Singapore and Bangalore with operations in nine countries.

It operates in Bangladesh, Cambodia, Ghana, Indonesia, Pakistan, Philippines, Sri Lanka and Tanzania with 37 million users.

== History ==
The company was founded in 2010 by Gustaf Agartson in Ghana. During pre-launch conversations with potential customers, Agartson asked audiences who typically would not buy insurance what motivated their decision to buy. Agartson's solution was to get rid of almost all exclusions, and add minimal requirements to plans.

It was originally created to provide insurance by leveraging increased smartphone penetration and the spread of e-wallets, it later widened its services to include telemedicine consultation and other health solutions. Since its founding, it has seen revenues grow at a 63% CAGR. According to Milvik, its addressable market based on the countries it is located in was 500 million. Its founder, Gustaf Agartson, believes that insurance and healthcare in emerging markets is a major opportunity.

In 2012, Milvik expanded into Asia, with its first Asian market being Bangladesh. Since then, it has expanded its services to nine countries in total, with seven being in Asia and two in Africa. A key part of its insurance business is integrating with digital wallets, allowing for frictionless and remote payments, an innovation at that time.

In 2021, Sønr Global, an insuretech scouting company named BIMA in the top 20 of its global insuretech company rankings. Its "Fintech for Health Platform and Health Wallet" was shortlisted for the semifinals of Most Promising Innovation at the Techblazer Awards 2021, a competition organised by the Singapore IMDA and SGTech.

In August 2021, it saw its Bangladesh market grow 20% month on month in the 12 months prior, and a 25% uptick in customer retention and loyalty in quarter two of 2021.

== Operations ==
Its health platform include telemedicine and other services, along with its original insurance plans. Due to the small nature of its plans, it uses a recurring subscription business model.

Partnerships with labs and telemedicine providers have allowed it to offer specialist care for paediatrics, women's health, diabetes and heart disease, while its partnerships with labs allow for ease in testing, conducting health screenings and delivering prescriptions.
