= Beccy Cooper =

British politician

Beccy Cooper MP
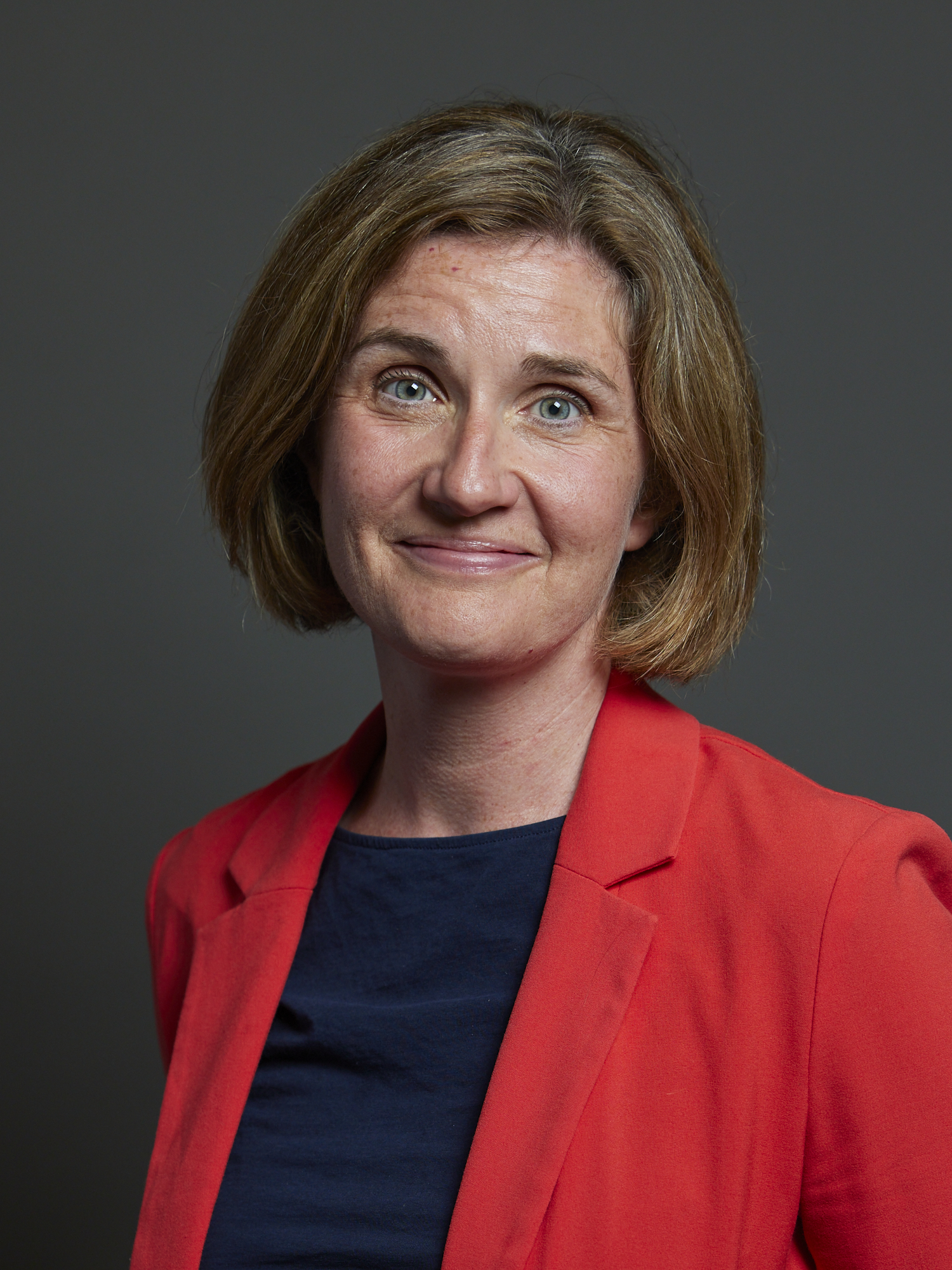
- Official portrait, 2024

Member of Parliament for Worthing West
- Incumbent
- Assumed office 4 July 2024
- Preceded by: Peter Bottomley
- Majority: 3,949 (7.7%)

Leader of Worthing Borough Council
- In office 20 May 2022 – 10 July 2024
- Preceded by: Kevin Jenkins
- Succeeded by: Sophie Cox

Member of the Worthing Borough Council from Marine Ward
- In office 20 May 2017 – 10 July 2024

Parliamentary Private Secretary to the Cabinet Office
- Incumbent
- Assumed office 27 July 2026
- Preceded by: Sean Woodcock

Personal details
- Born: Rebecca Claire Cooper
- Party: Labour
- Education: University of Sheffield
- Website: Official website

Rebecca Claire Cooper is a British politician and public health consultant who has been the Member of Parliament for Worthing West since July 2024. She was leader of Worthing Borough Council from 2022 to 2024.

== Career ==
Cooper studied medicine at Sheffield Medical School, graduating in 2002. After working as a resident doctor at Oxford University Hospitals NHS Foundation Trust and for the locum agency Medacs, she worked for the Christian children's charity World Vision International between 2006 and 2008. Cooper then chose to specialise in public health and completed a specialty training programme at the Oxford School for Public Health and became a consultant in 2014. She worked as a public health consultant for Oxfordshire County Council initially before moving to the healthcare technology firm Solutions4Health where she worked between 2015 and 2019. Cooper then worked for Swedish fintech company Milvik part-time till 2023 as a healthcare pathway and programme manager.

A member of the Labour Party, Cooper became the first councillor for the party in Worthing Borough Council for over 40 years by winning the 2017 by-election for the Marine ward. She became leader of the council in 2022 and chair of the Greater Brighton Economic Board between 2023 and 2024.

== Parliamentary Career ==
In 2024, Cooper was elected as MP for Worthing West with a majority of 3,949 over incumbent Conservative MP and then-Father of the House Peter Bottomley, having previously contested the seat unsuccessfully in 2017 and 2019.

Since 2024, Cooper has served as a member of the Health and Social Care Select Committee.

On the 27th of July 2026 she was appointed as a Parliamentary Private Secretary to the Cabinet Office

Cooper supports assisted suicide and voted in favour of the Terminally Ill Adults (End of Life) Bill in 2025, which proposes to legalise it in the UK.

Cooper is one of seven leaders of the revived Tribune Group of Labour MPs.
