= Adur District =

Local government district in West Sussex, England

Coordinates: 50.8326°N 0.2689°W

- Non-metropolitan district
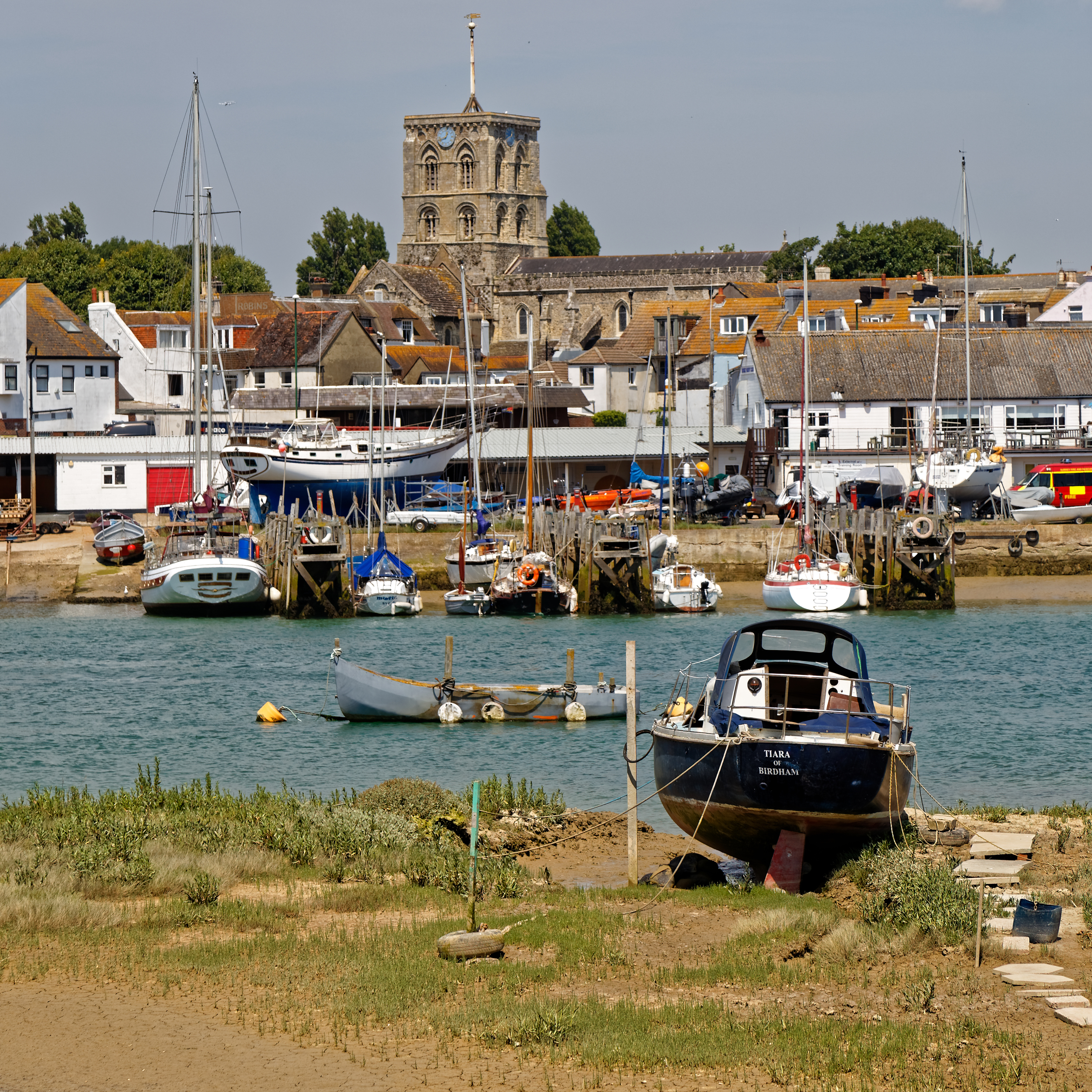
- River Adur at Shoreham-by-Sea

- Adur shown within West Sussex
- Sovereign state: United Kingdom
- Constituent country: England
- Region: South East England
- Non-metropolitan county: West Sussex
- Status: Non-metropolitan district
- Admin HQ: Shoreham-by-Sea
- Incorporated: 1 April 1974

Government
  - Type: Non-metropolitan district council
  - Body: Adur District Council
  - MPs: Tom Rutland (Lab)

Area
  - Total: 16.14 sq mi (41.80 km^{2})
  - Rank: 256th (of 296)

Population (2024)
  - Total: 64,889
  - Rank: 290th (of 296)
  - Density: 4,021/sq mi (1,552/km^{2})

Ethnicity (2021)
  - Ethnic groups: List: 93.4% White; 2.5% Mixed; 2.2% Asian; 1.1% other; 0.8% Black

Religion (2021)
  - Religion: List: 47.9% no religion; 43.1% Christianity; 5.9% not stated; 1.3% Islam; 0.6% other; 0.4% Buddhism; 0.4% Judaism; 0.3% Hinduism; 0.1% Sikhism
- Time zone: UTC0 (GMT)
  - Summer (DST): UTC+1 (BST)
- ONS code: 45UB
- GSS code: E07000223
- OS grid reference: TQ220051

Adur (/ˈeɪdər/) is a local government district in West Sussex, England. It is named after the River Adur which flows through the area. The council is based in the town of Shoreham-by-Sea, and the district also contains the town of Southwick, the large village of Lancing and a modest rural hinterland inland. The district had a population of 64,626 at the 2021 census.

Sompting, Lancing, Shoreham and Southwick form a strip of settlements on the south coast, between Worthing and Brighton collectively known as the Brighton/Worthing/Littlehampton conurbation. Shoreham Airport is located in the Adur district, west of Shoreham-by-Sea and just east of Lancing.

The Adur Festival is held in the first two weeks of June every year.

The district lies on the south coast, and parts of its area lie within the South Downs National Park. The neighbouring districts are Worthing, Arun, Horsham and Brighton and Hove.

== History ==
The district was formed on 1 April 1974 under the Local Government Act 1972. The new district covered the whole area of two former districts and parts of a third, which were all abolished at the same time:

- Shoreham-by-Sea Urban District
- Southwick Urban District
- Worthing Rural District (parishes of Coombes, Lancing and Sompting only, rest went to Arun)

The new district was named Adur after the River Adur which flows through the area and reaches the sea at Shoreham.

Since 2008 Adur District Council has worked in partnership with neighbouring Worthing Borough Council, as Adur and Worthing Councils, sharing a joint management structure, with a single chief executive.

== Governance ==
Adur District Council

Type
- Type: Non-metropolitan district

History
- Founded: 1 April 1974

Leadership
- Chair: Julia Watts, Independent since 21 May 2026
- Leader: Jeremy Gardner, Labour since 23 May 2024
- Chief Executive: Paul Brewer since July 2025

Structure
- Seats: 29 councillors
- Political groups: Administration (17) Labour (17) Other parties (12) Reform (6) Independent (4) Green (2)
- Length of term: 4 years

Elections
- Last election: May 2026
- Next election: May 2028

Meeting place
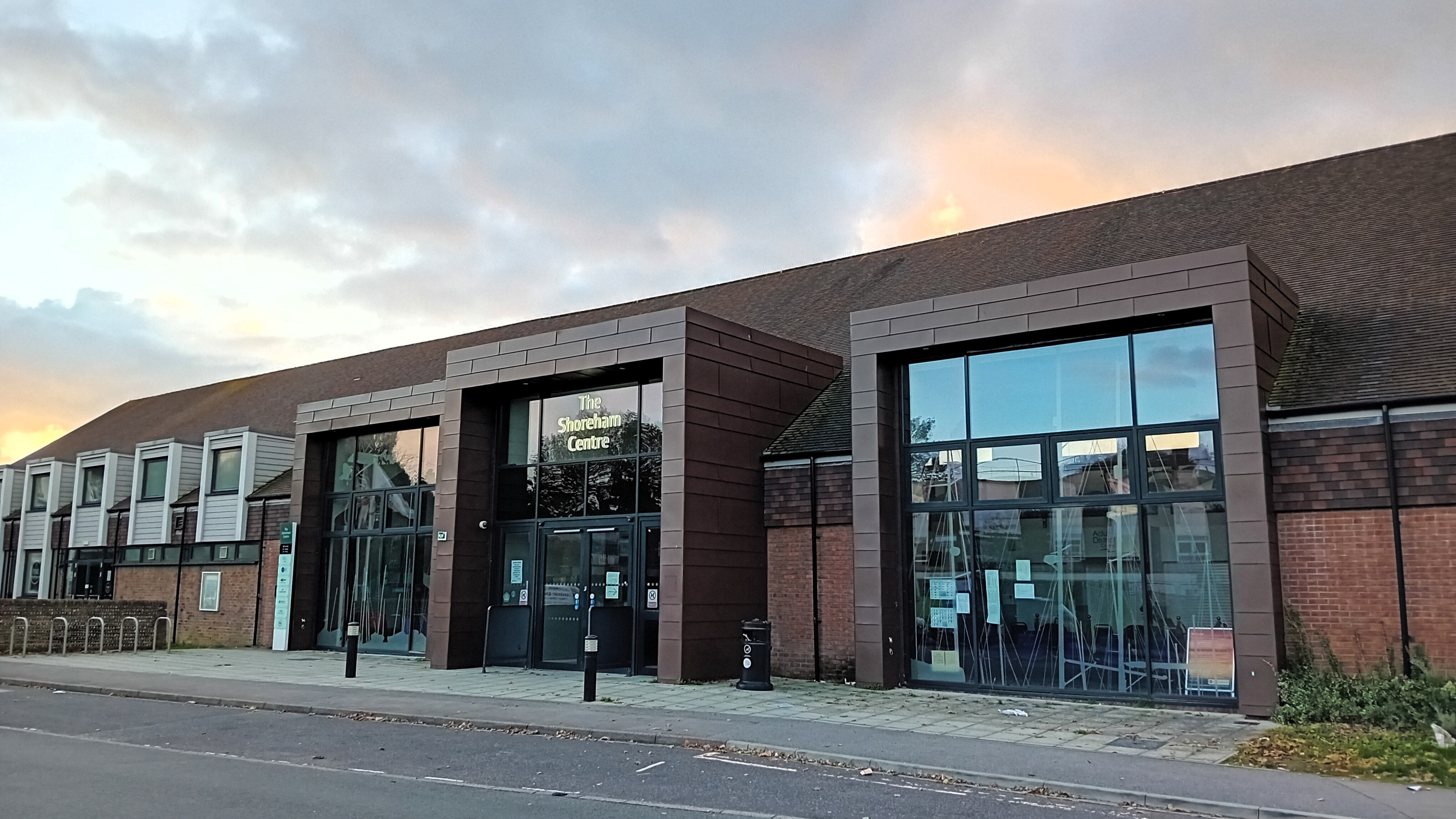
- The Shoreham Centre, Pond Road, Shoreham-by-Sea, BN43 5WU

Website
- www.adur-worthing.gov.uk

Adur District Council provides district-level services. County-level services are provided by West Sussex County Council. Parts of the district are covered by civil parishes, which form a third tier of local government for their areas.

=== Political control ===
The council has been under Labour majority control since the 2024 election.

The first elections to the council were held in 1973, initially operating as a shadow authority alongside the outgoing authorities until the new arrangements came into effect on 1 April 1974. Political control of the council since 1974 has been as follows:

Party in control	Years
No overall control	1974–1979
Conservative	1979–1980
Liberal	1980–1983
No overall control	1983–1986
Alliance	1986–1988
Liberal Democrats	1988–1999
No overall control	1999–2002
Conservative	2002–2024
Labour	2024-current

=== Leadership ===
The leaders of the council since 2000 have been:

Councillor	Party	From	To
Neil Parkin	Conservative	2000	May 2024
Jeremy Gardner	Labour	23 May 2024	

=== Composition ===
Following the 2026 election, the composition of the council was:

Party	Councillors
Labour	17
Reform	6
Independent	4
Green	2
Total	29

The next election is due in 2028.

=== Elections ===
Since the last boundary changes in 2004 the council has comprised 29 councillors representing 14 wards, with each ward electing two councillors except Widewater, which elects three. Elections are held in alternate years for roughly half the council each time to serve a four year term of office.

=== Premises ===
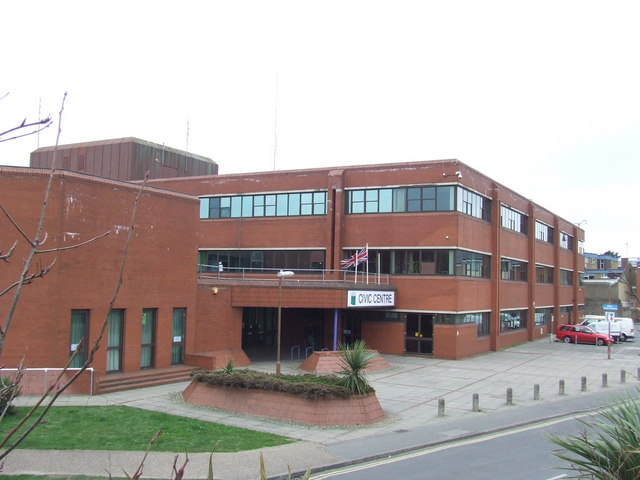
Council's former headquarters at Shoreham Civic Centre, closed 2015 and since demolished.

The council is based at the Shoreham Centre on Pond Road, which was built in the 1970s as a community centre but was substantially extended in 2015 to also serve as the council's meeting place and offices. Prior to 2015 the council was based at the Civic Centre on Ham Road, Shoreham, which was subsequently demolished.

Adur population pyramid

== Towns and parishes ==
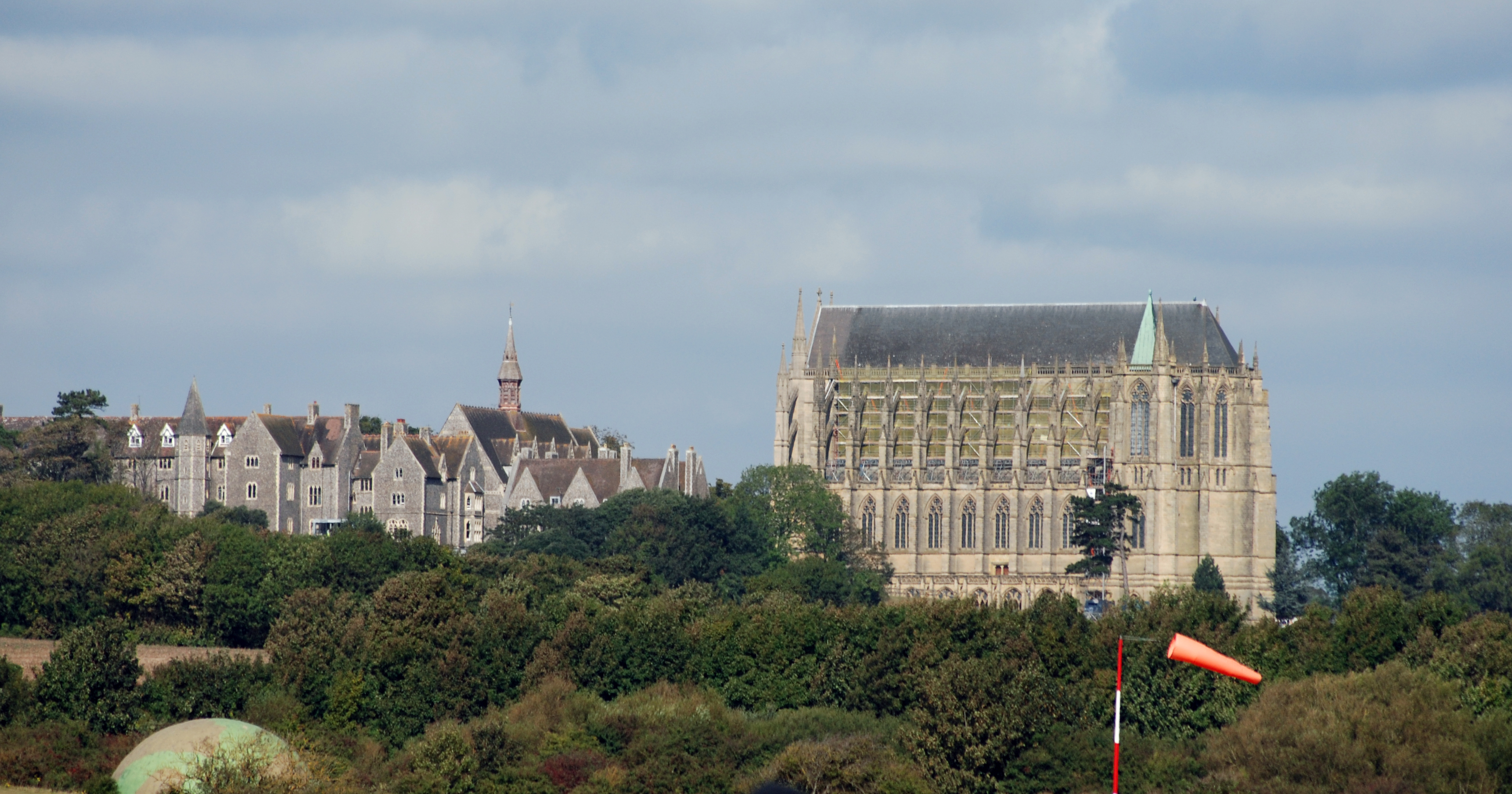
Lancing College, a public school and a prominent landmark in the district.

There are three civil parishes in the district, being Coombes, Lancing, and Sompting. Coombes has a parish meeting rather than a parish council due to its low population. The rest of the district, corresponding to the area of the pre-1974 urban districts of Shoreham-by-Sea and Southwick, is an unparished area.

== Sports clubs ==
- Lancing F.C.
- Shoreham F.C.
- Southwick F.C.
- Lancing Utd F.C.

== Media ==
In terms of television, Adur is served by BBC South East and ITV Meridian broadcasting from the Whitehawk Hill transmitter.

Radio stations for the area are BBC Radio Sussex, Heart South, Capital Brighton, More Radio Worthing and Seaside Hospital Radio that broadcast from the Southlands Hospital in Shoreham.

Local newspapers are the Shoreham Herald, West Sussex Gazette and The Argus.

== Twin towns ==
Adur is twinned with

- Żywiec, Poland
- Riom, France

== Climate ==
Climate in this area has mild differences between highs and lows, and there is adequate rainfall year-round. The Köppen Climate Classification subtype for this climate is "Cfb" (Marine West Coast Climate/Oceanic climate).

Climate data for Adur District, UK
Month	Jan	Feb	Mar	Apr	May	Jun	Jul	Aug	Sep	Oct	Nov	Dec	Year
Mean daily maximum °C (°F)	8 (46)	8 (46)	10 (50)	13 (55)	16 (61)	18 (64)	20 (68)	21 (70)	19 (66)	15 (59)	11 (52)	8 (46)	14 (57)
Mean daily minimum °C (°F)	3 (37)	3 (37)	5 (41)	6 (43)	10 (50)	12 (54)	14 (57)	14 (57)	12 (54)	9 (48)	6 (43)	4 (39)	8 (46)
Average precipitation mm (inches)	43 (1.7)	30 (1.2)	30 (1.2)	28 (1.1)	36 (1.4)	18 (0.7)	36 (1.4)	36 (1.4)	38 (1.5)	51 (2)	51 (2)	48 (1.9)	440 (17.4)
Average precipitation days	14	10	12	12	10	9	10	10	11	12	13	12	135
Source: Weatherbase

== See also ==
- Adur and Worthing Councils
- Listed buildings in Adur
- List of places of worship in Adur
- Lancing
- Shoreham-by-Sea
- Southwick
- Sompting
