= Vandalian Tower =

Coordinates: 50°57′30″N 0°53′00″W

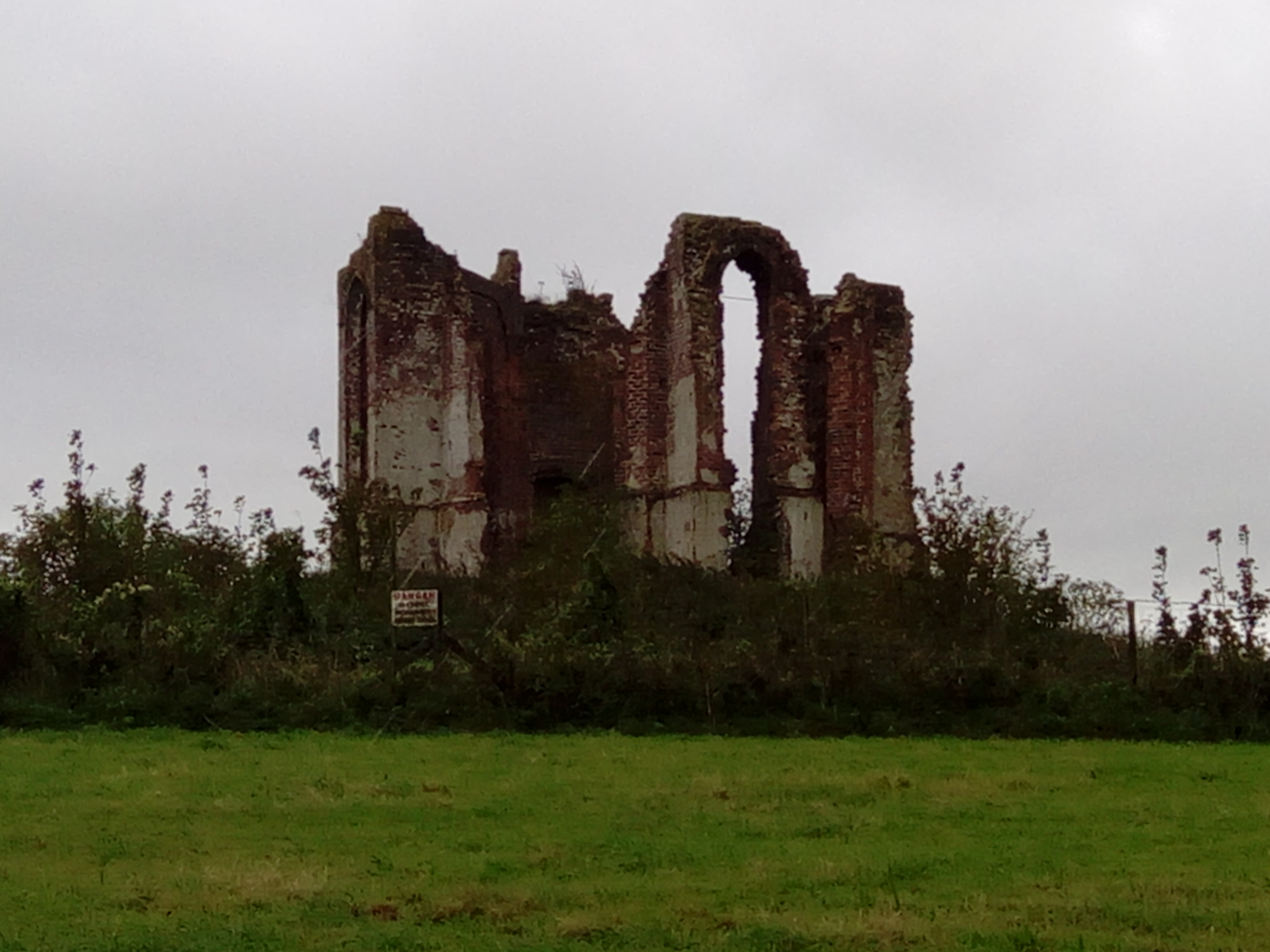

General information
- Status: Ruin
- Completed: 1774

Design and construction
- Architect: Henry Keene

The Vandalian Tower at Harting, West Sussex, England, is an 18th-century folly, built to commemorate the British colony of Vandalia, a short-lived colony that disappeared with the spread of America. It sits on the summit of Tower Hill.

Today the ruin is owned by the descendants of the Fetherstonhaugh family who bought the neighbouring estate of Uppark, now owned by the National Trust. It was listed as a scheduled monument in 1976.

== History ==
The tower was built in 1774, designed by English architect Henry Keene for Sir Matthew Fetherstonhaugh, to celebrate the founding of the colony of Vandalia. The tower was quickly abandoned, possibly out of embarrassment of the failure of Vandalia.

In the late 18th century, Emma Hamilton is said to have frequently watched, from the tower, for Lord Nelson's ship arriving. This led to it being referred to by locals as "Lady Hamilton's Folly," The tower was partly destroyed by fire in 1842 and the ruins were stabilised in 1982.

== Gallery ==
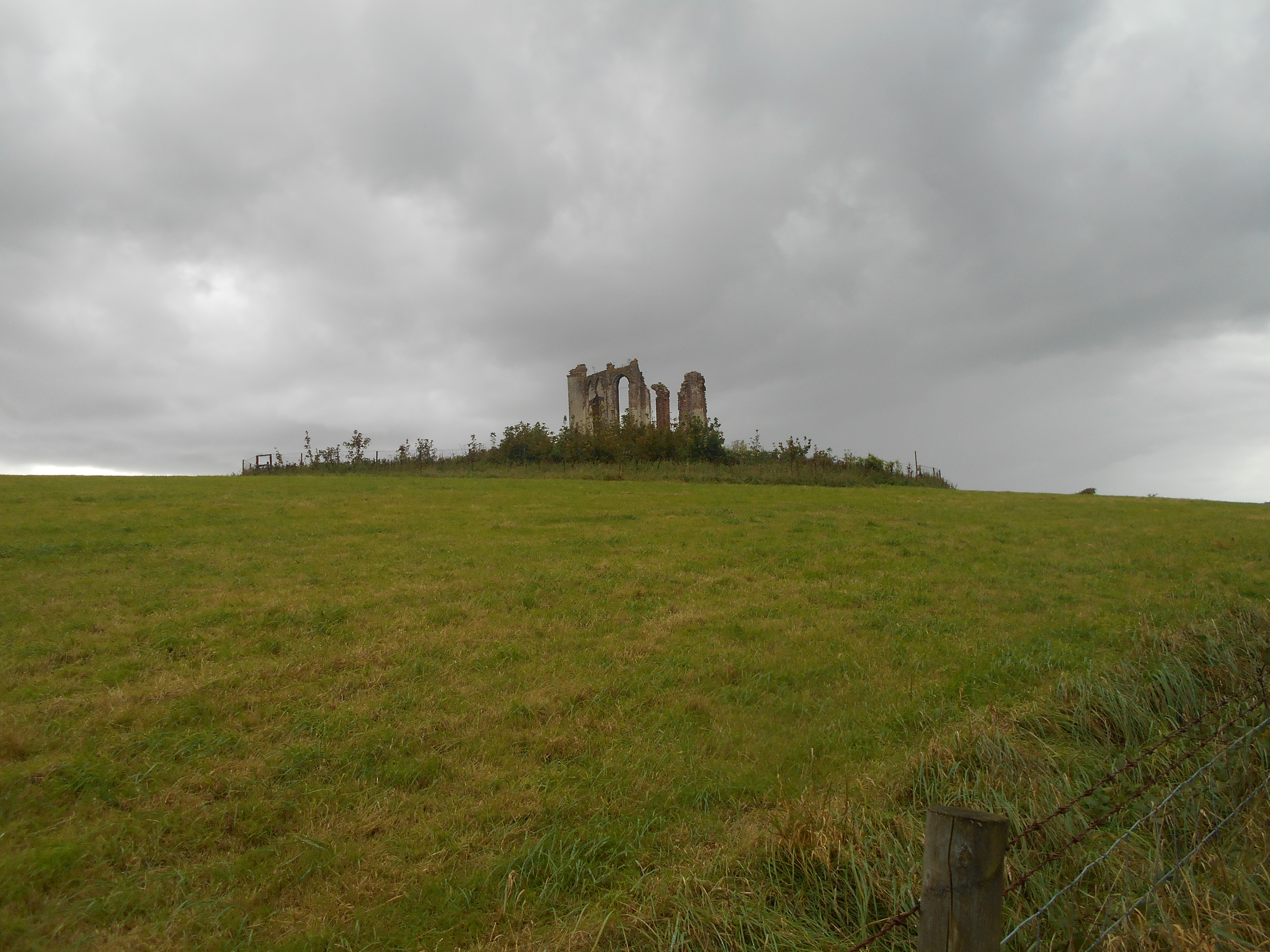

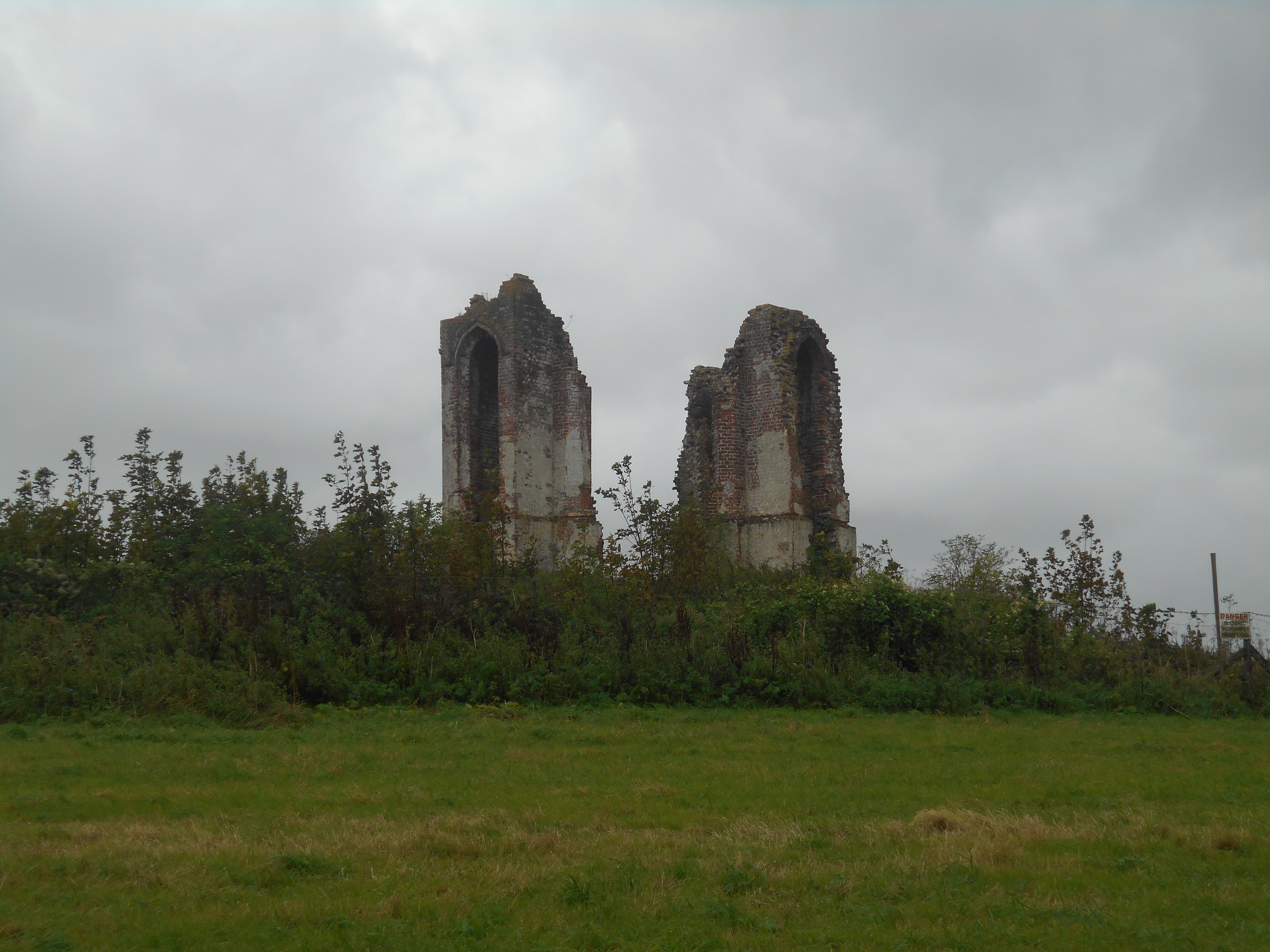
