= Henry Fetherstonhaugh =

English aristocrat

Sir Henry Fetherstonhaugh, 2nd Baronet (22 December 1754 – 24 October 1846), known as Harry, was an English aristocrat.

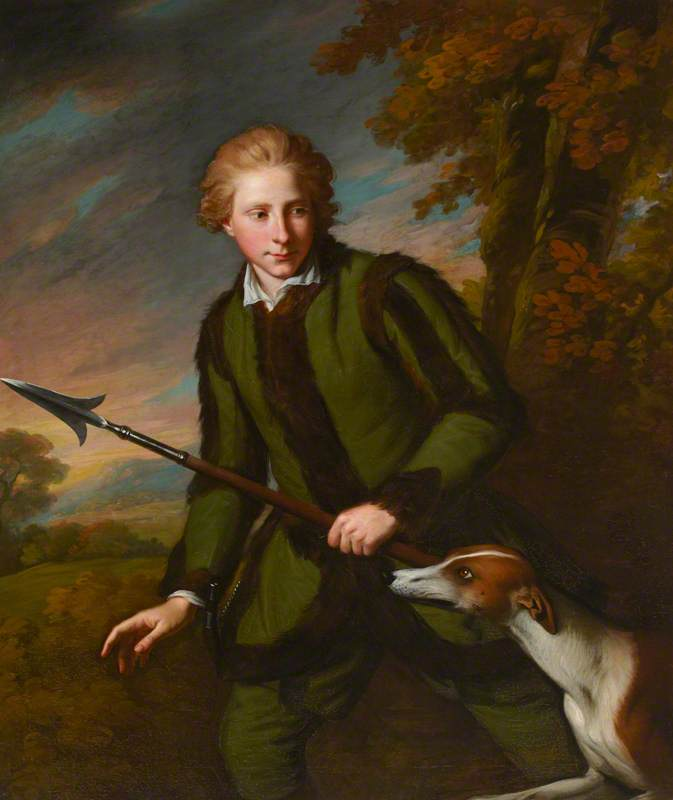
Fetherstonhaugh as a boy, by Nathaniel Dance-Holland

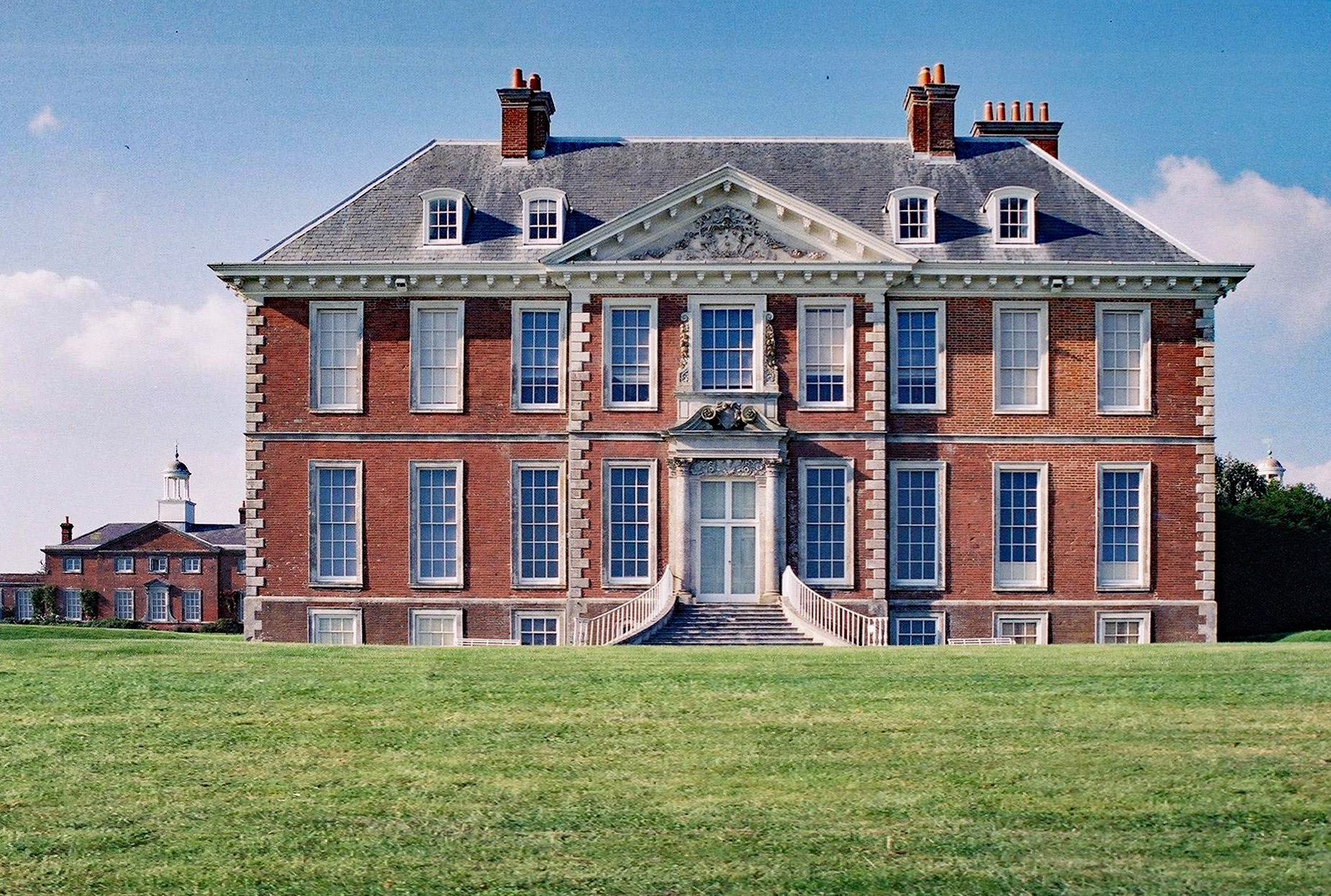
Uppark

The son of Sir Matthew Fetherstonhaugh Bt MP FRS, he was educated at Eton College and University College, Oxford.

He made the Grand Tour in 1775-76 but passed most of it in sexual and hunting adventures. Like his parents and uncle 25 years earlier, he was painted by Pompeo Batoni in Rome, and later employed Humphry Repton to lay out the gardens to his country manor, Uppark.

He was the Member of Parliament for Portsmouth from 1782 to 1796, but never once spoke in the House of Commons, and has been described as a "witless playboy".

Sir Harry was a good friend of the Prince of Wales (later King George IV), who stayed at Uppark during the mid-1780s. He took the teenaged Emma Hamilton as a mistress to live with him at Uppark in 1780 and to entertain his guests at the many parties he hosted, but rejected her when she became pregnant with his child in 1781. A frequent guest at Uppark, Charles Greville, took her in as his mistress on condition that the child, Emma Carew, was fostered out.

On 12 September 1825, when over 70, Fetherstonhaugh married Mary Ann Bullock, his head dairy maid, aged 18 or 21, and upon his death left his entire estate to her. After her husband's death Mary Ann continued living at Uppark with her sister, Frances (b. 1817).

Baronetage of Great Britain
Preceded by Matthew Fetherstonhaugh	Baronet (of Fetherstonhaugh); 1774–1846	Extinct
