= Matthew Fetherstonhaugh =

English politician and landowner

Sir Matthew Fetherstonhaugh, 1st Baronet FRS (c. 1714 – 18 March 1774) was an English politician and landowner.

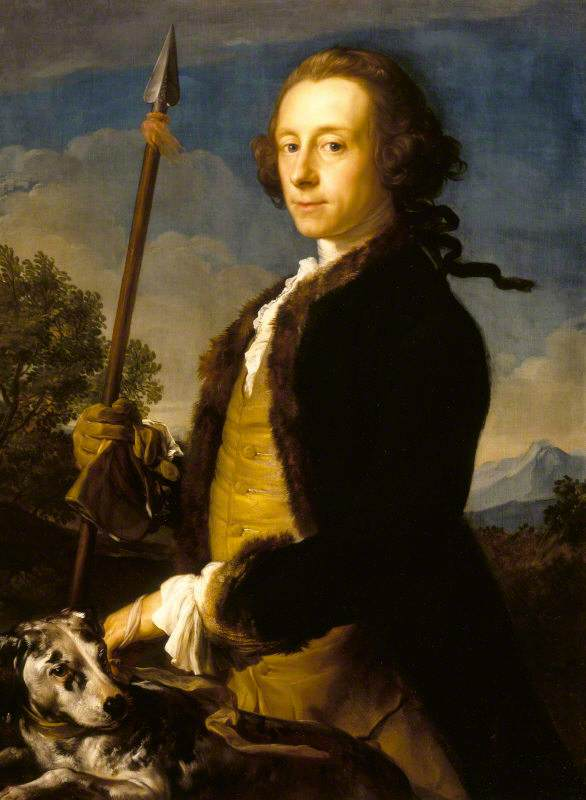
A portrait of Featherstonhaugh by Pompeo Batoni

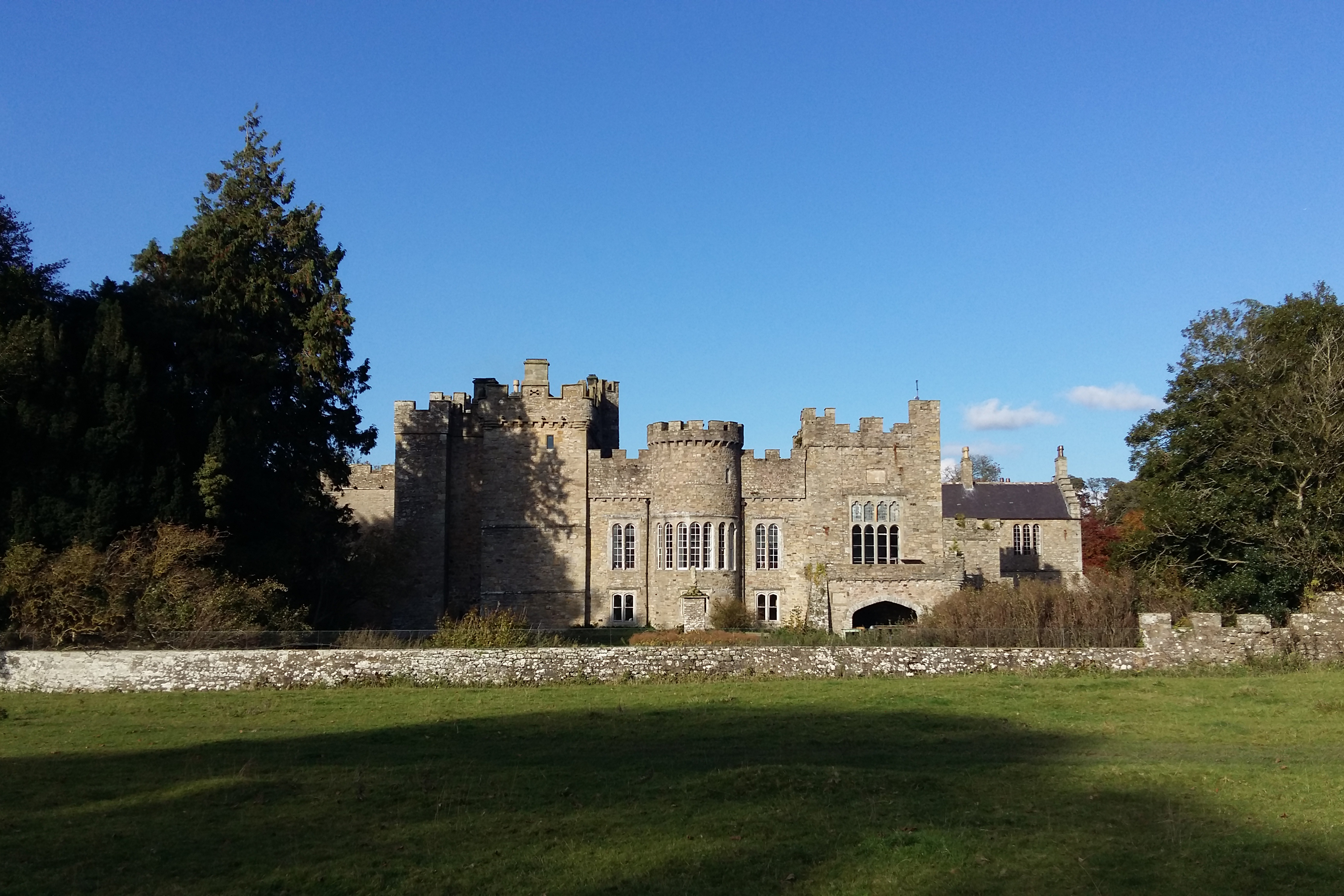
Featherstone Castle

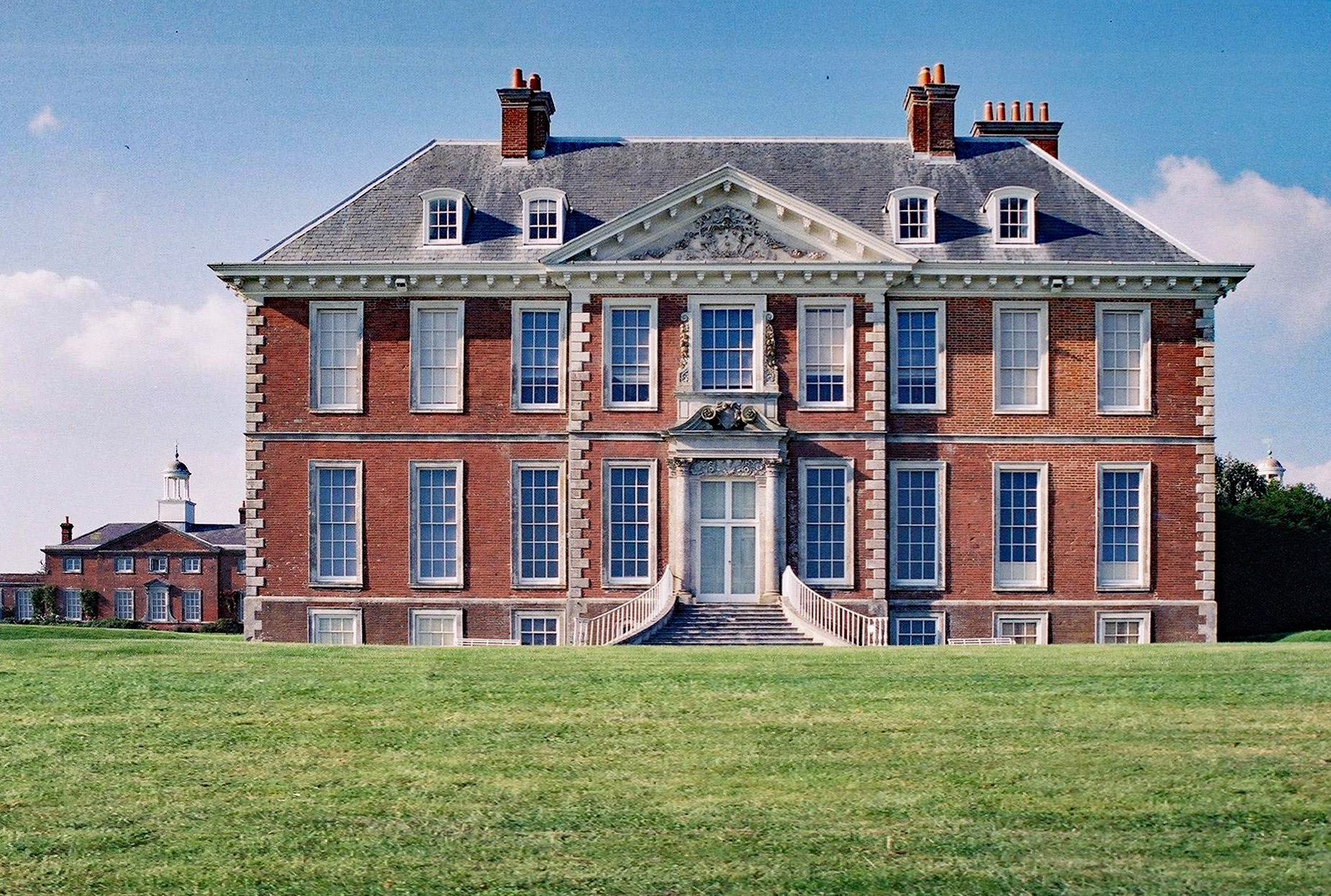
Uppark

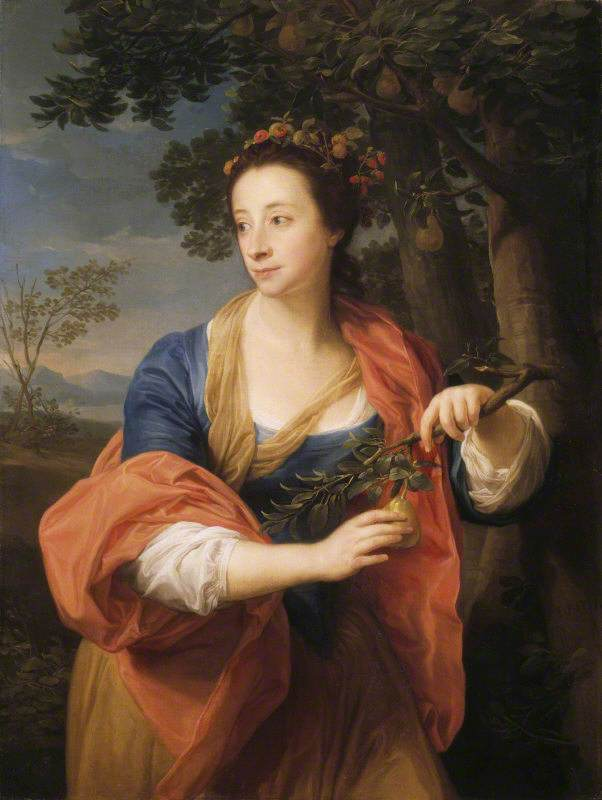
Sarah Lethieullier Lady Fetherstonhaugh by Pompeo Batoni

He was the son of Matthew Fetherstonhaugh of Featherstone Castle, Northumberland. In 1746, he inherited the estates of a kinsman Sir Henry Fetherston but not Sir Henry's baronetcy which became extinct on his death. However, on 3 January 1747, Fetherstonhaugh was created a baronet of Featherstonehaugh in the County of Northumberland, in the Baronetage of Great Britain.

On his marriage to Sarah Lethieullier, sister of Benjamin Lethieullier, in December 1746, he bought Uppark, Sussex and the manors of East And West Harting and in 1747 sold the family estate at Featherstone to James Wallace. Between 1748 and 1753 he undertook the Grand Tour with his brother-in-law Benjamin Lethieullier and his step brother-in-law Lascelles Iremonger. They brought back to Uppark an impressive collection of Italian art.

In February 1752, Fetherstonhaugh was elected Fellow of the Royal Society, as 'A gentleman of literature and improvement, and versed in natural knowledge'. He was proposed by Willoughby de Parham, James Burrow, Peter Davall, Israel Mauduit and James Theobald.

He served as a Member of Parliament (MP) for Morpeth from 1755 to 1761 and for Portsmouth from 1762 to 1774. In the 1750s he commissioned architect James Paine to design and build Dover House, Whitehall, London.

He was succeeded by his son, Henry.

In 1774, he commissioned Vandalian Tower.

== Sources ==
- A History of Northumberland (1840) John Hodgson Pt 2 Vol 3 p355
- Leigh Rayment's list of baronets

Parliament of Great Britain
Preceded by Robert Ord; Thomas Duncombe	Member of Parliament for Morpeth; 1755–1761; With: Thomas Duncombe	Succeeded by Viscount Garlies; Thomas Duncombe
Preceded by Sir William Rowley; Sir Edward Hawke	Member of Parliament for Portsmouth; 1761–1774; With: Sir Edward Hawke	Succeeded by Peter Taylor; Sir Edward Hawke
Baronetage of Great Britain
New creation	Baronet (of Fetherstonhaugh); 1747–1774	Succeeded by Henry Fetherstonhaugh
