= Emma, Lady Hamilton =

Mistress of Lord Nelson (1765–1815)

Emma Hamilton
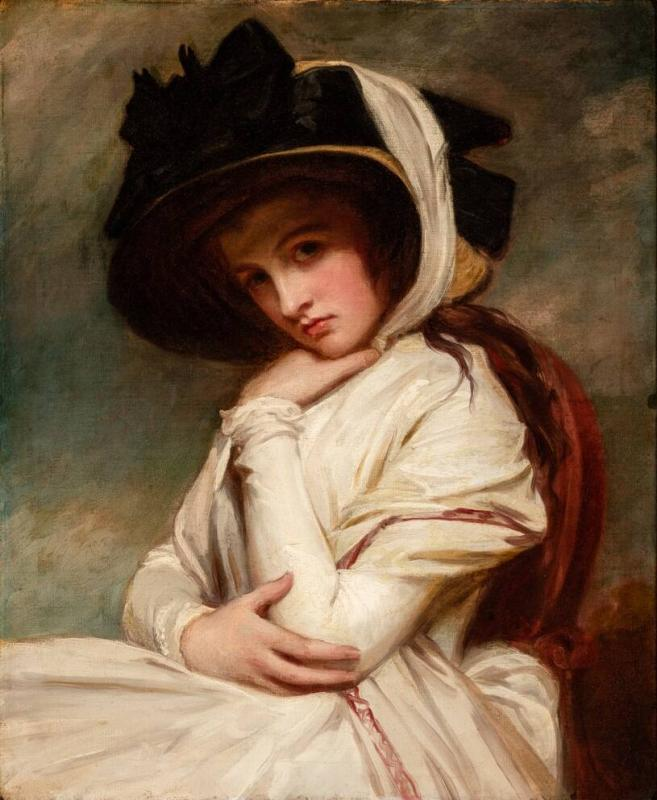
- Portrait as a girl (aged seventeen) by George Romney, c. 1782
- Born: Amy Lyon; 26 April 1765; Ness, Cheshire, England
- Died: 15 January 1815 (aged 49); Calais, France
- Other name: Emma Hart
- Known for: Mistress of Lord Nelson
- Title: Lady Hamilton (a courtesy title as the wife of a British knight, from 1791); Dame Emma Hamilton (a title in her own right as a female member of the Sovereign Military Order of Malta, from 1800) (Note: See the Honours section below.)
- Spouse: Sir William Hamilton (m. 1791; died 1803)
- Children: Emma Carew; Horatia Nelson

Emma, Lady Hamilton (born Amy Lyon; 26 April 1765 – 15 January 1815), was an English courtesan, remembered as the mistress of naval hero Lord Nelson and the muse of artist George Romney.

Emma was born in the village of Ness in Cheshire, the daughter of a blacksmith. Her father died soon after her birth and she was raised by her mother and grandmother in the nearby village of Hawarden. At the age of twelve, she followed her mother to London and, after briefly working as a domestic servant, drifted into the capital's demi-monde. By the age of fifteen she was the mistress of a young aristocrat, Sir Harry Fetherstonhaugh, who abandoned her when she became pregnant. She and her mother were taken in by Charles Francis Greville, who set them up in a house off the Edgware Road. Emma became known as Emma Hart and her mother as Mrs Cadogan. Emma's daughter was sent to Hawarden to be raised by her great-grandmother. It was during this period that Emma sat for numerous portraits by George Romney.

After a few years, Greville tired of Emma and sent her and her mother to his uncle, Sir William Hamilton, British ambassador to the Kingdom of Naples. She became Hamilton's mistress and a society hostess, famed for her performances of "Attitudes" where she struck poses from antiquity. In 1791, Hamilton and Emma were quietly married in St Marylebone Parish Church. With her new-found respectability as the ambassador's wife, she was able to attend the court in Naples and she became a friend of Queen Maria Carolina. Nelson arrived in Naples after his victory at the Battle of the Nile in August 1798 and soon embarked on an affair with Emma. The Hamiltons and Nelson returned to England in 1800 and set up a ménage à trois in London and at a country house in Merton bought by Nelson. Emma gave birth to Nelson's daughter, Horatia, in 1801. William Hamilton died in 1803, but Nelson and Emma were unable to marry as Nelson was still married to his wife Fanny. After Nelson's death at the Battle of Trafalgar in 1805, Emma, who had been provided for in the wills of both her husband and her lover, continued an extravagant lifestyle and fell into debt. In 1814, in order to escape her creditors, she fled to Calais with Horatia and died there six months later.

Although largely ignored during the rest of the nineteenth century, Emma was the subject of biographies in 1888 and 1905. In more recent years, her rags to riches story and love affair with Nelson has inspired historical fiction, drama and films as well as further biographies.

== Early life ==
Emma was born Amy Lyon on 26 April 1765 in the mining village of Ness on the Wirral Peninsula. She was baptised on 12 May 1765 in St Mary's and St Helen's Church in Neston. Her father, blacksmith Henry Lyon, died when she was two months old, and her mother, Mary Kidd, took Emma to live with her family in Hawarden, across the River Dee from Ness. She was raised by her mother and her grandmother, Sarah Kidd, who ran a carrier's business. Little is known of Emma's childhood, but at the age of twelve she began work as an under-nursemaid at Hawarden, in the household of local doctor John Thomas, father of Honoratus Leigh Thomas

== London 1777–1785 ==
In late 1777, after several months working in Hawarden, Emma followed her mother to London and worked as a nursery maid at the house of Dr Richard Budd in Chatham Place, Blackfriars. Also working as a servant in the household was the future actress Jane Powell. Emma's positions in London after leaving the Budd household became more difficult to establish with any certainty. According to the reminiscences of Henry Angelo, written in 1828 and not considered reliable, she was for a time a servant in the Linley household. Her work took her to Drury Lane theatre in Covent Garden, where Mrs Linley was costume mistress. Angelo then claims that Emma worked at a brothel run by Mrs Kelly in St James's. There was also a story, denied by Emma's friends, that she had worked for a time at the Temple of Health of Dr James Graham. While Emma's exact route into the demi-monde of London remains obscure, her life from 1781, when she became a "kept woman", is well documented.

At the age of fifteen or sixteen, in 1781, she came under the protection of a wealthy young baronet, Sir Harry Fetherstonhaugh, who installed her in a cottage on his Uppark country estate in Sussex. He taught her to ride and she took part in the private race meetings he held on the South Downs. She entertained his guests and is said to have danced naked on his dining room table. Fetherstonhaugh abandoned her when she became pregnant and she turned for help to one of his friends, Charles Greville, who was a Member of Parliament for the borough of Warwick and brother to the second Earl of Warwick.

Greville agreed to take Emma under his protection on the condition that she give up her child and bring only her mother with her. Greville, for his part, undertook to provide financial support for Emma's child. Emma's daughter, Emma Hart (later Carew), was born in early 1782 and sent to live with Emma's grandmother Sarah Kidd in Hawarden. At the age of three, after a visit to her mother in London, she was moved to the household of John Blackburn, a schoolmaster in Manchester, where she stayed until 1800. She then came to London and was a frequent visitor to her mother at Merton, before going to Italy with the help of funds from Harry Fetherstonhaugh. Little is known about her later life; she appears to have settled in Florence, where she died in 1856.

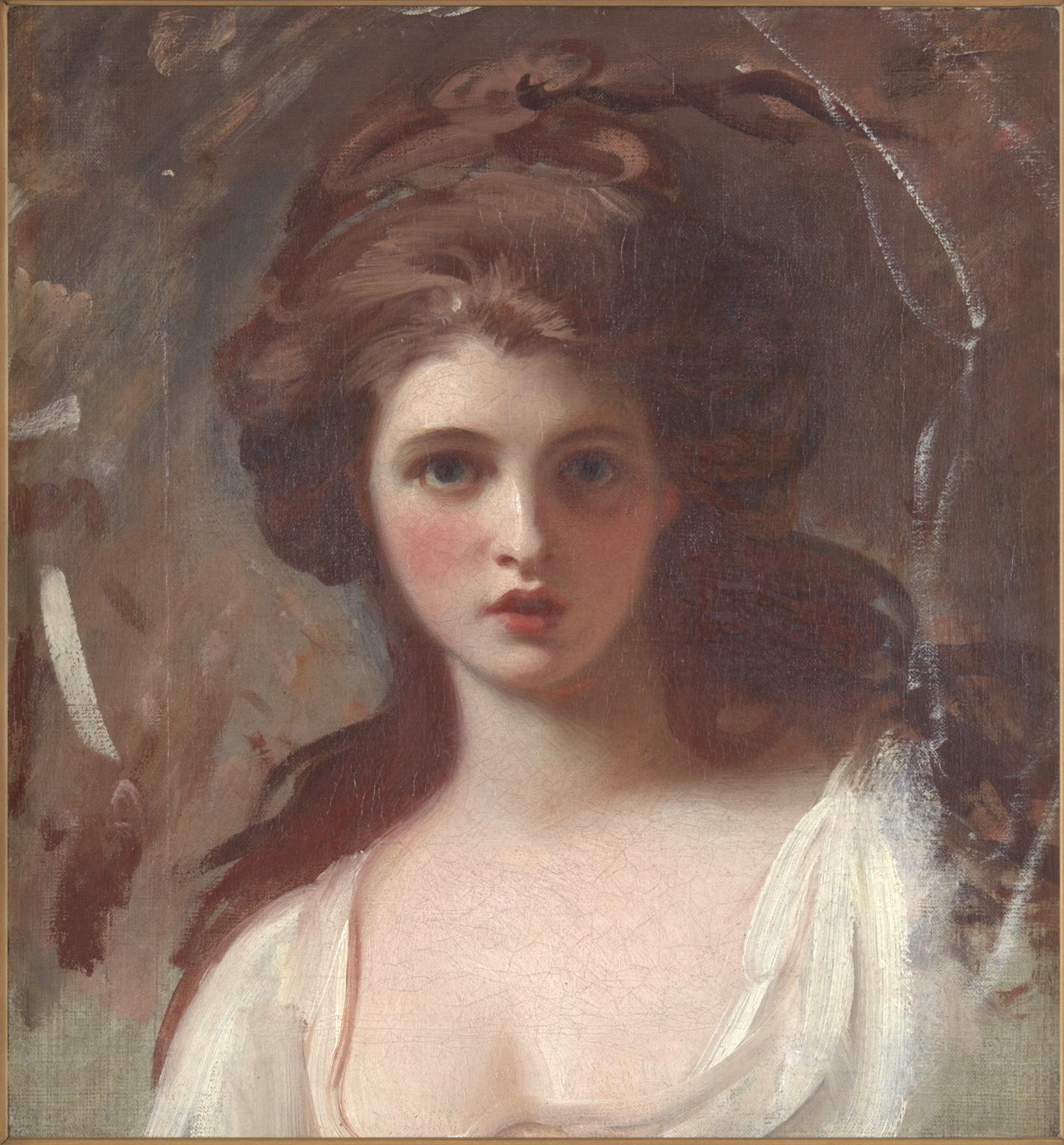
Emma as Circe, by George Romney, 1782

Greville installed Emma and her mother in a house at Edgware Row in Paddington Green, London, at that time a village on the outskirts of London. Emma changed her name to "Mrs Emma Hart" at the request of Greville while her mother, who acted as housekeeper and chaperone, adopted the name of "Mrs Cadogan". Greville provided Emma and her mother with two maids and a gardener. He expected Emma to abandon her former "giddy" ways and lead a modest and retired life. There were music lessons for Emma, and occasional supper parties with Greville's brother, Colonel "Wellbred" Greville, and friends. In 1784, Greville's uncle Sir William Hamilton visited and referred to Emma as "The Fair Tea-Maker of Edgware Row".

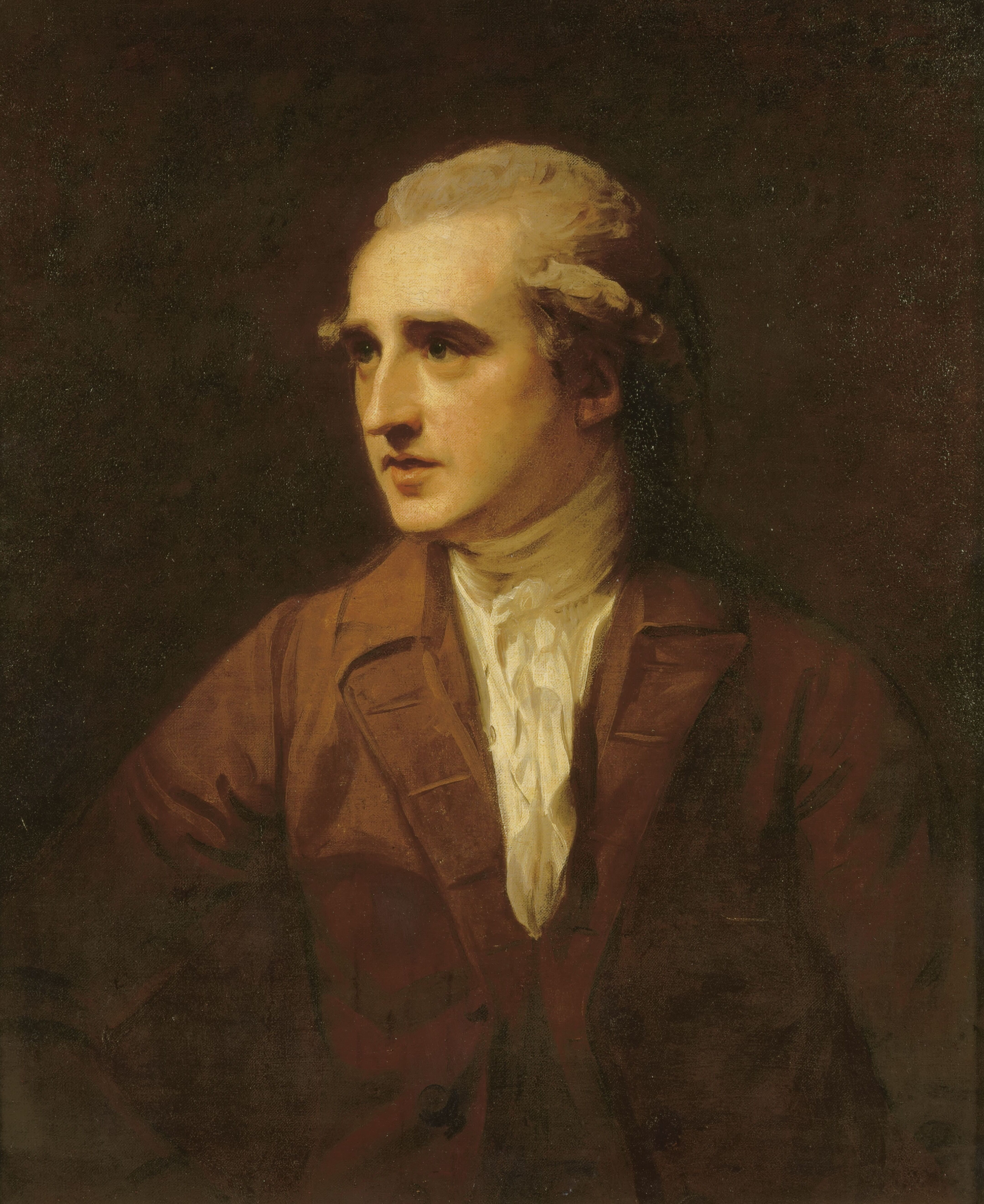
Charles Greville by George Romney c. 1781

Greville had an income of £500 a year, supplemented by dealing in art and antiquities. He commissioned a series of portraits of Emma from his friend, the portrait painter George Romney, in the hope of being able to sell the paintings at a profit. This hope never materialised and most of the paintings remained in Romney's possession. Emma first sat for Romney in the spring of 1782, soon after the birth of her daughter. On this occasion she posed as a figure from Greek mythology, Circe. Romney was impressed by Emma's beauty and ability to assume theatrical poses. Emma became Romney's muse and, over the next nine years, he completed over seventy paintings and sketches of her. Prints of Romney's portraits reached a wide audience and Emma became well-known. She was also painted by other artists, including Joshua Reynolds, John Hoppner, Thomas Lawrence and Élisabeth Vigée Le Brun.

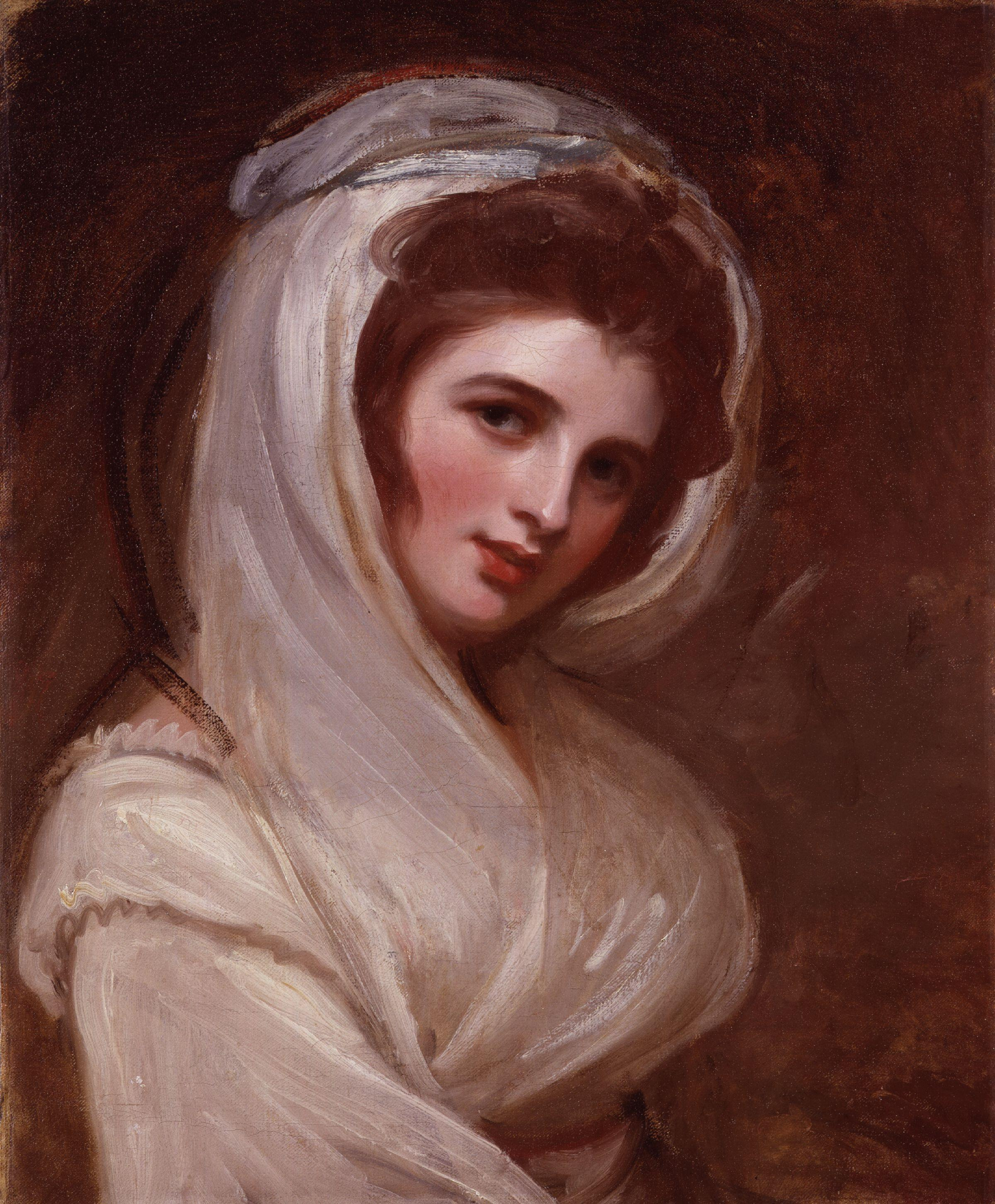
Portrait by George Romney, c. 1785

After a few years, Greville tired of Emma and saw her as an obstacle in his search for an heiress to marry, a search that was ultimately unsuccessful. He devised a plan to pass Emma on to his widowed uncle William Hamilton, who was the envoy extraordinary to the Kingdom of Naples. Hamilton was initially reluctant to agree to Greville's plan. While admiring Emma's beauty, he thought that, at the age of fifty-four, he was too old for her and offered an alternative, writing to Greville from Naples in June 1785: "My regard for E. is such that if she leaves you and retires to the country, which I suppose she would do was you to marry, I wou'd willingly make her an allowance of £50 a year till your circumstances eable you to provide better for her." Greville insisted, and Emma and her mother, who had recovered from a stroke, set off for Naples in March 1786. Emma had not been privy to the discussions between Greville, with whom she was still in love, and his uncle. She was under the impression that her stay in Naples would be a temporary one while Greville attended to business in Scotland, and that he would collect her from Naples in October.

== Naples 1786–1791 ==
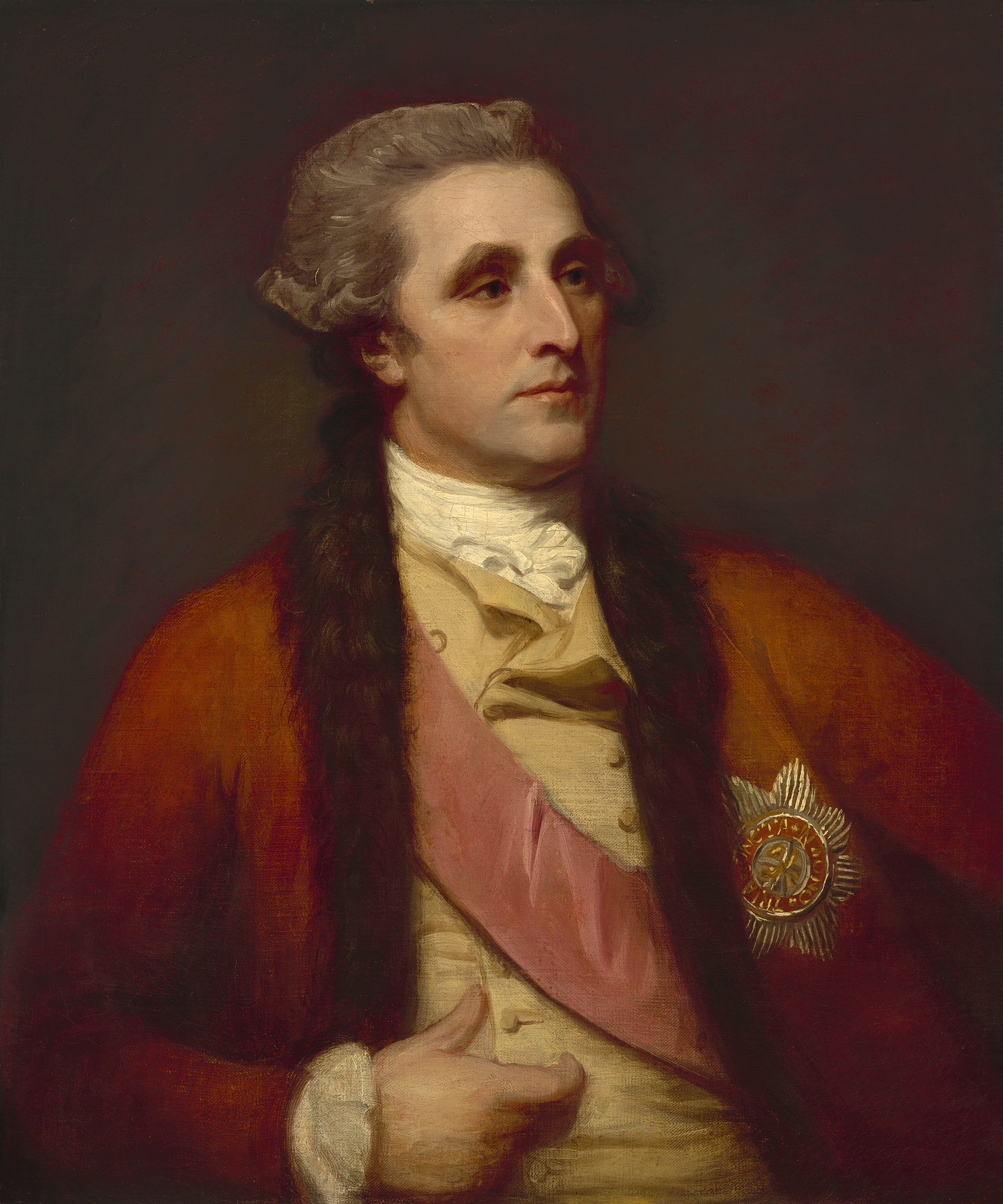
Sir William Hamilton by George Romney, 1783–84

Emma and her mother set off for Naples on 13 March 1786. After crossing the Channel, they travelled overland and arrived in Naples on Emma's birthday six weeks later. Hamilton provided Emma and her mother with their own apartment in his ambassadorial residence, the Palazzo Sessa. He arranged for her to sit for portraits and to have lessons in languages and music, took her sailing, and introduced her to Neapolitan society and English visitors. In spite of her realisation that Greville had no intention of coming to collect her in October, she refused Hamilton's advances, writing pleadingly to Greville that she was broken-hearted without him, and would never consent to be Hamilton's lover. Eventually, before the end of the year, she had a change of heart and became Hamilton's mistress.

The Attitudes

Emma moved into Hamilton's apartment in the Palazzo Sessa and spent the winter months in his country house near the Royal Palace of Caserta where King Ferdinand and Queen Maria Carolina spent the hunting season. Hamilton accompanied the king on hunting expeditions, but Emma could not be presented at court due to her status as a mistress. It was at Caserta that Emma and Hamilton developed her "Attitudes", a performance in which she draped herself in shawls and took up poses from classical art. One of the first visitors to describe the performance was Goethe:

[Hamilton] has had a Greek costume made for her which becomes her extremely. Dressed in this, she lets down her hair and, with a few shawls, gives so much variety to her poses, gestures, expression, etc., that the spectator can hardly believe his eyes. He sees what thousands of artists would have liked to express realized before him in movements and surprising transformations.... The old knight idolizes her and is quite enthusiastic about everything she does. In her he has found all the antiquities....

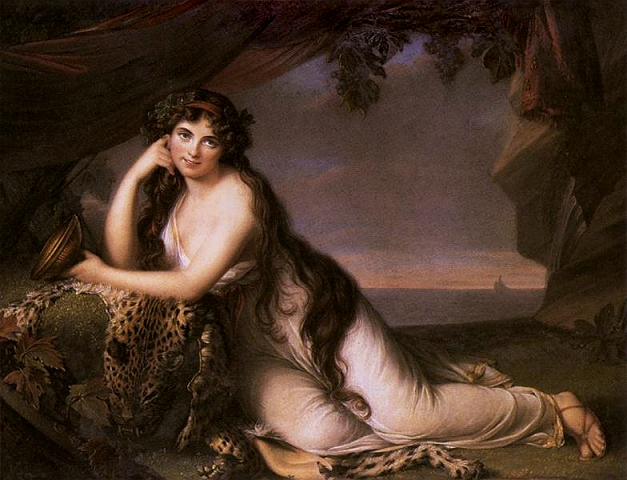
Lady Hamilton as Ariadne by Élisabeth Vigée-Lebrun, 1790

Over the next few years the relationship between Emma and Hamilton flourished. She did the honours at the Palazzo Sessa, entertaining large numbers of guests. She became fluent in Italian and, under the tutelage of a music master, developed her singing voice. She performed the Attitudes in front of selected guests. There were trips to Rome and the countryside and an expedition to Mount Vesuvius. There were afternoons at Hamilton's villa on the beach at Posillipo, which he renamed Villa Emma. In 1790, Hamilton commissioned several portraits of Emma from the French artist Élisabeth Vigée Le Brun.

== Marriage ==
By 1791, Hamilton had resolved to marry Emma. In a letter to a friend, Countess Spencer, he acknowledged that it might seem unwise for a man of sixty to marry a beautiful young woman with a dubious past, but said that, after living together for over five years, he was convinced of "her true repentance for the past". In April 1791, Hamilton, Emma and her mother set off for England, travelling overland via Venice and Brussels. They arrived in London in May and Emma sat for several portraits by Romney while Hamilton attended to business concerning his estates in Wales. They then went on a tour of England, visiting friends and relatives of Hamilton. Emma performed her attitudes and gave musical performances. They were married quietly on 6 September 1791 at St Marylebone Parish Church. Emma signed her name Amy Lyon in the register and the witnesses were Hamilton's kinsman, the Marquess of Abercorn, and Louis Dutens, who had held a diplomatic position in Turin. Later that morning, Emma sat for Romney for a portrait with the title The Ambassadress. Following the wedding, Greville transferred the cost of maintenance of Emma's daughter to Hamilton, sending him a bill for £32 and 11 shillings that was owed.

Two days after the wedding, the couple, accompanied by Mrs Cadogan, left England to return to Naples. The marriage was reported in newspapers, the Morning Herald writing that Emma, of "whose feminine graces and musical accomplishments all Europe resounds, was but a few years back the inferior housemaid of Mrs Linley". They spent a week in Paris, where Emma sang or performed her Attitudes for members of the British aristocracy. She was also presented to Marie Antoinette, who at that time was under house arrest in the Tuileries Palace and who gave her a letter to take to her sister, Maria Carolina, Queen of Naples.

== Naples 1791–1799 ==
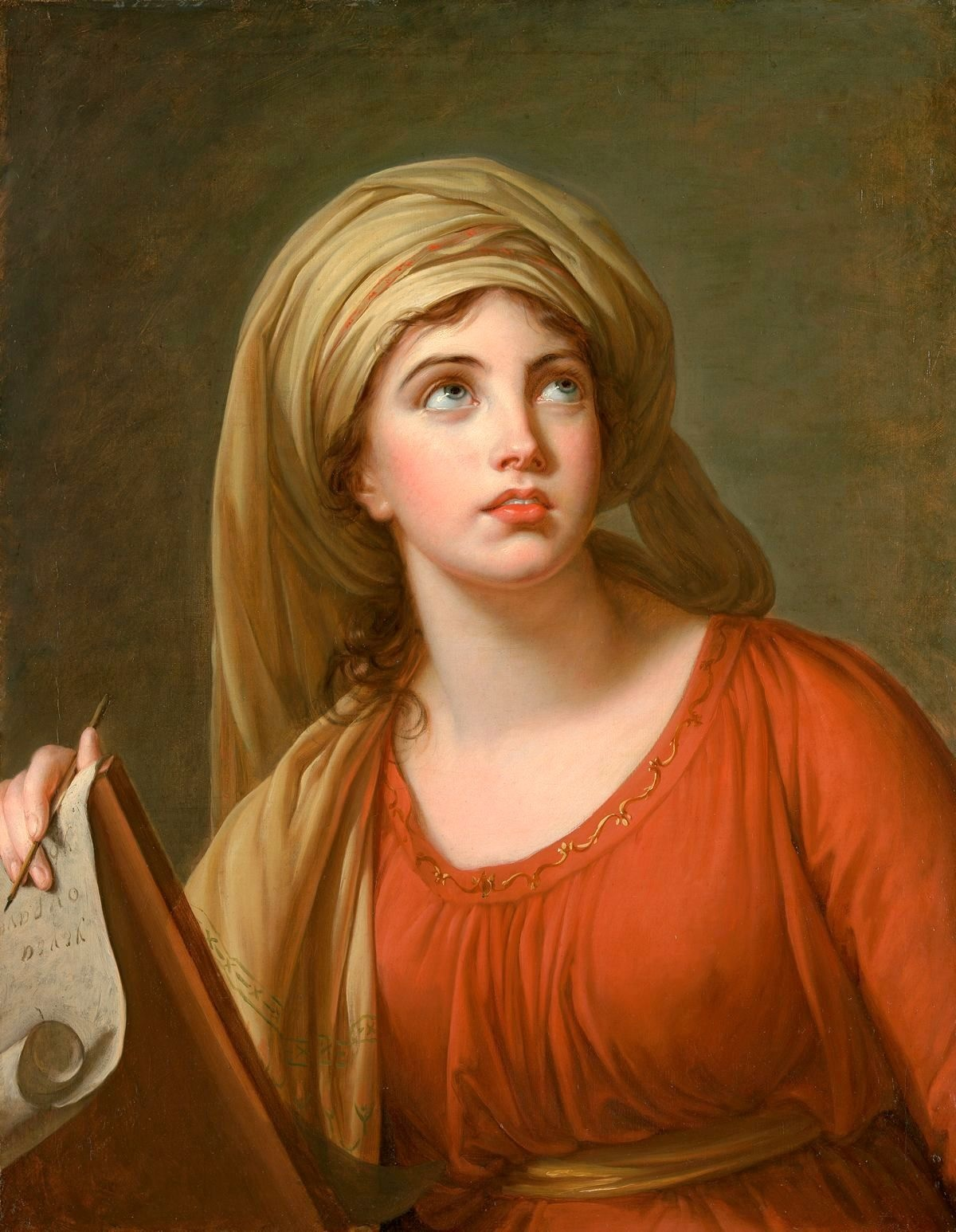
Lady Hamilton as the Persian Sibyl, 1792, by Élisabeth Vigée Le Brun

Emma returned to Naples in the autumn of 1791 as Lady Hamilton. Her newfound respectability as wife of the British envoy allowed her to be introduced to Queen Maria Carolina, with whom she developed a close friendship. She was also accepted by English visitors to Naples. After Lord and Lady Malmesbury had been entertained at Hamilton's house in Caserta on Boxing Day 1791, Lady Malmesbury wrote of Emma: "She really behaves as well as possible, and quite wonderfully considering her origin and education.... I believe all the English mean to be very civil to her, which is quite right". The Duchess of Devonshire, visiting Naples in 1793, wrote to her daughter that Emma was "ador'd here not only for her beauty & talents but for her Charity".

In February 1793, France declared war on Great Britain and the Dutch Republic and five months later the Kingdom of Naples signed an alliance with Britain, promising to provide 6,000 soldiers in return for receiving protection from a British fleet in the Mediterranean. Emma met Horatio Nelson for the first time on 11 September 1793, when he arrived in the Bay of Naples as captain of Agamemnon with dispatches from Lord Hood, commander of the Mediterranean Fleet, asking the kingdom to provide the promised soldiers in order to reinforce allied troops at Toulon.

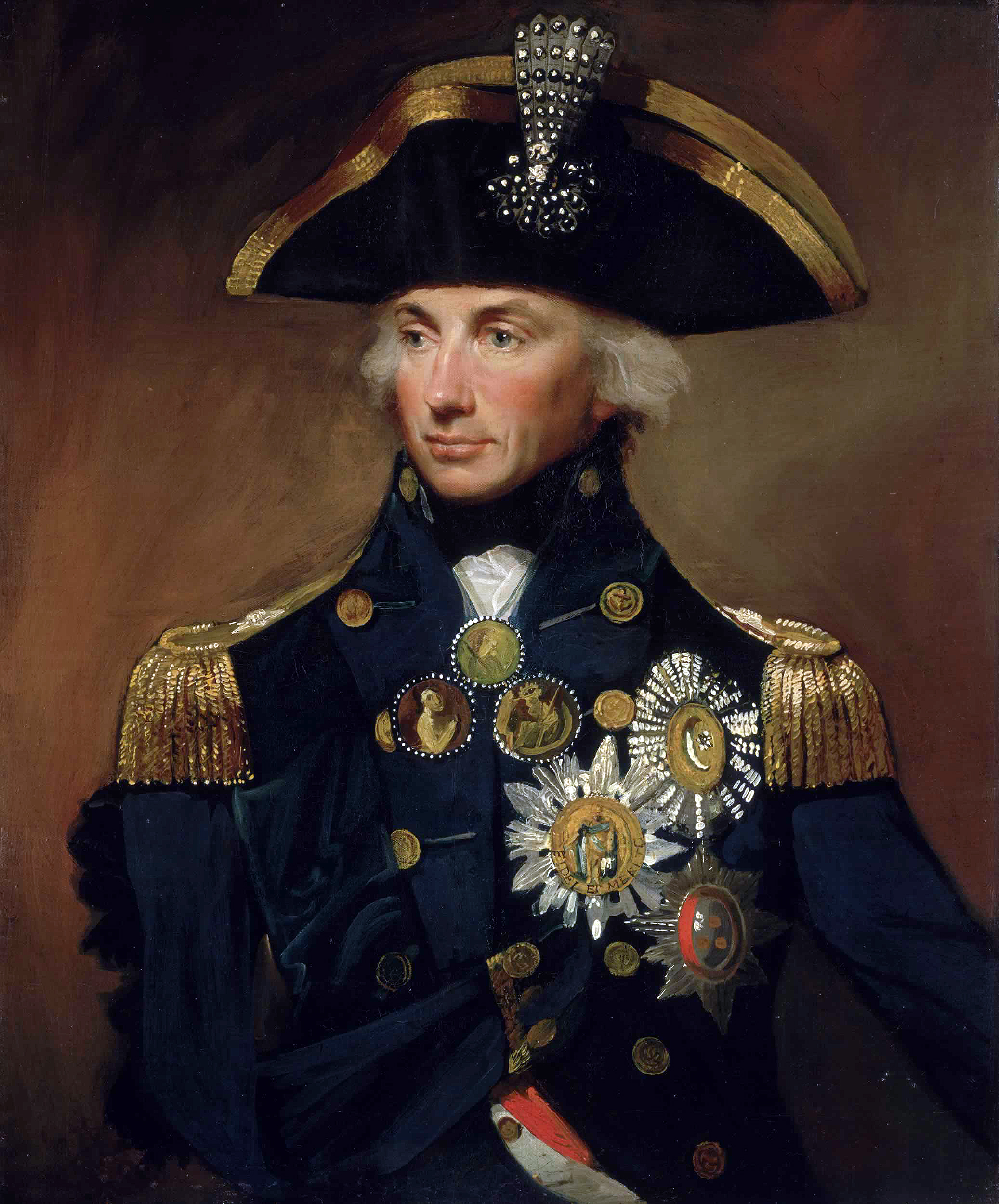
Horatio Nelson, 1799

Nelson returned to Naples five years later, on 22 September 1798, after his victory at the Battle of the Nile, which had destroyed the French fleet. He was welcomed as a hero. Since his last visit to Naples, he had lost his right arm and the sight in his right eye. He had also received a head wound in the Battle of the Nile and was generally not in good shape after six months at sea. Soon after his arrival, he collapsed and took to his bed at the Palazzo Sessa, where Emma nursed him. By his fortieth birthday, on 29 September, he had recovered enough to attend a ball for 1,800 guest given by Emma and Hamilton to celebrate the occasion. Nelson's stepson, midshipman Josiah Nisbet, had accompanied him to Naples and made a drunken scene at the ball, accusing Emma of being too affectionate with his mother's husband. Nelson wrote admiringly of Emma to his wife Fanny in England, saying that she was proof that "reputations may be regained".

On 29 November 1798, a Neapolitan army under the leadership of King Ferdinand marched into Rome, which had been evacuated by the invading French Army. On 7 December, the French regrouped and the Neapolitan forces retreated to Naples. The royal family made preparations to flee to Sicily, which was also part of their kingdom, as Naples came under threat from the French. On the night of 21 December, Emma, Hamilton and Mrs Cadogan joined the royal family and their entourage on Nelson's Vanguard. The ship sailed on 23 December and, after a stormy crossing, arrived in Palermo on 26 December. Emma acted as an interpreter and translator for Nelson, who spoke neither French nor Italian.

Following the flight of the royal family and invasion by the French Army, Liberals in Naples set up the revolutionary Parthenopean Republic. The lazzaroni, or common people of Naples, remained loyal to the king and made an unsuccessful attempt to defend the city against the French. The king sent a force under Cardinal Fabrizio Ruffo to put down the revolution. In June 1799 the Republicans surrendered and signed an armistice with Ruffo which allowed them safe passage to France. Nelson, accompanied by Emma and Hamilton, returned to Naples on the Foudroyant and refused to accept the terms of the treaty. Acting under instructions from the court in Palermo, Nelson disembarked the Revolutionaries from the ships they were waiting to sail on. Many of them were tried and executed. One of the leaders of the revolution, Admiral Francesco Caracciolo, was tried by royal officers on the Foudroyant and hanged from the yardarm, in spite of his plea to Emma to be shot rather than hanged. Emma had by then become not only a close personal friend of Maria Carolina, but had developed into an important political influence and acted as a go-between, conveying messages from the queen to Nelson and from Nelson to the queen. When the Foudroyant returned to Palermo in August, the Hamiltons left Naples for the last time. Nelson's role in the brutal repression of the revolution in Naples damaged his reputation in England, but Ferdinand and Maria Carolina expressed their gratitude by awarding him the Dukedom of Bronte. There were also gifts for Emma and Hamilton.

== London and Merton ==
Nelson's recall to Britain in early 1800 coincided with the government granting the request of Hamilton, who was in poor health, for relief from his post in Naples. By February 1800, Emma's relationship with Nelson had become a sexual one and she must have become pregnant around April 1800. Before returning to England, Nelson took Emma and Hamilton on a cruise to Malta. Emma was made a Dame of the Order of Malta in recognition for having sent several shiploads of corn to the island in December 1799. In the summer and autumn of 1800, Nelson, Emma, her mother, and Hamilton travelled together—taking a long route back to Britain via Trieste, Ljubljana, Graz, Vienna, Prague, Dresden, Magdeburg and Hamburg, where they embarked for England. As far as Vienna, they were accompanied by Maria Carolina and her entourage. Wherever they stopped, Nelson was welcomed by crowds, and banquets and receptions were held in his honour. Prince Esterházy invited Nelson, Emma and Hamilton to his palace at Eisenstadt, where Emma performed her Attitudes and sang songs composed by Esterházy's court musician, Joseph Haydn. They heard the Missa in Angustiis (now known as the Nelson Mass). They arrived in Yarmouth to a hero's welcome on 6 November 1800.

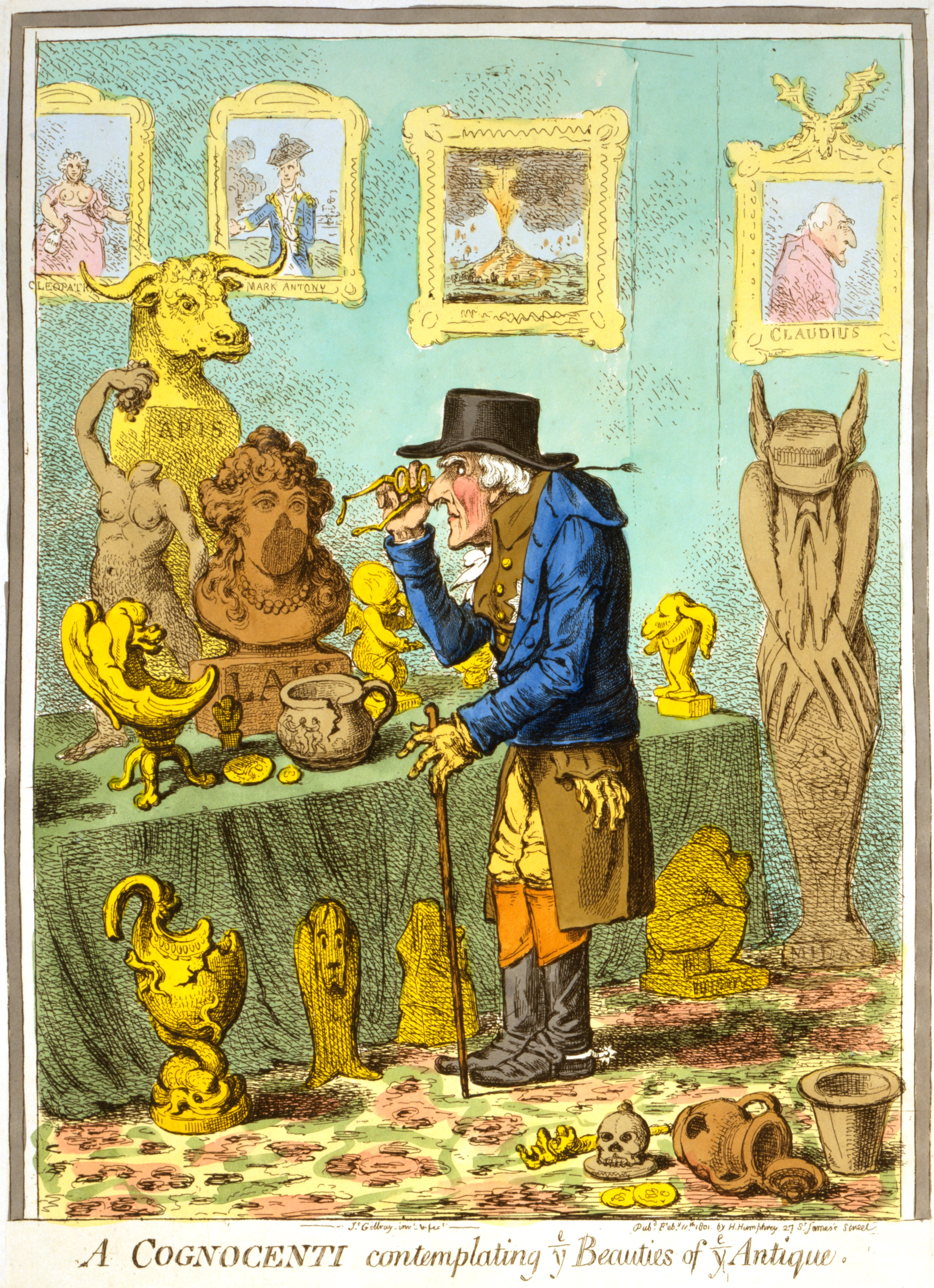
In A Cognocenti contemplating ye Beauties of ye Antique (1801)

Upon arrival in London on 8 November, Nelson, Emma and Hamilton took suites at Nerot's Hotel in St James's, while Mrs Cadogan found cheaper lodgings. In the evening they dined with Nelson's father and Nelson's wife, Fanny, who was meeting Emma for the first time. The Hamiltons moved into William Beckford's mansion at 22 Grosvenor Square until, in December, Hamilton rented a house at 23 Piccadilly, opposite Green Park. Nelson and Fanny took a furnished house at 17 Dover Street. Fanny Nelson was not as philosophical about her husband's affair with Emma as Hamilton was. By now, the affair was common knowledge and generated much newspaper coverage, including thinly-veiled allusions to Emma's pregnancy. Hamilton was lampooned as a cuckhold in the press, but his niece observed that he doted on Emma and that she was very attached to him. Satirical prints portraying Hamilton as a cuckold included A Cognocenti contemplating ye Beauties of ye Antique and Dido in despair by James Gillray.

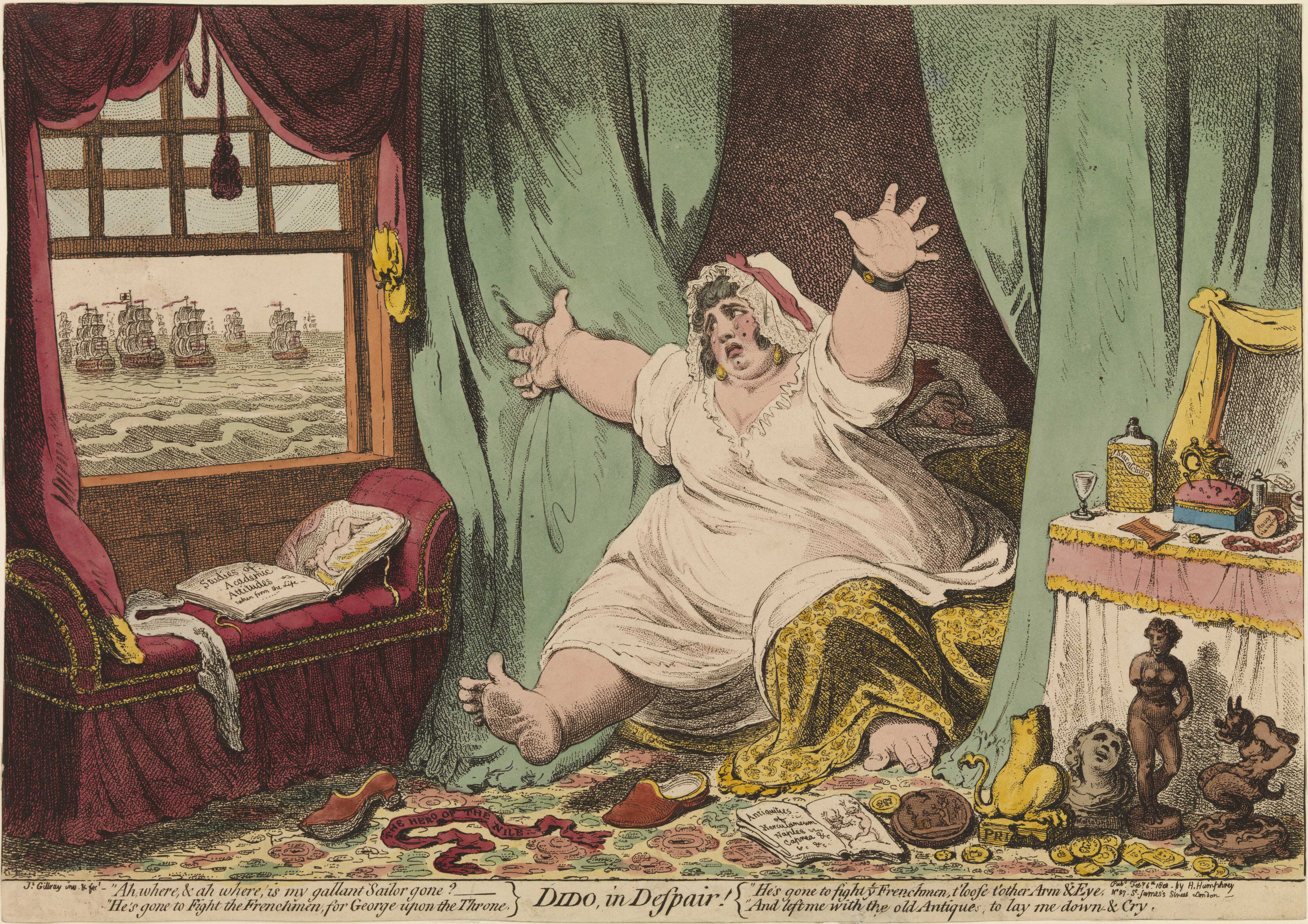
Dido in Despair (1801)

On 1 January, Nelson's promotion to vice admiral was confirmed and he prepared to go to sea. Faced with an ultimatum from his wife to give up either her or Emma, he decided to formalise a separation from Fanny.

=== Birth of Horatia ===
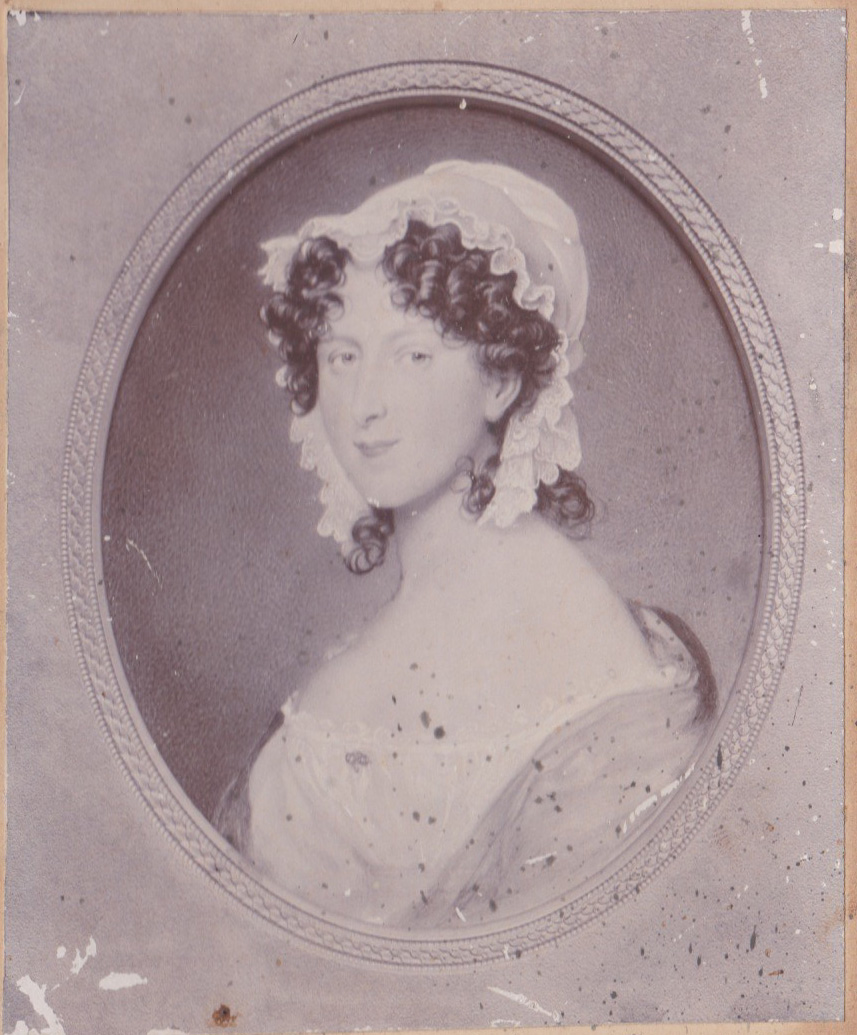
Horatia Ward née Nelson

On 29 January 1801, at 23 Piccadilly, Emma gave birth to Nelson's daughter Horatia, who was taken soon afterwards to a Mrs Gibson for care and hire of a wet nurse. On 1 February, Emma made a spectacular appearance at a concert at the house of the Duke of Norfolk in St James' Square.

In late February, Nelson returned to London and met his daughter at Mrs Gibson's. Nelson and Emma continued to write letters to each other when he was away at sea, all of which she kept. While he was away, she arranged for her mother to visit the Kidds in Hawarden and her daughter Emma Carew in Manchester. Emma kept her first daughter's existence a secret from Nelson, and Sir William continued to provide for her.

=== Merton Place ===
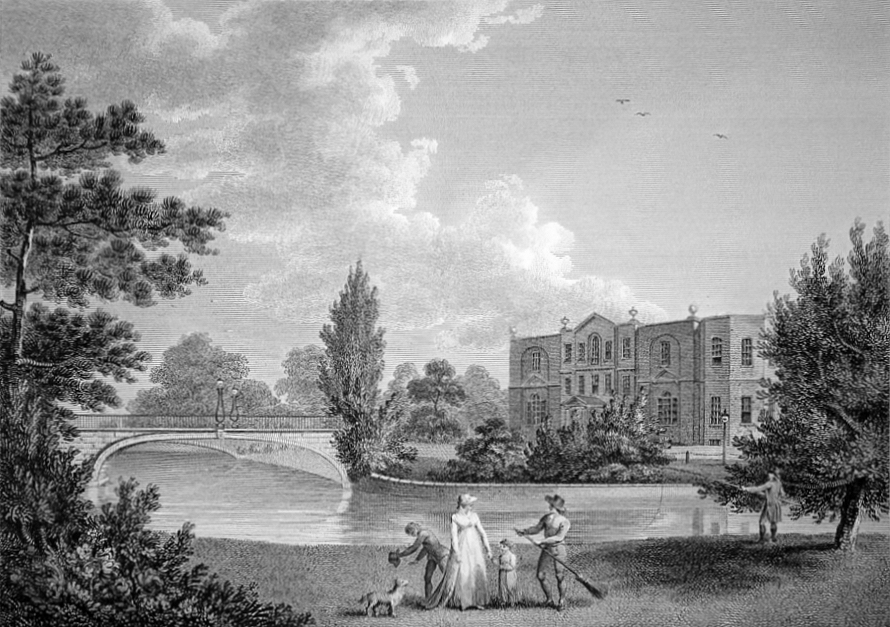
Merton Place

In September 1801, upon Emma's advice, Nelson bought Merton Place, a small ramshackle house at Merton, near Wimbledon, for £9,000, borrowing money from his friend and prize agent Alexander Davison. He gave her free rein with spending to improve the property and realise her vision to transform the house into a celebration of his genius. The gardens were landscaped, and the surrounding acres stocked with pigs and chickens. There they lived together openly, with Sir William and Emma's mother, in a ménage à trois that fascinated the public. Emma applied herself to winning over Nelson's family, nursing his 80-year-old father Edmund for ten days at Merton. She also made herself useful to Nelson's sisters Kitty (Catherine), married to George Matcham, and Susanna, married to Thomas Bolton, with gifts and with assistance with bringing up their daughters. Nelson's sister-in-law Sarah (married to William Nelson), also asked for favours, including the payment of her son Horatio's school fees at Eton. Around this time, Emma told Nelson about her daughter Emma Carew, and found that she had had nothing to worry about; he invited her to stay at Merton and soon grew fond of "Emma's relative". An unpublished letter shows that Nelson assumed responsibility for the upkeep of Emma Carew at this time.

After the Treaty of Amiens on 25 March 1802, Nelson was released from active service. He wanted to keep his new-found position in society by maintaining an aura of wealth, and Emma worked hard to satisfy his expectations. Nelson's father became seriously ill in April, but Nelson did not visit him in Norfolk, staying at Merton to celebrate Emma's 37th birthday on the day he died.

=== Death of Sir William Hamilton ===
In July 1802, Emma and Nelson accompanied Hamilton on a trip to Wales to inspect his estates, stopping at towns on the way for people to pay tribute to Nelson. On their return, Emma and Hamilton went sea bathing at Margate. In November 1802, Hamilton penned a letter to Emma, in which he gently reproached her for giving her whole attention to Nelson and for her extravagance. He expressed his wish to spend his remaining days quietly, following his favourite pursuits of fishing and attending museums and picture auctions, rather than entertaining at Merton. Referring to Nelson as a dear friend, he was willing, he said, to continue on the "present footing" but hinted at a separation if the "very silly altercations" between Emma and himself persisted. Hamilton had not been in good health for several years, and in February 1803 became seriously ill. He was nursed by Emma and her mother at Piccadilly and died on 6 April 1803. Emma wrote a note to herself: "Unhappy day for the forlorn Emma ten minutes past ten Dear Blessed Sir William left me".

Hamilton was buried, according to his wishes, beside his first wife at Slebech in Wales. Greville was executor of the will and inherited the estates in Wales. Emma was left an annuity of £800 and her debts were to be paid. The will referred to Nelson as "my dearest friend... the most virtuous, loyal and truly brave man I ever met with" and bequeathed him two sporting guns and a miniature of Emma. Emma moved out of the Piccadilly house and, for the sake of respectability having to have an address separate from Nelson's at Merton, took a house in Clarges Street.

=== Nelson at sea ===
On 6 May 1803, Nelson was recalled to sea to take up the command of the Mediterranean Fleet after France and Spain declared war on England. Before leaving, he arranged for Horatia to be baptised at Marylebone Parish Church, where Emma had been married. Mrs Gibson was instructed to pay the clergyman and clerk double fees to omit the name of the parents in the register, so that Nelson and Emma could maintain the fiction that Horatia was their godchild. Emma organised the wedding of Nelson's niece Kitty Bolton (daughter of Nelson's sister Susanna) and her cousin Captain Sir William Bolton. Nelson left for Portsmouth on 18 May, leaving Emma unaware that she was pregnant with their second child. While Nelson was as sea, he and Emma wrote to each other frequently. Nelson destroyed Emma's letters, but Emma kept those of Nelson. Emma attempted to dispel her feelings of loneliness by entertaining at Clarges Street and overseeing the education of Nelson's niece Charlotte Nelson at Merton. The baby, a girl, was born at the end of 1803 but only lived a few weeks.

Emma saw Nelson's wife, Fanny, as an impediment to her own happiness as she could not marry Nelson while Fanny lived. In the autumn of 1804 she wrote to Nelson's prize agent, Alexander Davison, making no attempt to conceal her hostile feelings towards Fanny Nelson: "What a sad thing it is to think such a man as him should be entrapped with such an infamous woman as that apothecary's widow.... Whilst I am free – with talents he likes, adoring him, that never a woman adored a man as I do my Nelson, loving him beyond this world, and yet we are both miserable... patience."

In August 1805, Nelson was able to pay a brief visit to Merton, where he found Emma, four-year-old Horatia and a stream of visitors. On 2 September Nelson was informed that the French fleet had been sighted off Cádiz and that he was offered the command of the British fleet. He had an opportunity to say goodbye to Emma and Horatia on 13 September, before setting sail on HMS Victory.

=== Death of Nelson ===
On 21 October 1805, Nelson's fleet defeated a joint Franco-Spanish naval force at the Battle of Trafalgar. Nelson was seriously wounded during the battle and died three hours later. That morning, before the battle, he had written a note intended as a codicil to his will requesting that, in return for his legacy to King and Country that they should give Emma "ample provision to maintain her rank in life", and that his "adopted daughter, Horatia Nelson Thompson... use in future the name of Nelson only".

When the news of Nelson's death arrived in London, a messenger, Captain Whitby from the Admiralty was sent to Merton Place to bring the news to Lady Hamilton. She later recalled:

He came in, and with a pale countenance and faint voice, said, 'We have gained a great Victory.' – 'Never mind your Victory,' I said. 'My letters – give me my letters' – Capt. Whitby was unable to speak – tears in his eyes and a deathly paleness over his face made me comprehend him. I believe I gave a scream and fell back, and for ten hours I could neither speak nor shed a tear...

Emma lay in bed prostrate with grief for three weeks, receiving visitors in tears. At Merton, she was supported by Nelson's sister, Kitty Matcham, and her husband. Nelson's will was read in November. Emma was left Merton Place, £2,000, and a £500 a year from the Bronte estate in Italy, which was inherited by Nelson's brother William, who also inherited the rest of Nelson's estates and possessions. Nelson was given a lavish state funeral in St Paul's Cathedral, to which Emma was not invited.

The government awarded Nelson's brother William the title of Earl Nelson and £100,000 with which to buy an estate. Nelson's sisters were each given £10,000. The prime minister, Lord Grenville was unsympathetic towards Emma and declined to honour the codicil of Nelson's will, in which he had asked the government to provide for her and Horatia. Emma's attempts to obtain a pension in recognition for her diplomatic services in Naples were also unsuccessful.

== Later years and death ==
Emma's later years were marred by increasing debt. Her husband and Nelson had provided her with enough to live comfortably, but she was unable to curb her spending. She continued to entertain extravagantly, give money to relatives, and spend money on Merton to create a monument to Nelson. In 1806, she took in an impoverished journalist, James Harrison, and his family while he wrote a two-volume Life of Nelson, which made it clear that Horatia was his child, while describing Emma as her guardian rather than her mother.

Emma moved from Clarges Street to a cheaper home at 136 Bond Street, but could not at first bring herself to relinquish Merton. She continued with a busy round of dinners and parties in London, on occasion performing her Attitudes, and entertained at Merton, with guests including the Prince of Wales and his brothers, the Duke of Sussex and the Duke of Clarence, but no favours were returned by the royals. It was an unsustainable lifestyle and, by 1808, Emma was more than £15,000 in debt. Her Merton neighbour, Abraham Goldsmid organised a committee of financiers, including Sir John Perring, to sell Merton – finally purchased by Goldsmid's brother in 1809 – and clear her debts with the help of a gift of £2,500 from the Duke of Queensberry.

Emma's mother, Mrs Cadogan, died in January 1810 and was buried at the church on Paddington Green, where she had once lived with Emma and Greville. Emma accumulated more debts, and by 1813 had been committed, or had committed herself, to the King's Bench Debtors' Prison in Southwark, where she was allowed to live with Horatia in lodgings "within the Rules", a three-square-mile area around the prison. She was still able to entertain; on Christmas Day 1813, the Duke of Sussex, the singer Elizabeth Billington and William Dillon dined with Emma on a turkey sent by Nelson's relatives. In 1814, while recovering from an attack of jaundice, she was alerted to the publication of a volume of Letters of Lord Nelson to Lady Hamilton. She denied having sold the letters, which she said must be forgeries or have been stolen, but not everyone believed her and her reputation suffered. Amongst her remaining friends was Alderman Joshua Smith, former Lord Mayor of London, who obtained part of her Bronte pension from Earl Nelson so that she could pay off her most pressing creditors and escape the others by going to France. On 2 July 1814, Emma and Horatia boarded a small boat on the River Thames and sailed for Calais.

Initially taking apartments at the expensive Dessein's Hotel, she was joined by her Merton housekeeper, Dame Francis. Horatia attended a school run by an English woman, and Emma joined the congregation of the Catholic Church of St Pierre. After spending some time in a farmhouse outside Calais, they moved to cheaper accommodation at 27 Rue Française. By this time, Emma was very ill, probably from liver disease. She died on 15 January 1815.

Emma was buried in Calais after a funeral costing £28 arranged by Henry Cadogan, a Lloyd's agent in Calais, who was later reimbursed by Alderman Joshua Smith. Henry Cadogan took care of Horatia and arranged for her to return to England, where she lived with Nelson's relatives. Emma's grave was lost during rebuilding work in Calais. In 1994, the 1805 Club erected a memorial in Parc Richelieu near the site of Emma's original burial.

== Honours and heraldry ==
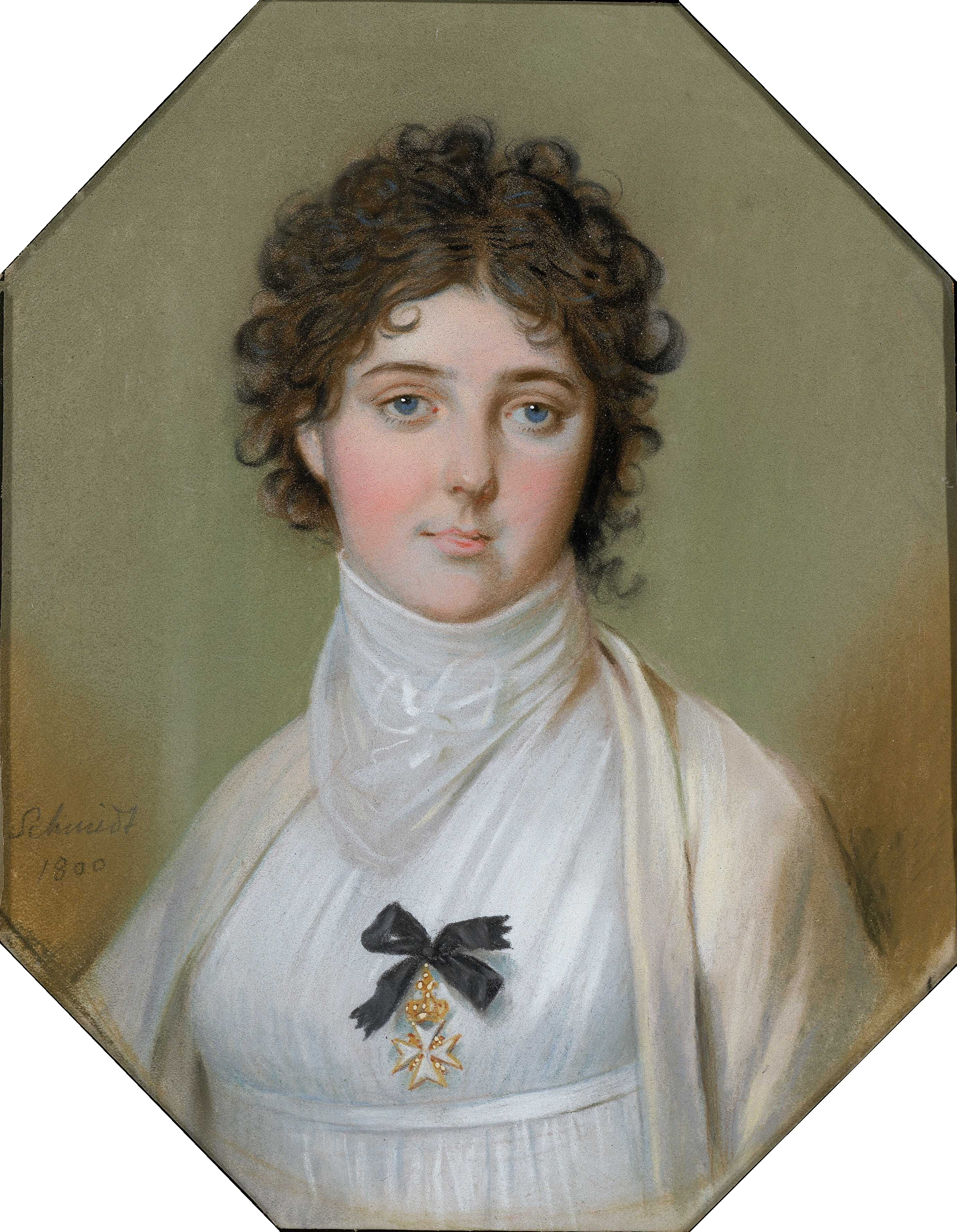
Portrait with Maltese Cross by Johann Heinrich Schmidt, c. 1800

Emma Hamilton is generally known by the courtesy title of Lady Hamilton, to which she was entitled from 1791 as the wife and then widow of Sir William Hamilton. In 1800, she became a member of the Order of Malta. This was an unusual honour, awarded to Lady Hamilton by the then Grand Master of the Order, Paul I of Russia, in recognition of her role in the defence of the island of Malta against the French.

Subsequently, she used her new title in formal circumstances. Under this title, she was granted her own coat of arms by the English College of Arms in 1806, Per pale Or and Argent, three Lions rampant Gules, on a chief Sable, a Cross of eight points of the second. The lions evidently refer to her maiden surname of Lyons; the addition of the Maltese Cross puzzled heraldic scholars unaware of her connection to the Order.

== In popular culture ==
- The 1919 silent British film The Romance of Lady Hamilton directed by Bert Haldane and starring Malvina Longfellow as Hamilton and Humberston Wright as Nelson.
- The 1921 silent German film Lady Hamilton directed by Richard Oswald with Liane Haid as Hamilton and Conrad Veidt as Nelson.
- The 1926 operetta Lady Hamilton by the German composer Eduard Künneke. The operetta was revived in Cologne in 2004.
- The 1929 Vitaphone part-silent film The Divine Lady. Corinne Griffith played Lady Hamilton and Victor Varconi played Admiral Nelson.
- The 1941 film That Hamilton Woman starring Vivien Leigh as Emma and Laurence Olivier as Horatio.
- The 1951 opera Nelson by Lennox Berkeley.
- The 1953 Soviet film Attack from the Sea. Emma Hamilton was portrayed by Yelena Kuzmina.
- The 1968 film Emma Hamilton. Emma Hamilton was portrayed by Michèle Mercier.
- The 1973 film Bequest to the Nation (released in the United States as The Nelson Affair). Emma Hamilton was portrayed by Glenda Jackson, and Peter Finch plays Nelson.
- Susan Sontag's 1992 novel The Volcano Lover: A Romance is a fictionalised portrait of Lady Emma and the times in which she lived.

== Biographies ==
- Jeaffreson, John Cordy (1888). Lady Hamilton and Lord Nelson. London: Hurst and Blackett, Limited.
- Sichel, Walter (1905). Emma Lady Hamilton. London: Archibald Constable and Company Ltd.
- Warner, Oliver (1960). Emma Hamilton and Sir William. London: Chatto & Windus.
- Tours, Hugh (1963). The Life and Letters of Emma Hamilton. London: Victor Gollancz Ltd.
- Russell, Jack (1972). Nelson and the Hamiltons. New York: Penguin. ISBN 067120324X.
- Hardwick, Mollie (1969). Emma, Lady Hamilton: A Study. London: Cassell.
- Lofts, Norah (1978). Emma Hamilton. New York: Coward, McCann & Geoghegan. ISBN 978-0-698-10912-4.
- Fraser, Flora (1986). Beloved Emma: The Life of Emma, Lady Hamilton. London: Weidenfeld & Nicolson. ISBN 978-0-297-78895-9.
- Hudson, Roger (1994). Nelson and Emma. London: Folio Society.
- Williams, Kate (2006). England's Mistress: The Infamous Life of Emma Hamilton. London: Hutchinson. ISBN 978-0-09-179474-3.
- Contogouris, Ersy (2018). Emma Hamilton and Late Eighteenth-Century European Art: Agency, Performance, and Representation. London and New York: Routledge. ISBN 9780815374237.
- Colville, Quintin; Williams, Kate (2016). Emma Hamilton Seduction and Celebrity. London: Thames & Hudson. ISBN 9780500252208.

== Gallery ==
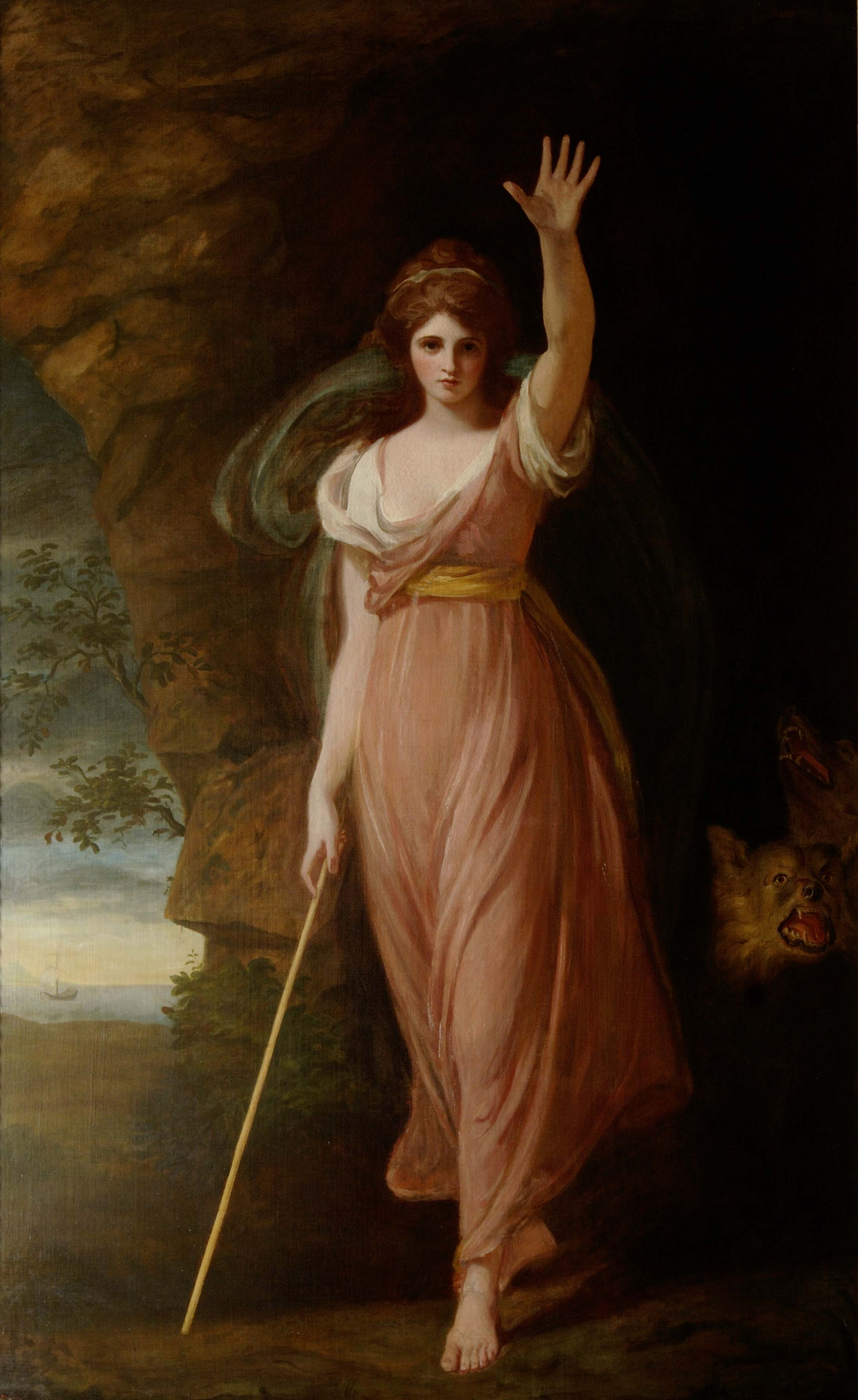
Emma as Circe, by George Romney, 1782.

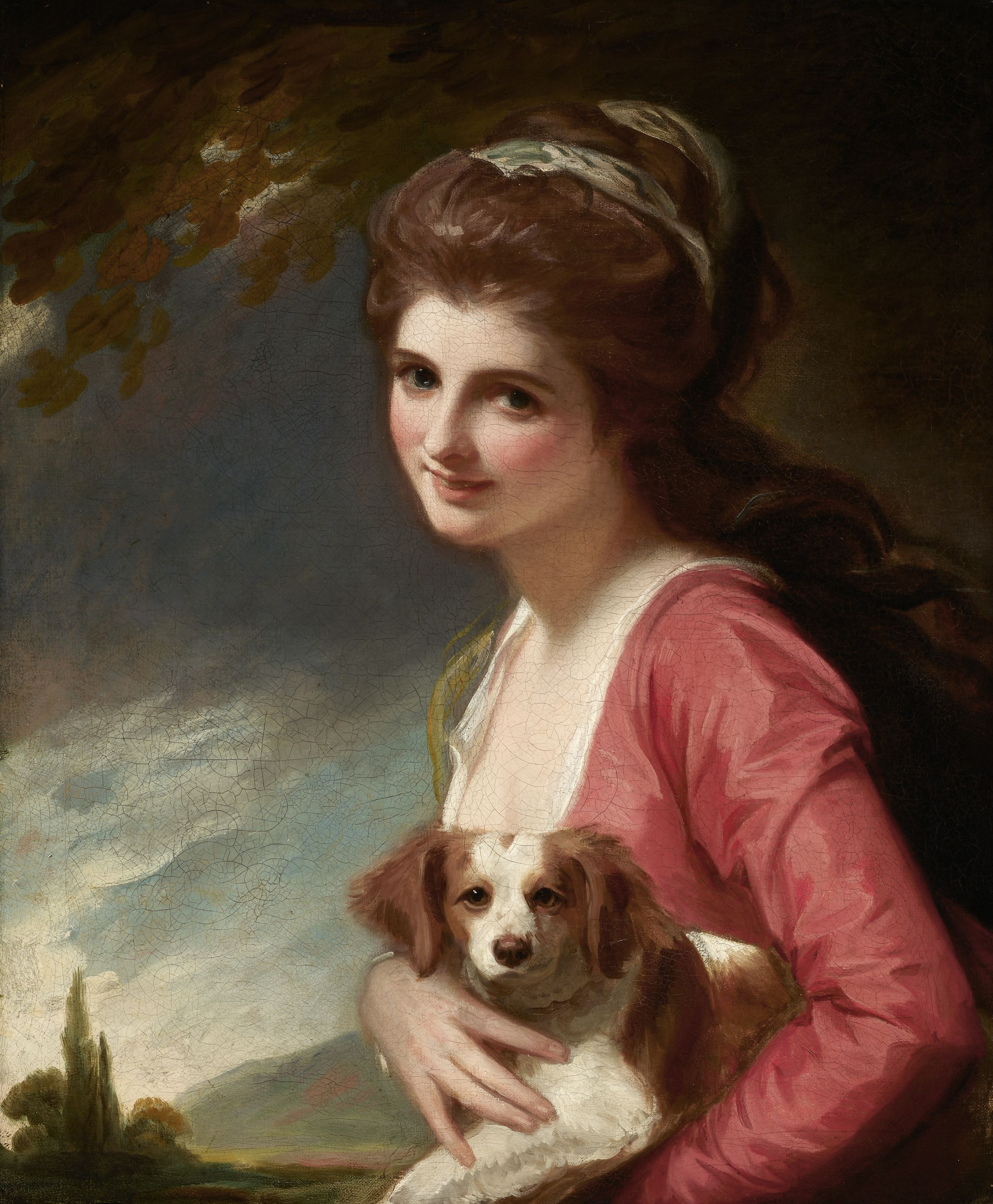
Lady Hamilton (as Nature) c.1782

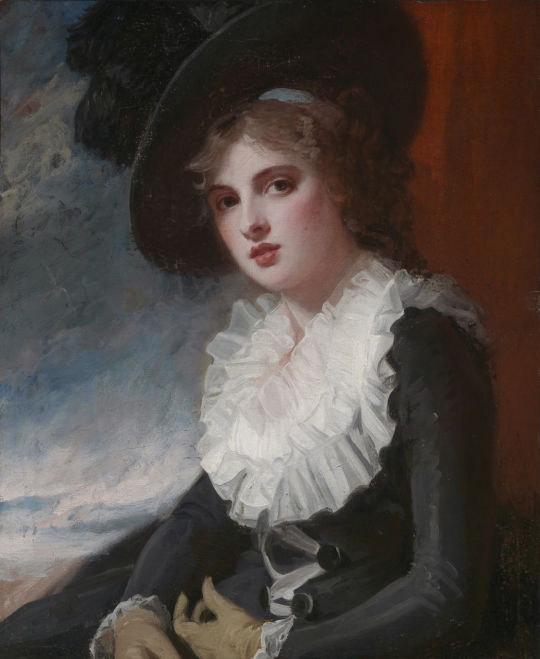
Emma by George Romney, c.1784

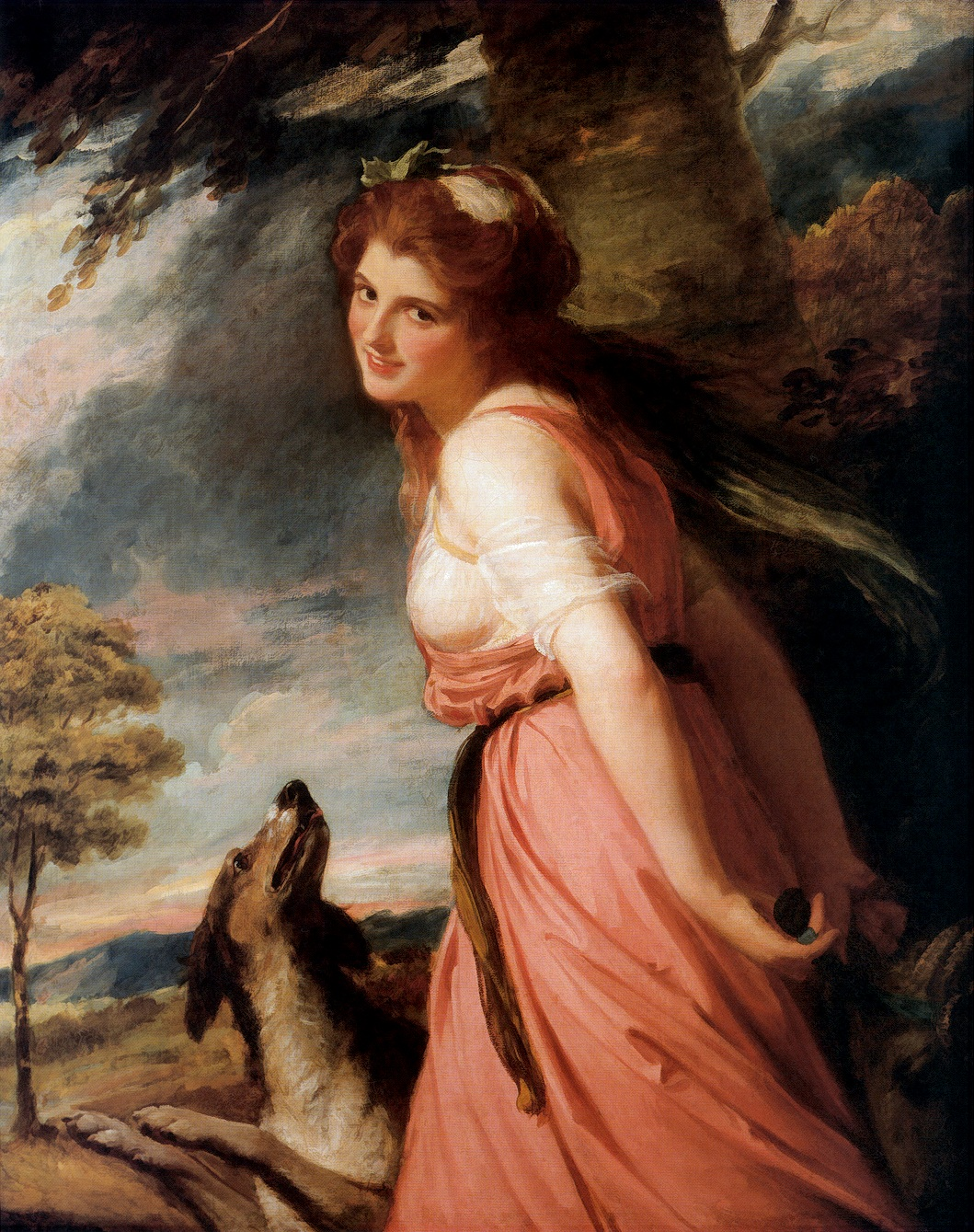
Emma as a Bacchante, by George Romney, 1785

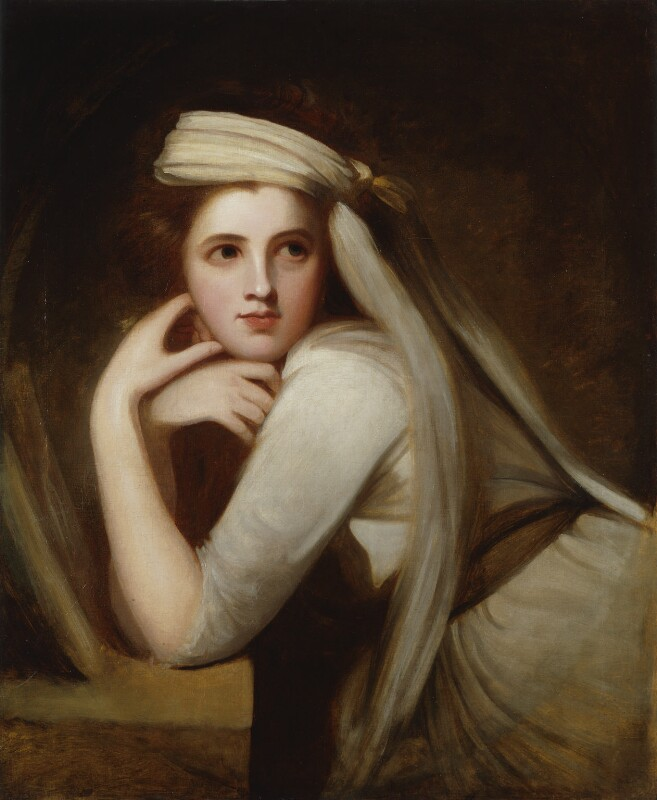
Emma as a Sibyl, by George Romney, c. 1785

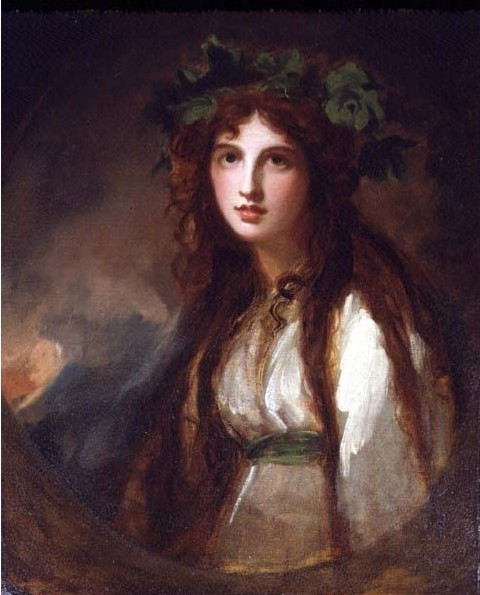
Emma as a Bacchante, by George Romney

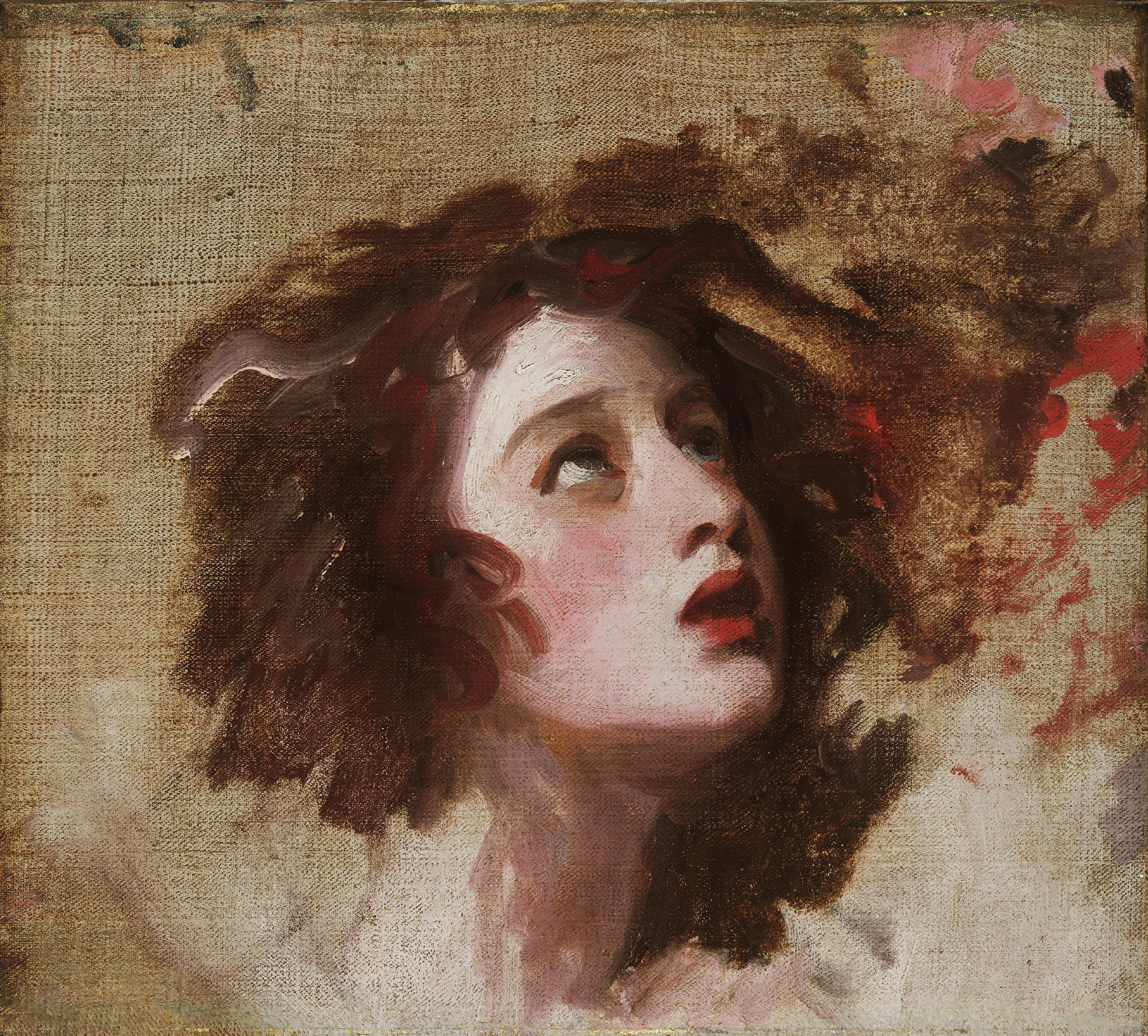
Emma as Miranda, by George Romney

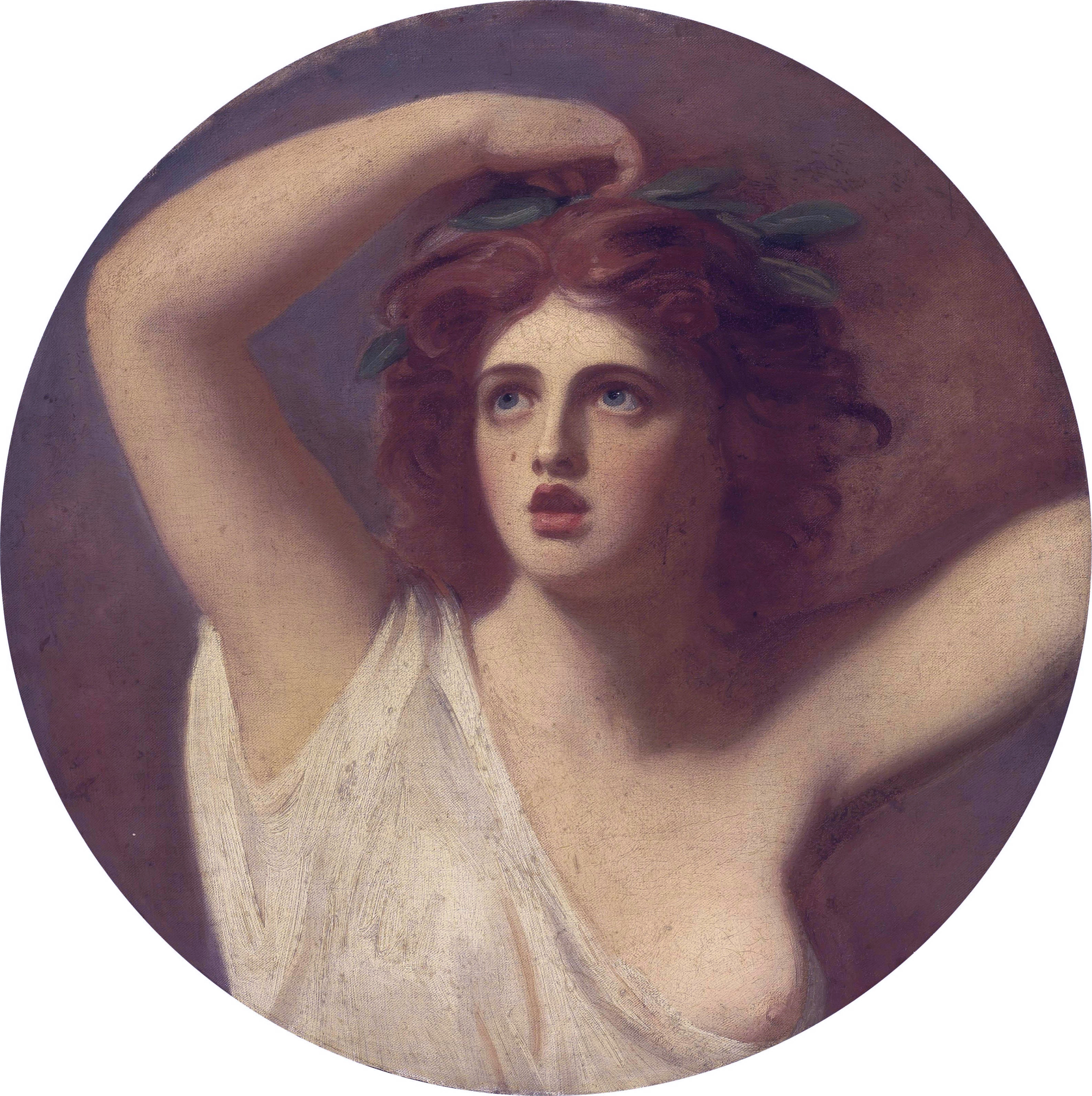
Lady Emma Hamilton, as Cassandra, by George Romney

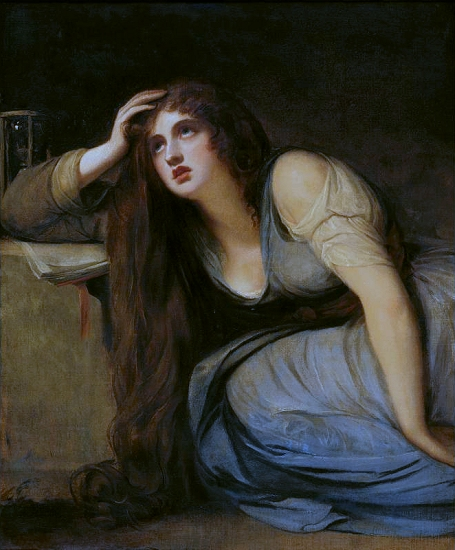
Lady Hamilton as The Magdalene, by George Romney, before 1792

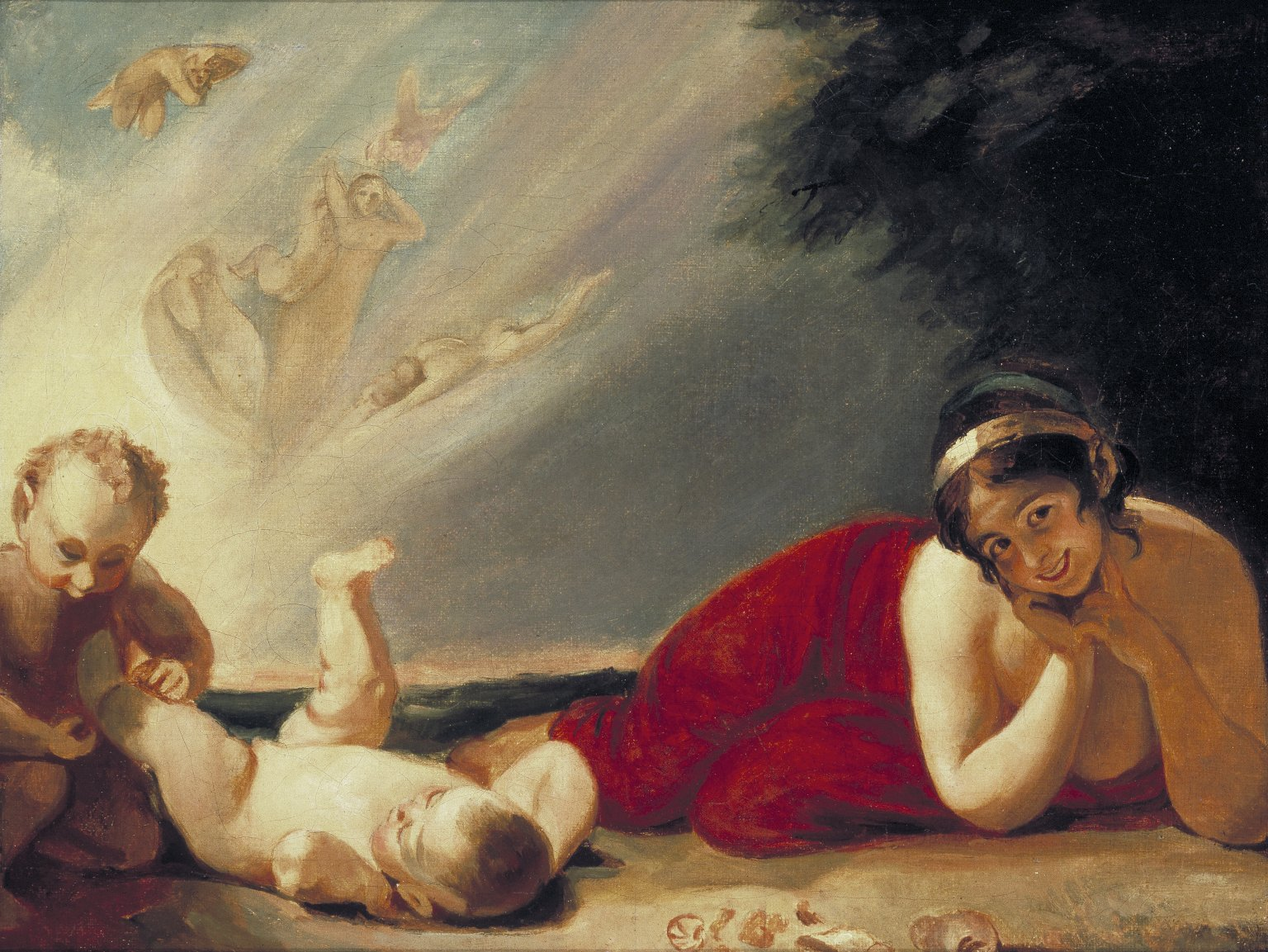
Lady Hamilton as Titania with Puck and Changeling, by George Romney, 1793

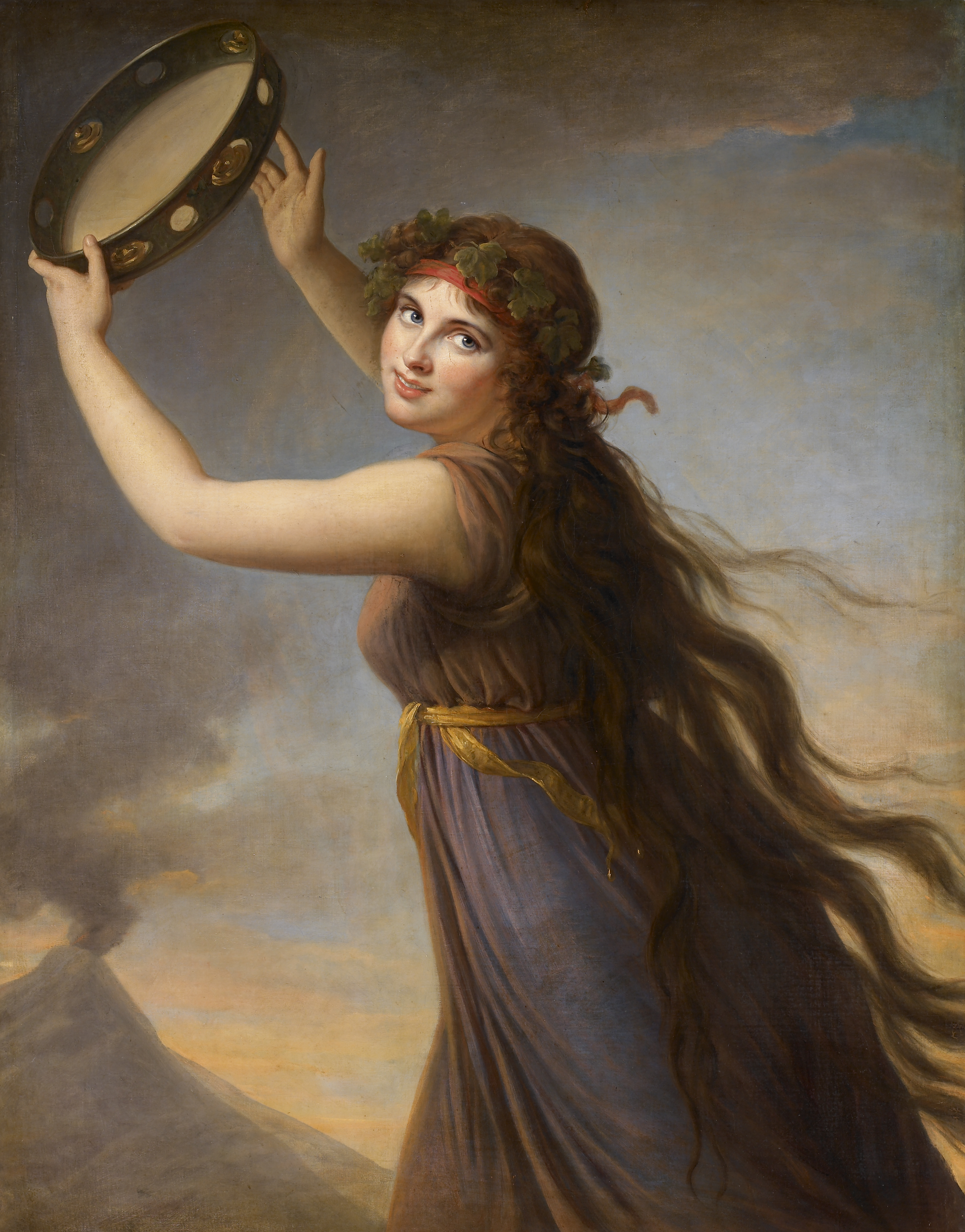
Lady Hamilton as a Bacchante, by Élisabeth Vigée-Lebrun, 1790–1791

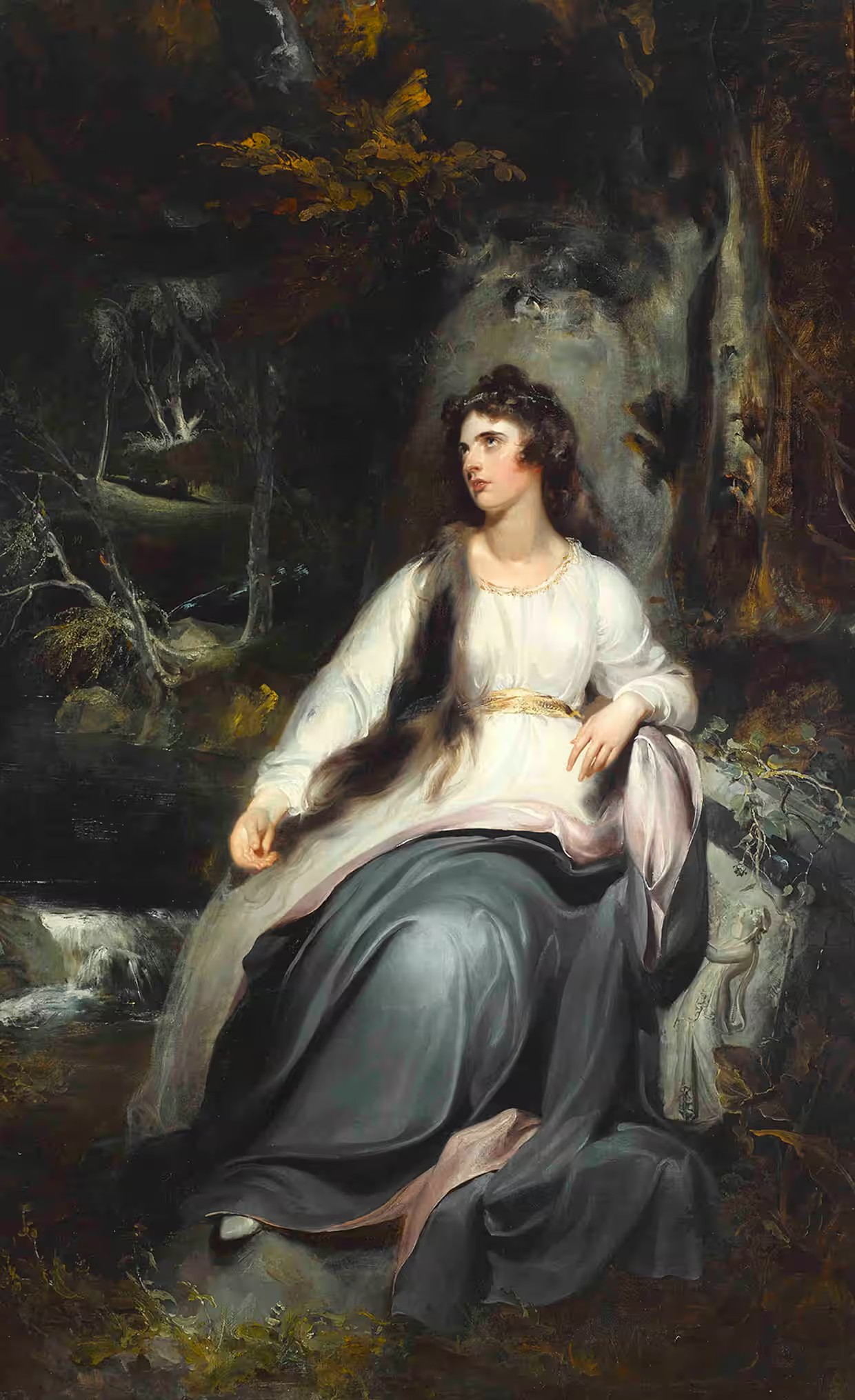
Lady Hamilton as La Penserosa by Thomas Lawrence, 1792
