= Uppark =

Grade I listed historic house museum in Chichester, UK, ca 1690

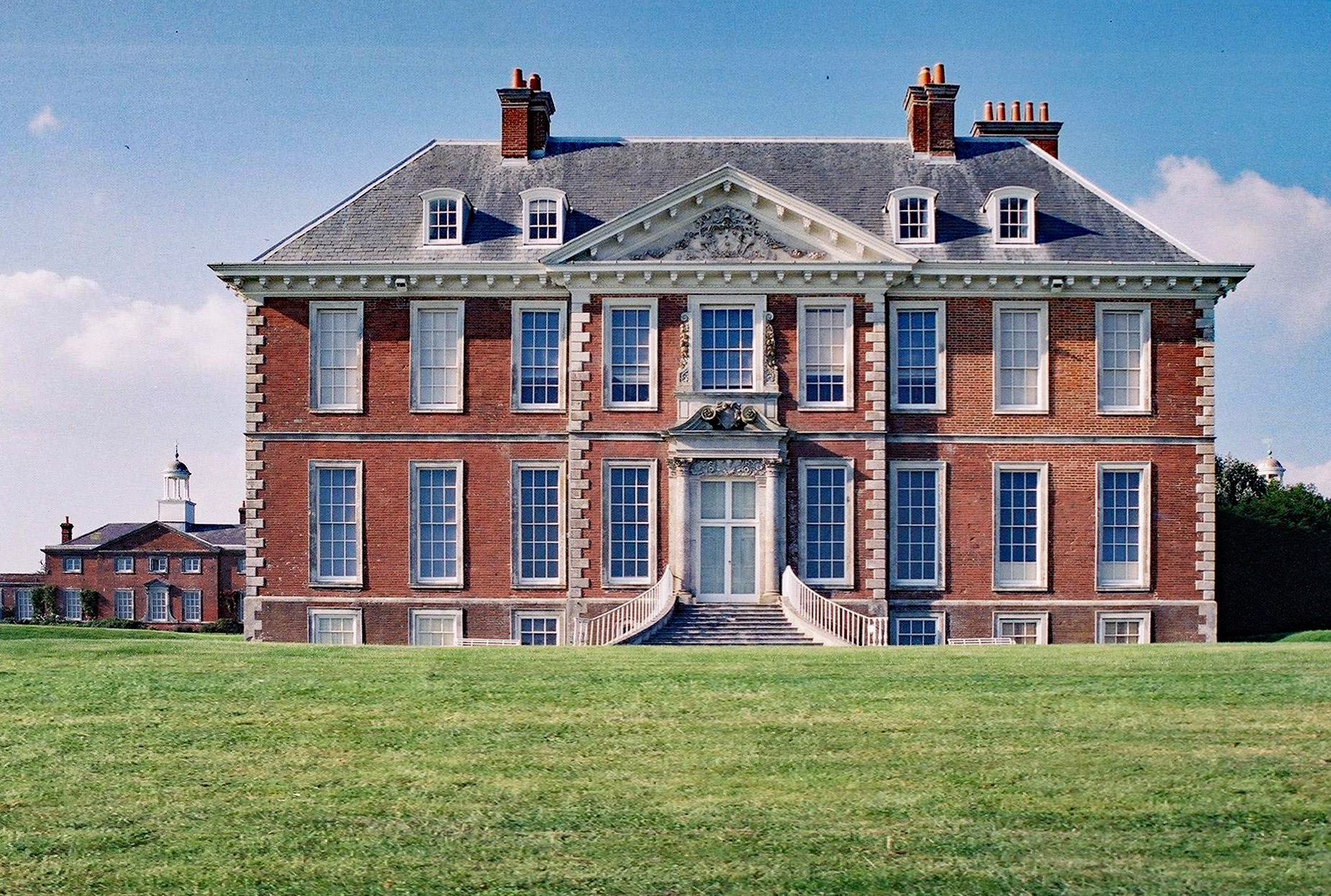
- The south front of the house

- Location within West Sussex
- 50°57′11″N 0°53′30″W
- Type: Country house
- Location: South Harting
- OS grid reference: SU 77981 17583

History
- Built: ca 1690

Site notes
- Area: West Sussex
- Architect(s): William Talman, Humphry Repton
- Architectural style: William & Mary
- Owner: National Trust

Listed Building – Grade I
- Official name: Uppark (National Trust)
- Designated: 18 Jun 1959
- Reference no.: 1025979

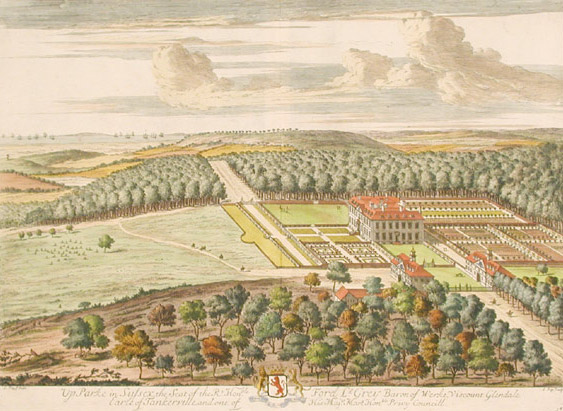
A bird's-eye view of Uppark in the early 18th century by Jan Kip.

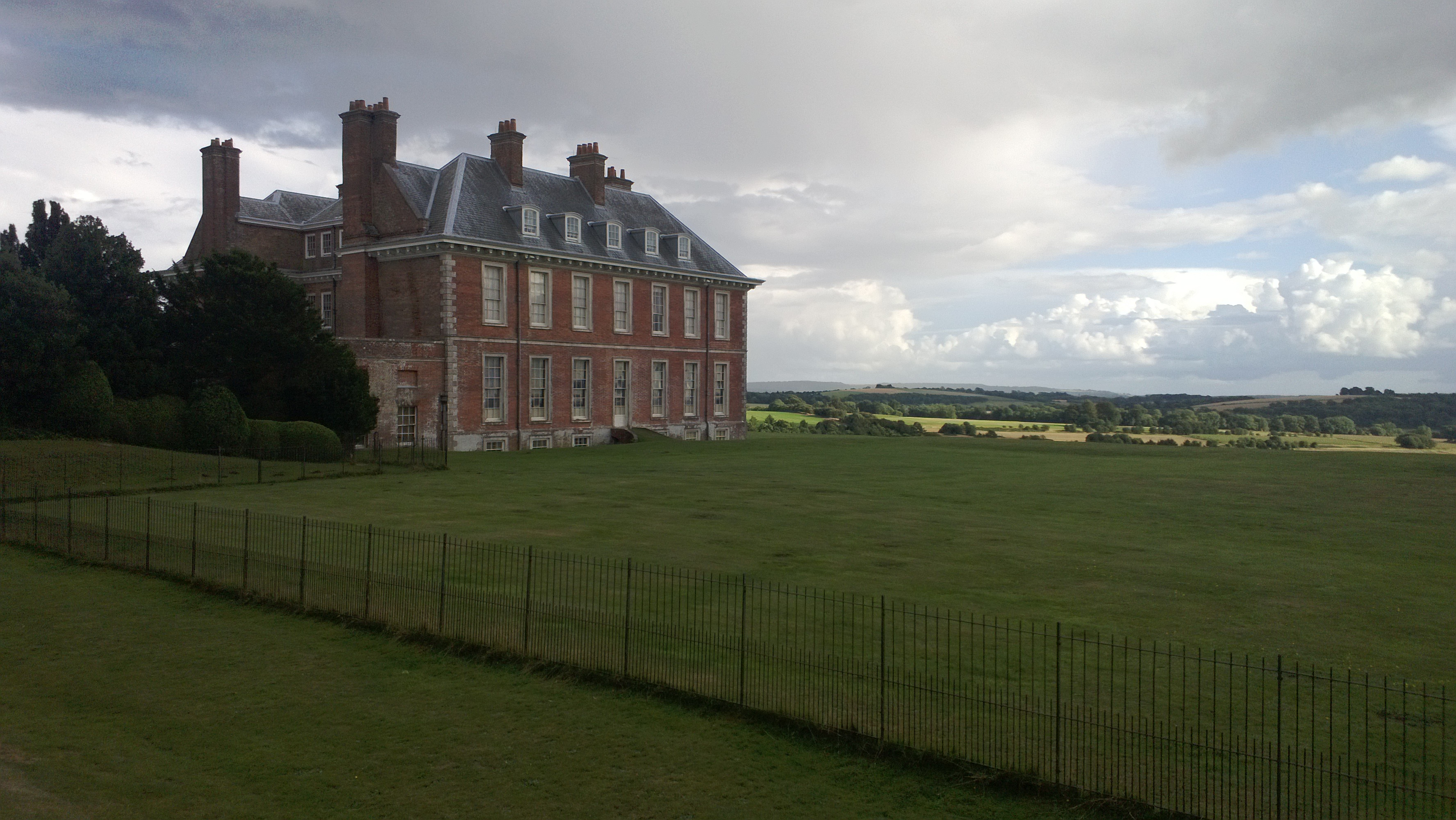
Uppark, side view

Uppark is a 17th-century house in South Harting, West Sussex, England. Formerly known as Up Park, to distinguish it from nearby Down Park, it is a Grade I listed building and a National Trust property.

== History ==
The house, set high on the South Downs, was built for Ford Grey, 1st Earl of Tankerville (1655—1701), circa 1690; the architect is believed to have been William Talman. The estate was sold in 1747 to Sir Matthew Fetherstonhaugh, and his wife Sarah. Matthew and Sarah redecorated the house extensively from 1750 to 1760 and introduced most of the existing collection of household items displayed today, much of it collected on their Grand Tour of 1749 to 1751.

Their only son, Sir Henry Fetherstonhaugh, took the teenaged Emma Hamilton as a mistress to live with him at Uppark in 1780 and to entertain his guests at the many parties he hosted, but rejected her when she became pregnant with his child in 1781. He added to the collection and commissioned Humphry Repton to add a new pillared portico, dairy and landscaped garden. In the 19th century stables and kitchens were added as separate buildings, connected to the main building by tunnels for servants' use. Sir Harry married, at the age of 71, the estate's dairymaid, 21-year-old Mary Ann Bullock, to whom he left Uppark on his death in 1846. She in turn, after considerably upgrading the property, left it to her sister Frances on her own death in 1874. Frances Bullock, under her adopted name of Miss Fetherstonhaugh, was determined to fulfill the trust her sister had passed on. She chose her two friends, Colonel Keith Turnour and Admiral Herbert Meade, to be her heirs in succession. Both were selected as second sons who could, therefore, adopt her name, which both went on to do.

Admiral Meade's wife, Margaret, became the next mistress of Uppark in 1931. She continued caring for the house and contents as the Bullock sisters had done. After World War II, Admiral Meade-Fetherstonhaugh and his son, Richard, entered into negotiations with the National Trust, the outcome being that Uppark passed to the Trust in 1954. The house is open to the public, except for private apartments leased from the Trust that are still used as a home.

=== Influence on H. G. Wells ===
The 20 year-old H. G. Wells spent the winter of 1887/88 convalescing at Uppark, where his mother, Sarah, was housekeeper between 1880 and 1893. She had previously been employed there between 1850 and 1855, as housemaid to Lady Fetherstonhaugh's sister, and Wells had paid many visits to her during his boyhood. Wells' father Joseph, a gardener, was employed at Uppark in 1851 and he and Sarah married in 1853.

The house and the social hierarchy it embodied had an important effect on Wells' outlook. The deep class divisions he observed there helped to inspire many of his meritocratic, liberal and socialist views. This development was further encouraged by his discovery, in Uppark's large library, of works by philosophers and radicals such as Plato, Voltaire and Thomas Paine. These impressions were reflected in his later work: for example, the contrast between the sunny and carefree world of the Eloi and the dark caves of the Morlocks in The Time Machine is commonly regarded to have been inspired by the inequalities Wells observed at Uppark. Also significant was Wells' discovery of a telescope in the house's attic, which gave the future author of The War of the Worlds his first opportunity to examine the night sky in detail.

=== Fire ===
On 30 August 1989 the building was devastated by a fire caused by a workman's blowtorch whilst repairing lead flashing on the roof, just two days before the work was due to be completed. The fire broke out during opening hours. Many works of art and pieces of furniture were carried out of the burning building by members of the Meade-Fetherstonehaugh family, National Trust staff and members of the public. Although the garret and first floors collapsed onto the lower floors and the garret and first-floor contents were lost completely, the floors largely fell clear of the ground-floor walls and much of the panelling and decoration survived.

Much of the contents of the ground floor were crushed but not burned; metalwork was able to be straightened and cleaned, crystal chandeliers were able to be reassembled, and even the elaborate tassels on the chandelier ropes were able to be conserved. The decision to restore the house came after it was determined that restoration would be a cheaper insurance settlement than complete payout for a total loss.

Most of the pictures and furniture in the house were saved. The building has since been completely restored with many lost crafts relearned in the restoration process, and it reopened its doors in 1995. Some "critical markers" remain where visitors can still see the history of the fire, for example many of the floorboards on the principal ground floor retain burn marks.

== Public access ==
The house is open to the public four days a week for most of the year other than Christmas.
