= Battle of South Harting =

1643 battle in the First English Civil War

Coordinates: 50.9697°N 0.8824°W

- Part of the First English Civil War
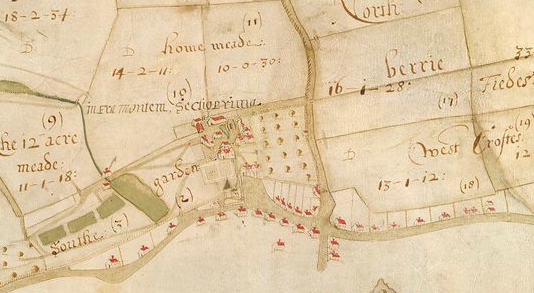
- 1632 map of South Harting 11 years before the battle
Date	Night of 23–24 November 1643^{(Jul. Old Style)}
Location	South Harting, West Sussex
Result	Royalist victory: Strategically meaningless

Belligerents
Royalists	Parliamentarians

Commanders and leaders
6 unnamed officers	Richard Norton

Units involved
Detachment of the Earl of Crawford's Regiment of Horse	Colonel Richard Norton's Regiment of Horse

Strength
~ 120	~ 400

Casualties and losses
~ 6 killed 5–6 wounded	~ 6 killed "very many" wounded 2 captured

The Battle of South Harting was a relatively small military engagement that took place on the night of 23–24 November 1643^{(Jul. Old Style)}/3–4 December^{(Greg. New Style)} in the village of South Harting, in West Sussex, England, during Lord Ralph Hopton's Southern Campaign of 1643–1644 during the second year of the First English Civil War.

It was fought between a Royalist detachment of the Earl of Crawford's Regiment of Horse who had quartered for the night in the village, and a Parliamentarian force consisting of Colonel Richard Norton and his own Regiment of Horse who later that night came upon Crawford's men seemingly by chance while they were resting in the various houses in the village — a fight then ensued.

The Royalist propaganda newsbook Mercurius Aulicus provides the only detailed albeit biased account of the engagement and describes how the Parliamentarians were defeated by the Royalists. In it, it claims Norton's 400 Parliamentarian horse and dragoons withdrew from the village the same night due to a desperate last-ditch act of deception carried out through a charge consisting of six mounted officers together with a boy, who made it appear as if a separate body of horse had been following Norton's regiment without their knowledge and had surprised them. It goes on to imply that Norton's men were dismounted and somewhat disorganised after having been ordered to split up into groups and spread themselves throughout the village to attack the various houses in the middle of the night and so, upon believing they were about to be engaged by a second mounted force, they withdrew from the village with some of the Royalists pursuing them.

Having been reported on just over two weeks later by the Mercurius Aulicus, it helped to boost morale in Royalist circles at the time, while discrediting the capabilities of the forces of Parliament and Colonel Norton, although it did nothing strategically to alter Hopton's Southern Campaign of 1643–1644, and the casualties on both sides published in the Royalist account by the Mercurius Aulicus, even though they might be exaggerated, appear to have been minimal.

== Background ==
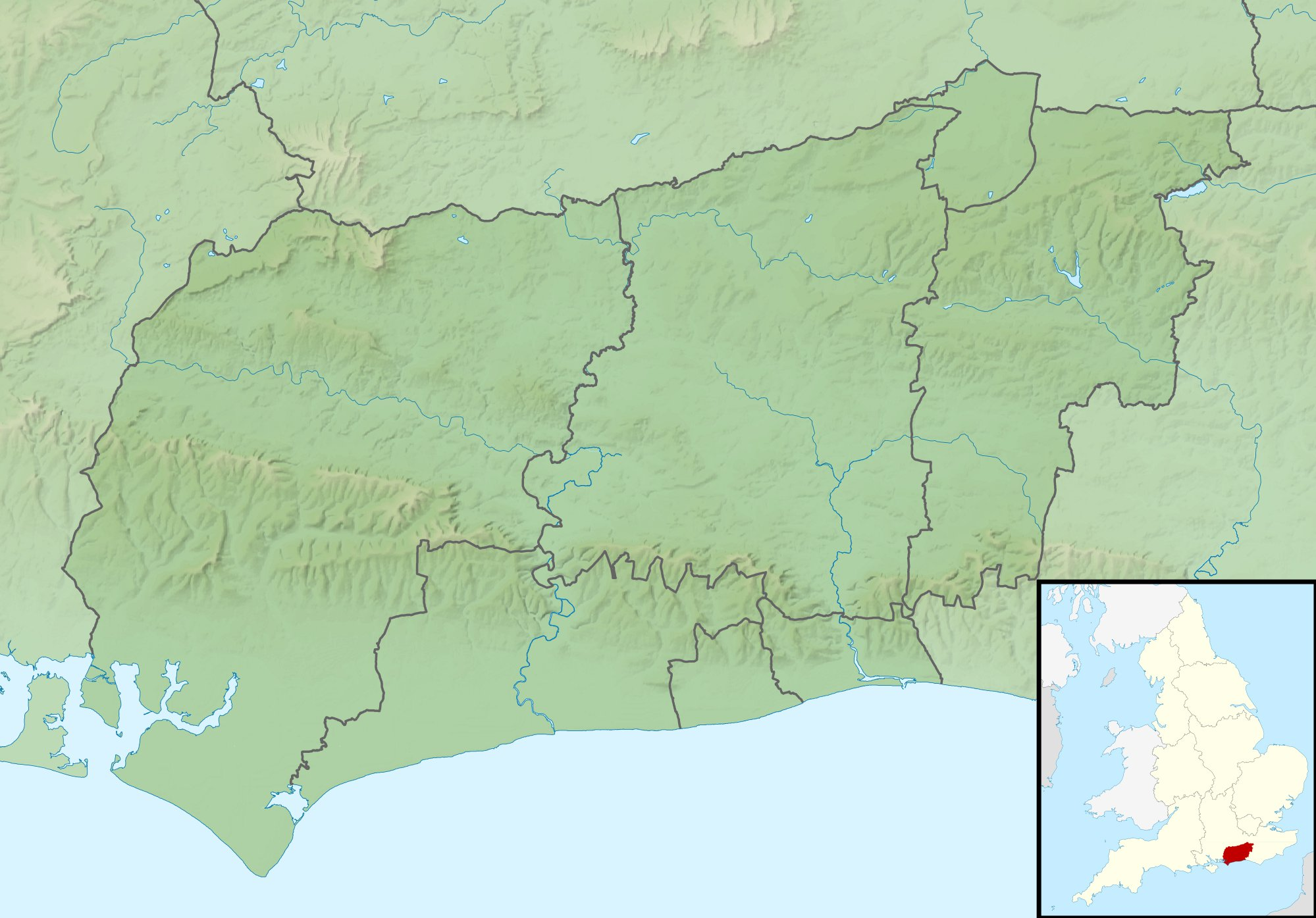
West Sussex; key locations in 1643 and South Harting (in yellow). The South Downs are visible stretching from south of Petersfield towards Lewes.

In November 1643, the First English Civil War had been running for fifteen months, since King Charles I had raised his banner in Nottingham and declared the Earl of Essex, and by extension Parliament, traitors. That action had been the culmination of religious, fiscal, and legislative tensions going back over fifty years.

=== State of the war in the South ===
During the invasion of Sussex during Lord Ralph Hopton's Southern Campaign of 1643–1644, South Harting was a strategic location for the Royalists being at the foot of a crossing over the northern side of the South Downs which acted as the first line of communication between Royalist-controlled Oxford and Winchester, and Arundel — which Hopton intended to take for the King. It was through South Harting from Petersfield, and then up the South Downs and past Sir William Ford's (Father of Sir Edward Ford) house and large estate at Uppark, and then back down the southern side of the South Downs through North Marden, that Hopton's horse advanced towards Arundel via. His foot took a different route bypassing the South Downs via East Meon to attack Lord Lumley's house at Stansted, just outside of Chichester. During Hopton's advance through Sussex, Colonel Norton's Regiment of Horse was employed as a fast and agile force used to harass Hopton's horse as they advanced on Arundel.

=== South Harting ===
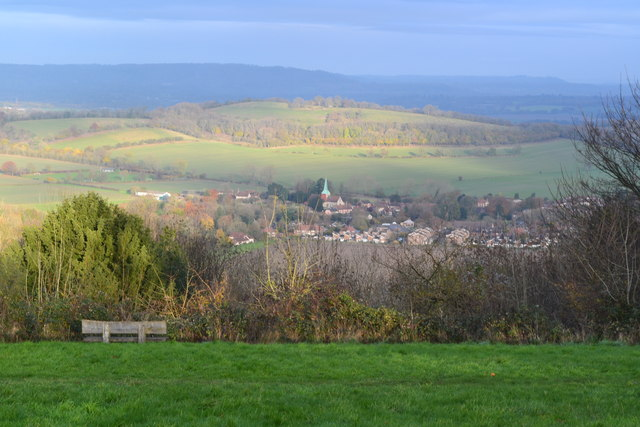
South Harting viewed from the south-southeast on the South Downs in 2013

In the period of 1641–1642 the total adult population of the parish of Harting, which included the village of South Harting, and the hamlets of West Harting and East Harting, can be estimated to have been roughly 400, (Note: An unnamed Protestation Returns of 1641–1642 record, which has since been attributed to South Harting by archaeologist Robert Garraway Rice, gives an adult male population (aged 18 or older) of 199. In the Sussex Record Society's transcript of the West Sussex Protestation Returns of 1641–1642, the transcript of the original document records the ministers who oversaw the Protestation for "Hartinge". South Harting was the main settlement in the parish and it is noted that West Harting was a "hamlet in South Harting" which suggests that the return was made for the Parish of Harting as a whole, including the hamlet of East Harting with West Harting and the main village of South Harting, but that Rice named the return for South Harting to refer to the entire parish. Assuming a population that is equally split in gender, and ignoring children (aged 17 or younger) who were not recorded, multiplying 199 by 2 gives a figure of 398 as a rough estimate for the total adult population of the parish of Harting in 1641–1642. Since this is a rough estimate, a figure rounded to 400 is the final estimated figure used in this article.) showing the parish was small but not insignificant in size just before the outbreak of the English Civil War. According to the archaeologist Robert Garraway Rice, during this time the parish itself was "extensive and important", and according to historian Henry Doddridge Gordon "the parish of Harting [at the beginning of the First English Civil War] might rival Basing" referring to its complete loyalty to the King and the Royalist cause. Despite its small population, the Parish contained five squires, one parson, and one yeoman, who were all united in their devotion to Charles I; namely Sir William Ford and his son Colonel Sir Edward Ford of the large Uppark estate in the south of the parish on top of the South Downs, the Catholic family of Sir John Caryll and his son also named John Caryll of the Harting Place estate in South Harting, and Major Cowper of Ditcham.

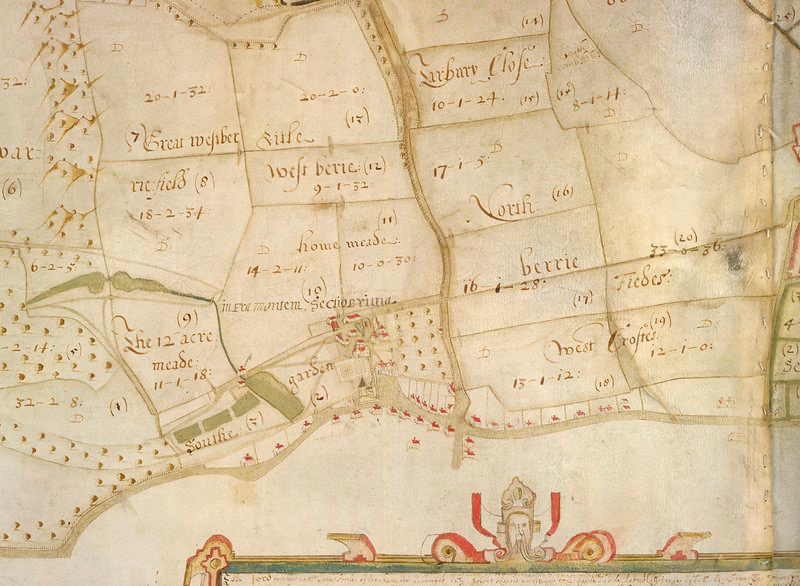
South Harting can be seen at the bottom of this 1632 map (north is on the right and the foot of the South Downs is on the left).

Harting Place was owned by Sir John Caryll and he and his family lived there in the manor house directly west of the Parish Church of Saint Mary and Saint Gabriel. It was the seat of the Manor of West Harting with the Manor of East Harting being owned by Sir William Ford. The two manors were split down the middle by the street that runs through the middle of South Harting, today literally called 'The Street'. Harting Place is described by archaeologist George Anelay as "a very impressive set of buildings" and is visible on the 1632 West Harting Manorial Map (pictured right); it had a large crenellated gatehouse immediately north of the church which was equally as big as the manor house and faced onto The Street, its own fenced private deer park, a large walled private garden between the church and the manor house, an orchard to the north, and four ponds to the south — the largest of which may have had its own water-powered mill.

== Prelude ==
According to the Royalist newsbook Mercurius Aulicus, who claim to have received their information from an eyewitness to the battle, during the middle of the night of 23–24 November 1643 roughly 120 (Note: The Mercurius Aulicus says that "about ſix-ſcore of the Earle of Craford's Regiment" rode into South Harting. 'Score' means 20 and therefore 'six-score' means six lots of 20, or more simply, 120.) men of the Earl of Crawford's Regiment of Horse rode into the village of South Harting. Tired, hungry, and weather-beaten from their ride during a rainstorm overhead that night, they took up their overnight quarter in the various houses within the village. The six highest-ranking officers, who are not named, quartered themselves in the manor house within Harting Place. Ludovic Lindsay, 16th Earl of Crawford, was Hopton's chief cavalry officer at the time, and Hopton was in command of a strong cavalry force just across the Harting and Sussex border in Hampshire from where this detachment presumably rode.

Dragoons were first introduced in the British Isles during the Wars of the Three Kingdoms when the first unit was raised 4 years previously in 1639 during the Bishops War. Dragoons were a highly mobile type of infantry who rode on horseback before dismounting to fight on foot. Ideally armed with a doglock musket, though sometimes armed with a less reliable matchlock musket, they lacked pikes and so were vulnerable to attack from both cavalry and regular foot alike. Because of this, they were not raised as regiments but instead as companies and usually one company was attached to a regiment of horse. They are considered by modern historians to have been experienced and tough soldiers. This is despite them being a 'jack-of-all-trades' since they served many purposes; namely to control large areas of the countryside — raiding, ambushing, and foraging for food and supplies quickly on horseback, while also being able to dismount and occupy or hold a bridge, hedgerows, or houses.

The lunar phase visible in the sky on the night of 23–24 November would have been very close to a full moon, which occurred just over a day later. Night time visibility was likely poor that night however, as the presence of a rainstorm mentioned by the Mercurius Aulicus suggests dense or overcast cloud coverage conditions which would have obscured the moonlight enough to have made it essentially useless for aiding visibility at night.

The Mercurius Aulicus goes on to describe how less than an hour after the detachment of the Earl of Crawford's Regiment of Horse had entered South Harting and as they were all resting or going to sleep, the Parliamentarian Colonel Richard Norton and his own regiment of horse numbering roughly 400 rode into the village unaware that Crawford's men were quartered there. After becoming aware of the Royalists' presence in the village and their relative defencelessness whilst resting or asleep, Norton took advantage of the situation and organised his men in preparation to ambush Crawford's men, who were still unaware of the Parliamentarians or what was about to happen.

== Battle ==
Colonel Norton had his men rank themselves into groups of ten where they were to then set about covering every doorway of every house in the village so that in theory no Royalist could escape. Norton then had his men shout "Horse! Horse!" in the street, and with the Royalists mistaking the calls as coming from their own officers, while simultaneously not knowing of the presence of Norton's regiment in the village, some ran out of the doorways of their houses only to be shot at or killed once presenting themselves within sight of Norton's dismounted dragoons. Most of the Royalists, realising what was happening and knowing that they could not get themselves or their horses onto the street without being shot at, fled through back alleys on foot to save themselves, thus leaving the Parliamentarians in control of the village. The Parliamentarians then went about the village shooting into all the houses and at all people.

The six officers and the boy who were sleeping in Harting Place were alerted by the gunfire and commotion outside and quickly realised that the village and their men had been surprised by the Parliamentarians. The six officers left the house with the boy and mounted their horses. Rushing along Tipper Lane, they cleverly positioned themselves between the South Downs and their enemy. The six officers and the boy charged towards Norton's 400 horse and dragoons in a seemingly suicidal act, shouting the signal "Follow! Follow! Follow!" as if they were leading a much larger force. During the darkness of the night, this gave the Parliamentarians the impression that more of Hopton's horse, while on their way to Arundel, hearing the gunfire in the village, had been signalled back and were charging down the South Downs in an avalanche of overwhelming numbers which was soon to be on top of them. This ingenious act of deception was executed with such "fury and undaunted courage" that it struck complete panic amongst the Parliamentarians, so much so that they were routed and driven back through the village in disorder with some half a dozen being shot dead by the six officers in the process. Either realising what was happening or perhaps also falling for the deception as the Parliamentarians had, small groups of two to three Royalist soldiers who were still present in the village left their hiding places and came out to where the Parliamentarians were fleeing in disorder, attacking them as they went past.

This chase of the Parliamentarians continued until the six officers, the boy, and the other Royalist soldiers who had come out of hiding, had forced them to flee over both hedge and ditch, killing as many of them as they had done of the Royalists; that being some half a dozen men, according to the Royalist chronicler reporting on the engagement in the Royalist Mercurius Aulicus, although the recorded number killed was possibly exaggerated at the time for reasons of morale and politics.

== Aftermath ==
=== Immediate aftermath ===
Two of Norton's men were taken prisoner including the Trumpeter and "very many" were wounded. The Royalists suffered 5 or 6 wounded with the Earl of Crawford's own Cornet being described as more so than the rest but not dangerously so. The Royalists captured numerous of Norton's horses, all their arms they had left behind, and Captain Thomas Betsworth's suit of arms among other things. When the Parliamentarians had been informed of the lamentable nature of their defeat at South Harting; some 400 horse and dragoons being routed by six officers and a boy, one of Norton's men solemnly swore the following:

By God we deſerve all to be Chronicled for the veryeſt cowards that ever lived.

— Mercurius Aulicus, page 709, 10 December 1643

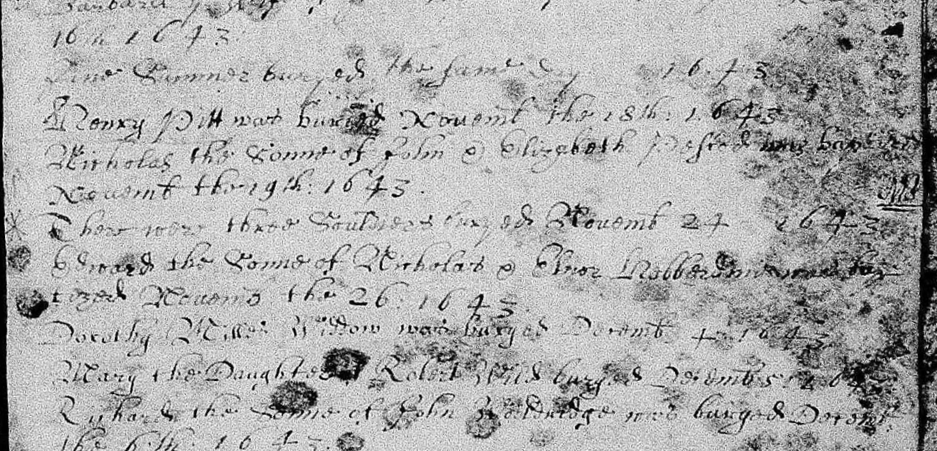
The South Harting parish register records: "There were three souldiers buryed Novemb 24 1643"

This incident naturally caused both amusement and delight amongst Royalist circles thus boosting morale, and dented the reputation of Colonel Richard Norton and his regiment at the time.

The South Harting parish register which would have been stored in the Parish Church of Saint Mary and Saint Gabriel records that on the following day: "There were three souldiers buryed Novemb 24 1643". Knowing the loyalty of the parish to the Royalist cause, it is possible that these "three souldiers" were Crawford's men who had been killed the previous night and were then buried in the churchyard which is directly adjacent to Harting Place, although their specific allegiance is not stated.

=== Mercurius Aulicus ===
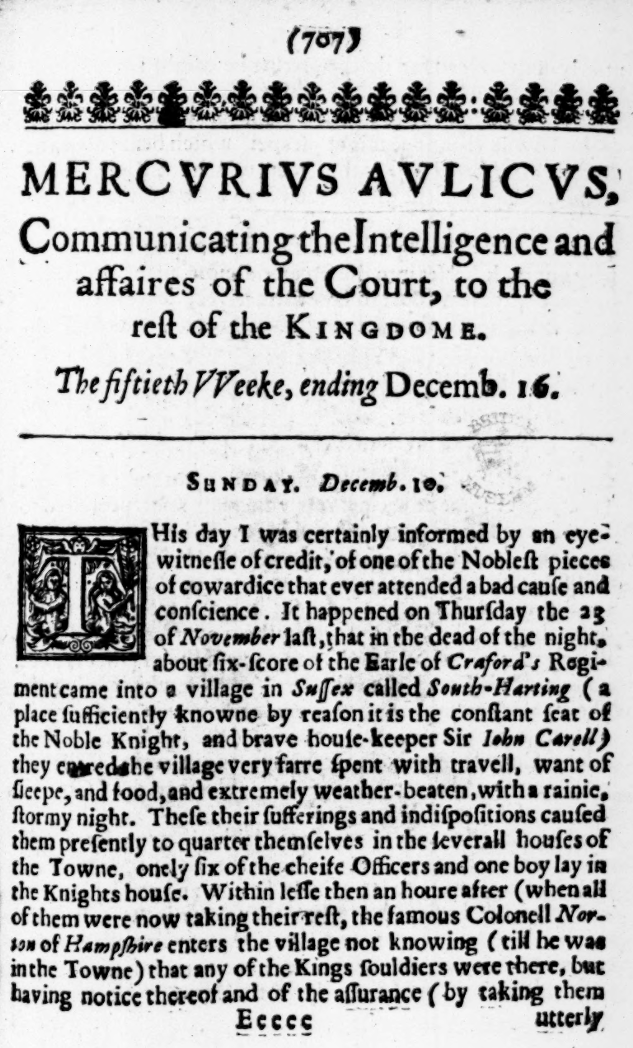
The front page of the 10–16 December 1643 issue of the Royalist newsbook Mercurius Aulicus describes an eyewitness account of the battle at South Harting.

An apparent eyewitness report of the battle was chronicled and published in the Mercurius Aulicus, Communicating the Intelligence and affaires of the Court, to the rest of the Kingdome, of Oxford, for the week of 10–16 December 1643. (Note: It reads the following in Early Modern English: This day I was certainly informed by an eyewitneſſe of credit, of one of the Nobleſt pieces of cowardice that ever attended a bad cauſe and conſcience. It happened on Thurſday the 23rd of November laſt, that in the dead of the night, about ſix-ſcore of the Earle of Craford's Regiment came into a village in Suſſex called South-Harting (a place ſufficiently knowne by reaſon it is the conſtant ſeat of the Noble Knight, and brave houſe-keeper Sir John Carell) They entred the village very farre ſpent with travell, want of ſleepe, and food, and extremely weather-beaten, with a rainie, ſtormy night. Theſe their ſufferings and indiſpoſitions cauſed them preſently to quarter themſelves in the ſeverall houſes of the Towne, onely ſix of the chiefe Officers and one boy lay in the Knights houſe. Within leſſe then an houre after (when all of them were now taking their reſt, the famous Colonell Norton of Hampſhire enters the village not knowing (till he was in the Towne) that any of the Kings ſouldiers were there, but having notice thereof and of the aſſurance (by taking them utterly unprovided for defence) that he might ſafely ſhew a brave proofe of his valour, he cauſed his men to ranke themſelves ten and ten, and ſo to make good every doore and houſe of the Towne that none might eſcape: which being done, the Rebells cry Horſe Horſe in the ſtreet, which the Kings ſouldiers miſtaking to be the call of their owne Commanders, offered in diverſe places to come forth, but were preſently ſhot, or killed, ſo that ſeeing no poſſibility of bringing forth themſelves or their horſes into the ſtreete, almoſt all of them fled by back-wayes on foote to ſave themſelves, leaving the Rebells outragiouſly domineering in the Towne, ſhooting into all houſes, and at all perſons, and barbarouſly uſing ſuch of the Kings men as their valour enabled to make any oppoſition. In this hurly-burly, word was given to the ſixe Officers in the Knights houſe, how the Towne and their ſouldiers were ſurprized by the Rebells. Theſe six men with one boy preſently tooke horſe, ruſhing out by a backe lane upon the 400 Rebels (for ſo have ſome of their owne company ſince proteſted to have been their number) and crying out Follow, Follow, Follow, (as if they had already chaſed them) charged in upon them with ſo much fury and undaunted courage that they routed them preſently and drove them (killing and wounding them) quite through the Towne, forcing them over hedge and ditch killing as many as the Rebells had done of theirs (that is ſome halfe a dozen), taking 2 priſoners (one of which being the Trumpeter) wounding very many, having but 5 or 6 of theirs and but one of theſe much wounded (the Earle of Crafords owne Cornet) but not dangerouſly, and brought off all their own Armes and divers of the Rebels Horſe with all Captaine Betſworth's ſute of Armes, &c. The Rebells having ſince beene faithfully acquainted with the truth of their beating, and how that their 400 Horſe and Dragooners, were ſo lamentably beaten and chaſed away by only 6 men and a boy (but when they were in their chaſe and flight, here and there 2 or 3 ſouldiers ſtept out of the places where they lay hid and lent ſome blows to their fellows). One of the Rebels ſwore ſolemnely in theſe true and remarkable words, By God we deſerve all to be Chronicled for the veryeſt cowards that ever lived. — Mercurius Aulicus, pages 707–709, 10 December 1643)

This account of the events — the only known written account describing in detail the events of the battle to survive to the present day — describes the Parliamentarian forces who are referred to as rebels as being cowardly and barbarous, parallel to the Royalists who are referred to as the King's soldiers described as being valiant and courageous. It has evidently been retold in a way which glorifies the Royalist cause, their men, and their abilities, and vilifies the Parliamentarians'.

The Mercurius Aulicus is known to have been employed as a form of Royalist propaganda and so in combination with the language used in its account, it can be assumed that some parts are somewhat exaggerated for the sake of boosting the morale of its readers, and discrediting Parliament and Colonel Richard Norton and his regiment.

=== Oral tradition ===
As late as 1878 there was a vague local oral tradition that "Oliver" had been in South Harting and that there had been some sort of fight in the Culvers field in the village, which adjoined the vicarage and was adjacent to the Church on the east side of the main road running through the village. This oral tradition could have originated from this battle that took place there on the night of 23–24 November 1643, but it may have also been referring to the later engagement that occurred the following month in December 1643 also involving Colonel Norton's and Crawford's horse. It is possible that this second engagement took place on the Culvers field and is the origin of the oral tradition instead, although which one is the cause of it is not known due to the vagueness of the oral tradition.
