= Nyewood =

Village in West Sussex, England

Coordinates: 50.98992°N 0.85847°W

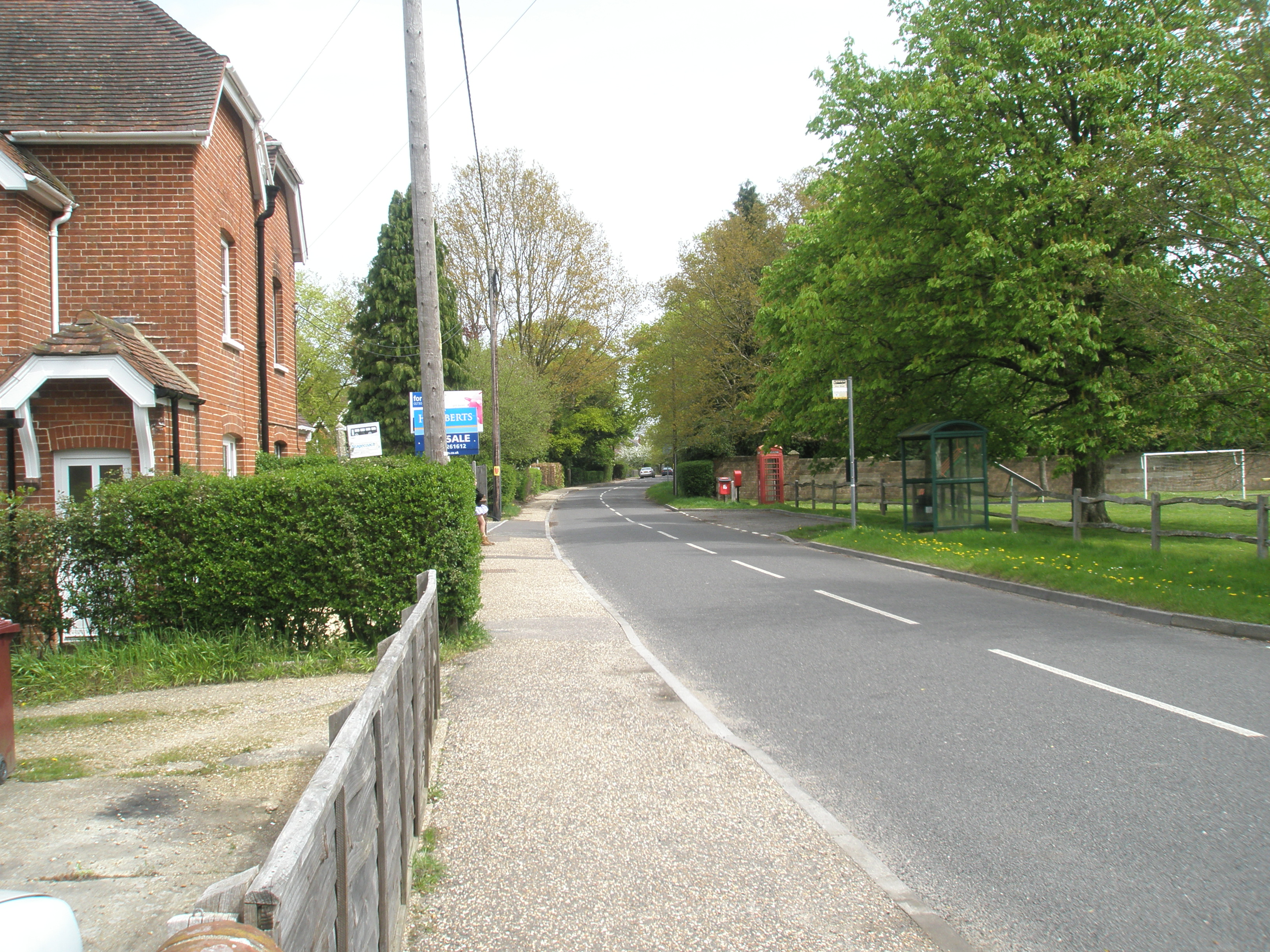
- The centre of Nyewood

- Location within West Sussex
- Population: 138 (2001)
- OS grid reference: SU803218
  - London: 49 miles (79 km) NE
- Civil parish: Harting
- District: Chichester
- Shire county: West Sussex
- Region: South East
- Country: England
- Sovereign state: United Kingdom
- Post town: PETERSFIELD
- Postcode district: GU31
- Dialling code: 01730
- Police: Sussex
- Fire: West Sussex
- Ambulance: South East Coast
- UK Parliament: Chichester

Nyewood is a village in the Chichester district of West Sussex, England, in the Western Rother valley. The village is on an unclassified road between Rogate and South Harting, the hub of the Harting civil parish that also includes the smaller settlements at West and East Harting. It is in the South Downs National Park.

== History ==
Nyewood, in various spellings, is mentioned in Salzman's History, as being associated with the manor of Harting. The earliest known record is 1658 when it comprised enclosed meadows. There was a large brick works at Nyewood. Although it predated the railway, it had not been profitable until the coming of the railway, after which, with its own siding, it was employing 60 men and producing 100,000 bricks a day with an international reputation. It encouraged the opening of two pubs in the village. Nyewood brick, tile and glass are represented in the Brick and Tile Making exhibit at the nearby Weald and Downland Museum. A local brewery, Ballard's, founded in 1980, was moved to The Old Sawmill in Nyewood in 1988, but closed in 2018. Before closure it had been producing 1,500 gallons of beer a week. There is light industry in the village.

== Transport ==
Nyewood is on an unclassified road between Rogate and South Harting. It was also an intermediate station on the ”Middy”, a rural railway line that ran between Petersfield and Midhurst. Nyewood station was called "Rogate for Harting" as the hamlet was barely known. It opened in 1864. The line closed in 1955. The station buildings were being used for offices in 2002.

== Listed buildings ==
There is a listed building in Nyewood: Champs, a farmhouse with an 18th century front on a probably earlier building.

== Notable people ==
Nyewood resident Albert William Bleach was born in the village and lived there until his death at the age of 99; he was appointed MBE for his services to the community.

Gilbert White owned property in Nyewood when he lived nearby in East Harting in the 18th century.

== The Nyewood Nye committee ==
The Nyewood Nye committee is a group of people who arrange activities in the The Henry Warren Hall, the village's only public building.
