= Courante uyt Italien, Duytslandt, &c. =

First Dutch newspaper, published in June 1618

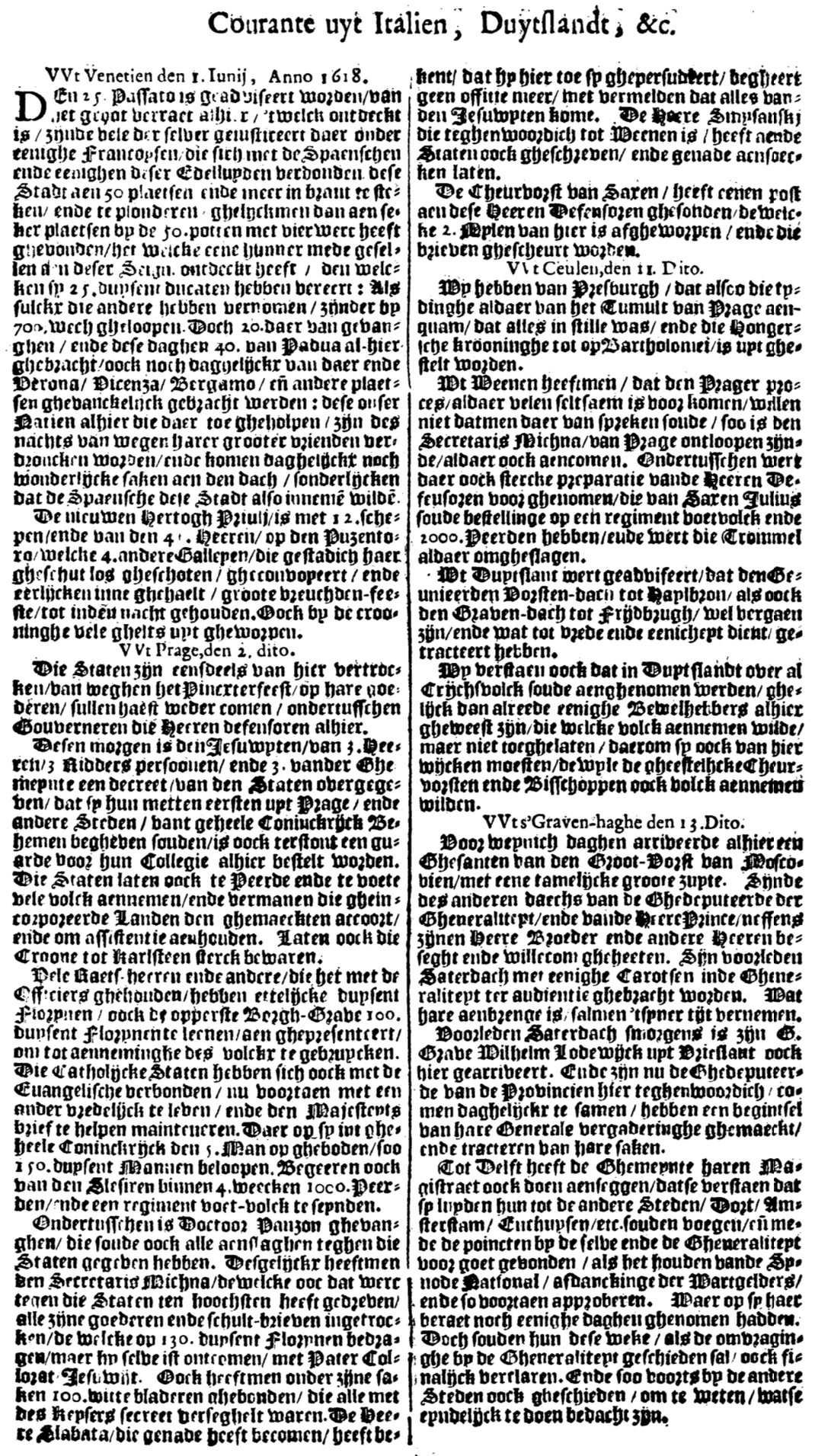

Courante uyt Italien, Duytslandt, &c. ("Current Events from Italy, Germany, etc.") was the first Dutch newspaper. It began appearing in Amsterdam in June 1618 and was a regular weekly publication. The Courante can be called the first broadsheet paper, because it was issued in folio-size. Before this, news periodicals had been pamphlets in quarto-size.

The paper carries no imprint of the printer or the publisher. Similar papers published later suggest that it may have been printed by Joris Veseler and published and edited by Caspar van Hilten. The exact date of the publication is not known, but the dates of the news items suggest that it was probably printed between 14 and 18 June 1618.

The word "Courante" in the title of this and other news publications went on to supply the Dutch word for newspaper, krant (previously spelled courant, a spelling that is still used in the titles of many Dutch newspapers).

== Format and typography ==
The Courante was a single folio sheet. This means it was a full sheet folded once to form 4 pages and then cut open at the fold. The first issues were printed on just one side of the sheet. It also does not have a serial number, a date or a publisher's imprint. These features are now considered essential to newspapers. The imprint appeared in 1619. The date and serial number as well as the practice of printing on both sides of the sheet started in 1620.

The first issue presented news from four sources, including Venice, Cologne and Prague. This corresponds with the name of the newspaper, which in English means "Current events from Italy, Germany, etc". The main text runs in two columns. The columns are separated with a gutter and a line running in it. There are no empty lines within the body text. The body of the text is printed in Dutch black-letter, except for the numbers. Roman type is used for datelines which also act as headlines for the news items. The text is fully justified and the beginnings of paragraphs are identified with indents approximately the size of the line-height.

The only surviving copy of the first issue is in Sweden's Kungliga Biblioteket in Stockholm. Later issues from 1628 to 1664 can be found at the Koninklijke Bibliotheek in The Hague.

The Courante appeared until about 1672 and was then merged with the Ordinarisse Middel-Weeckse Courant and the Ordinaris Dingsdaegse Courant into the Amsterdam Courant, which eventually merged with De Telegraaf in 1903.

== Influence ==
- Stanley Morison and some other authors regard the Courante as the world's first newspaper in a typographical sense, being the first to print the news in columns rather than across the full width of the page. On this basis, they categorise news periodicals such as the German Relation: aller Fürnemmen und gedenckwürdigen Historien and Avisa Relation oder Zeitung not as "newspapers" but as "newsbooks".
- Two years after starting the Courante, Veseler printed the first newspaper in English for the publisher Pieter van den Keere. It followed the format of the Courante, known to English bibliographers as a coranto.
- The first news periodicals in English to be printed in England used the more widespread newsbook format. However, in 1665 the Oxford Gazette was published following the Dutch style and that ended the era of the newsbooks in England.

== See also ==
- List of newspapers by date

== Sources ==
- Dahl, F. (1946) Dutch corantos, 1618–1650 : a bibliography : illustrated with 334 facsimile reproductions of corantos printed 1618–1625, and an introductory essay on 17th century stop press news. Koninklijke Bibliotheek, The Hague.
- Morison, S. (1980) "The Origins of the Newspaper". In Selected Essays on the History of Letter-Forms in Manuscript and Print, (Ed, McKitterick, D.) Cambridge University Press, Cambridge.
- Morison, S. (1932) The English Newspaper : Some Account of the Physical Development of Journals Printed in London Between 1622 & the Present Day. Cambridge University Press, Cambridge.
