= List of hills of West Sussex =

This is a list of hills in West Sussex. Many of these hills are important historical, archaeological and nature conservation sites, as well as popular hiking and tourist destinations in the county of West Sussex in southeast England.

== Colour key ==
Class	Prominence
Marilyns	150 – 599 m
HuMPs	100 – 149 m
TuMPs	30 – 99 m
Unclassified	0 – 29 m

The table is colour-coded based on the classification or "listing" of the hill. The types that occur in West Sussex are Marilyns, HuMPs and TuMPs, listings based on topographical prominence. "Prominence" correlates strongly with the subjective significance of a summit. Peaks with low prominences are either subsidiary tops of a higher summit or relatively insignificant independent summits. Peaks with high prominences tend to be the highest points around and likely to have extraordinary views. A Marilyn is a hill with a prominence of at least 150 metres or about 500 feet. A "HuMP" (the acronym comes from "Hundred Metre Prominence) is a hill with a prominence of at least 100 but less than 150 metres.

In this table Marilyns are in beige and HuMPs in lilac. A "TuMP" as defined here is a hill with a prominence of at least 30 but less than 100 metres. The term "sub-Marilyn" or "sub-HuMP" is used, e.g. in the online Database of British and Irish Hills to indicate hills that fall just below the threshold. To qualify for inclusion, hills must either be 200 metres or higher with a prominence of at least 30 metres, below 200 metres with a prominence of at least 90 metres (the threshold for a sub-HuMP) or be in some other way notable. For further information see the Lists of mountains and hills in the British Isles and the individual articles on Marilyns, HuMPs and TuMPs. A "TuMP" as defined here is a hill with a prominence of at least 30 but less than 100 metres. By way of contrast, see also the article listing Tumps (a traditional term meaning a hillock, mound, barrow or tumulus).

== Table ==
Hill	Height (m)	Prom. (m)	Grid ref.	Class	Parent	Range/Region	Remarks	Image
Black Down	280	191	SU919296	West Sussex county top (historical and current), Marilyn, HuMP, TuMP	Beacon Batch	Greensand Ridge	West Sussex's county top. Knoll at summit in trees, 30 m NNE of trig point.	
Littleton Down	254.9	149.2	SU941149	HuMP, TuMP, subMarilyn	Butser Hill	South Downs	West Sussex's second highest point Summit in trees	
Linch Down	248	111	SU848173	HuMP, TuMP	Butser Hill	South Downs	West Sussex's third highest point No summit feature. Summit is 15 metres ENE of the trig point.	
Glatting Beacon	245	98	SU965131	SubHuMP, TuMP	Butser Hill	South Downs	Trig point at summit.	
Beacon Hill	242	95	SU965131	SubHuMP, TuMP	Butser Hill	South Downs	Tumulus at summit.	
Chanctonbury Ring (Chanctonbury Hill)	240	217	TQ138120	Marilyn, HuMP, TuMP	Leith Hill	South Downs	Summit on western edge of ring.	
Harting Downs	229	68	SU794183	TuMP	Butser Hill	South Downs	Grassy summit.	
Devil's Dyke	217	114	SU794183	HuMP, TuMP	Ditchling Beacon	South Downs	Summit within 2 metres of trig point.	
Marley Heights	216	53	SU890302	TuMP	Black Down, Sussex	South Downs	Beech tree on summit, east of the farm.	
Truleigh Hill	216	67	TQ225108 (est.)	TuMP	Ditchling Beacon	South Downs		
West Harting Down	216	80	SU762187	TuMP	Butser Hill	South Downs		
Kithurst Down	213	111	SU762187	HuMP, TuMP	Butser Hill	South Downs	Featureless summit; 5 metres south of trig point.	
Farm Hill	212	63	SU961145	TuMP	Butser Hill	South Downs	Crop field at summit.	
Hatch Farm Hill	211	43	SU898298 (est.)	TuMP	Black Down	South Downs		
West Hill	211	89	TQ279117	TuMP	Ditchling Beacon	South Downs	No summit feature.	
Barlavington Down	208	55	SU961155	TuMP	Butser Hill	South Downs	No summit feature. Arable field.	
Telegraph Hill, Sussex	207	130	SU870264	HuMP, TuMP	Black Down	South Downs	Summit is 5 metres NW of a bungalow.	
Bow Hill	206	74	SU824112 (est.)	TuMP	Butser Hill	South Downs		
St Roche's Hill	206	57	SU877110 (est.)	TuMP	Butser Hill	South Downs		
Wolstonbury Hill	206	66	TQ283138 (est.)	TuMP	Ditchling Beacon	South Downs		
Bedham Hill	155	122	TQ014221	HuMP, TuMP	Black Down	South Downs	Flat, featureless summit, partly covered in trees.	
Thorney Island	6	6	SU765019 (est.)	"Significant Island of Britain"	None		Possible alternative summit by church.	

== See also ==
- List of mountains and hills of the United Kingdom
- List of Marilyns in England
