= Marchamont Nedham =

Marchamont Nedham, also Marchmont and Needham (1620 – November 1678), was a journalist, publisher and pamphleteer during the English Civil War who wrote official news and propaganda for both sides of the conflict.

A "highly productive propagandist", he was significant in the evolution of early English journalism, and has been strikingly (if hyperbolically) called the "press agent" of Lord Protector Oliver Cromwell.

== Early life ==
Nedham was raised by his mother, the innkeeper of The George Inn, Burford, Oxfordshire, after his father's death. His stepfather was the vicar of Burford and teacher at the local school. He was educated at All Souls College of Oxford University. After college he became an usher at the Merchant Taylors' School, and then a clerk at Gray's Inn. He also studied medicine and pharmacology.

== Civil War ==
=== Mercurius Britanicus ===
Nedham came to prominence in 1643 when he began working on Mercurius Britanicus, a weekly newsbook espousing the parliamentary politics of the era, mainly written as a response to the royalist Mercurius Aulicus of John Birkenhead. The Britanicus was originally edited by Captain Thomas Audley, but it has been suggested that Nedham was responsible for the content much earlier, as the style changed little when he took over in May 1644. Britanicus was more overtly polemical and savage than the satirical Aulicus; often refuting the royalist title point for point. Nedham also personalised the debate, declaring that Aulicus was "So full of lying and railing, that I think he is afflicted by all the pimp." The publication of Charles I's personal letters which were captured after the Battle of Naseby was a significant propaganda coup for the parliamentary forces. However, when Nedham began to launch attacks on the personality of the king and mock his stammer he drew censure from the House of Lords from members who felt he had gone too far. When Nedham again attacked the king during delicate negotiations with the Scots in May 1646, he was sent to the Fleet prison for two weeks for seditious libel. Upon his release he was banned from publishing but probably authored some of the many anonymous pamphlets around at the time.

=== Mercurius Pragmaticus ===
Reportedly Nedham obtained an audience with King Charles I, and gained a royal pardon. Despite his history of writing parliamentary propaganda, he was commissioned to print a Royalist periodical, Mercurius Pragmaticus, starting in September 1647 and continuing for two years. It has been claimed as "one of the wittier and less ephemeral" of the "Cavalier weeklies". Pragmaticus opened each issue with a satirical poem directed at various parliamentary figures and is notable for the quality of its sources. Nedham certainly didn't tone down any of the scandalous nature of his personal attacks, referring to Cromwell at various points as "Copper- Nose," "Nose Almighty," and "The Town-bull of Ely." Although he was responsible for the majority of issues, this particular newsbook was notable for the number of counterfeits that it inspired, with as many as 17 different versions available at various times. While some would have been created to trade off the name of the original to make money, there seems to be disagreement as to who owned the "true" Pragmaticus. It seems that some fellow royalists had never really accepted that Nedham had changed sides in good faith, calling him a "turne-coat and inveterate enemy to the late king." In this way they attempted to remove him from the paper.

== Interregnum ==
=== Mercurius Politicus ===
The triumph of the Parliamentarians in the Civil War led to Nedham's incarceration in Newgate Prison in June 1649; he gained his release in November by switching sides again. The result was perhaps his most significant enterprise, the weekly periodical Mercurius Politicus, which he used as a platform for the Commonwealth regime (Nedham received a government payment of £50 in May 1650, probably to start this venture). This third Nedham weekly began in June 1650, on a light note: "Why should not the Commonwealth have a Fool as well as the King had?" — but soon settled into a more serious vein as a voice of the republican movement of the day. He rested the case for the Commonwealth on arguments similar to those of Hobbes: that "the Sword is, and ever hath been, the Foundation of all Titles to Government", and that it was hardly likely that the Commonwealth's adversaries would ever succeed in their designs.

Politicus continued for the next decade, the term of the Commonwealth era, under alternative titles like the Public Intelligence or Public Intelligencer. In 1655 Cromwell rewarded Nedham with an official post, so that Nedham was then perceived as a spokesman for the regime, albeit under the editorial aegis of John Thurloe, spymaster of Cromwell.

With the royalist faction suppressed or in exile abroad, Nedham turned away from his previous scurrilous reporting and aimed to educate his readers in political principles of humanism and republicanism. As the early radicalism of the Commonwealth began to wane, the revolutionary ideas expressed in Politicus also softened, with a greater emphasis on the merit of a stable state. This did not mean that he did not on occasion criticise some of the conservative and authoritarian aspects of Cromwell's Protectorate and, like others, called for a return to more republican ideals. The newspaper was widely read in England and Europe amongst exiles and Europeans alike. Another significant innovation was the inclusion of regular advertising.

Nedham was associated with a set of influential republican writers of his generation, a circle that included Algernon Sidney, Henry Nevile, Thomas Chaloner, Henry Marten – and John Milton. Milton, as a secretary to the Council of State in the early 1650s, would have overseen Nedham's publishing activity; later, the two men reportedly became personal friends.

Nedham was notable as an advocate of the commercial interests of emerging capitalism in preference to the pillars of the older order. In 1652, he wrote that commercial interest "is the true zenith of every state and person...though clothed never so much with the specious disguise of religion, justice and necessity". Consistent with this outlook, Nedham translated John Selden's Mare Clausum (1636) as Of the Dominion or Ownership of the Sea (1652).

== Restoration ==
Nedham predicted and wrote pamphlets agitating against the restoration of the monarchy and when the king returned he went into hiding, possibly in Holland, but was able to return to England after obtaining a pardon (allegedly purchased with a bribe). Nedham helped his case by re-printing some poems, written in Mercurius Pragmaticus, while supporting Charles I during the late 1640s. He retired from political pamphleteering and worked as a doctor, although he did not entirely avoid publishing, producing two pamphlets on education and medicine.

One final foray into the field of political writings came in the mid-1670s when he wrote several pamphlets attacking the Earl of Shaftesbury. The motive for these seems to have been simply money; but he used the occasion to renew his attacks on Presbyterianism, and his final pamphlet before his death in 1678, a call for war against the French, was probably sincere.

== Style ==
Nedham's particular style and philosophy can be summarised by his proposal for Mercurius Politicus in 1650:

the design of this pamphlet being to undeceive the people, it must be written in a jocular way, or else it will never be cried up: for those truths which the multitude regard not in a serious dress, being represented in pleasing popular airs, make music to the common sense, and charm the fancy, which ever sways the sceptre in vulgar judgement, much more than reason.

Nedham used mockery, satire and a biting wit to attack his enemies and generate as much controversy as possible. He believed that a popular audience needed to have humour in addition to the more serious business of news. Propaganda would only be effective with a large circulation. He often invokes the Roman Republic as an ideal model for a government without a monarch. Later, he would also use the self-interest theories of Henri, Duke of Rohan and Machiavelli to compare the motivations for each side's actions and predicting the ensuing political climate. He pioneered this kind of analysis of an ongoing event and used it to determine his own stance

== Character assessment ==
Nedham's political reversals were depicted as dishonest; but he seems to have regarded religious toleration, usually advocated by the king's party, as the best way to cure the political problems of the times. Presbyterianism, and the Scots in general, he attacked at almost every opportunity. His writing continued to be influential among the Whigs.

In the 18th century, Nedham's theories of republicanism were severely criticised by American Founding Father John Adams in the third volume of his A Defence of the Constitutions of Government of the United States of America (1787–88).

In the next century, Nedham's name was used as a pseudonym by other republican political writers; both John Adams and Josiah Quincy Jr. published pieces signed "Marchmont Nedham" in the early 1770s.

Nedham's later reputation was coloured by the apparent cynicism and opportunism of his wavering allegiances, and by hostility towards his republicanism from subsequent generations of English critics. Yet even some hostile critics have conceded his literary talent and his influence. Sympathetic modern commentator Paul Rahe has called Nedham "the world's first great journalist".

== Selected works by Nedham ==
- The Levellers Levell'd, 1647
- The Case of the Commonwealth of England Stated, 1650
- The Excellencie of a Free-State 1656
- A Short History of the English Rebellion, 1661
- A Discourse Concerning Schools and Schoolmasters, 1663
