= Henry Muddiman =

English journalist and publisher (1629–1692)

- Born: Henry Muddiman
- Baptised: February 5, 1629
- Died: March 7, 1692 (aged 63)
- Education: St John's College, Cambridge
- Occupation: Journalist

Henry Muddiman (1629 – 7 March 1692) was an English journalist and publisher active after the restoration of the monarchy, in 1660.

Muddiman was born in the Strand, London. He was educated at the choir school of St Clement Danes and, from 1647, at St John's College, Cambridge (from which he did not graduate, perhaps because part of the college was used as a jail by the parliamentarians during the Second English Civil War). He then worked as a school teacher.

He began producing two regular newsbooks – Parliamentary Intelligencer and Mercurius Publicus – in late 1659 on the proceedings of the newly reconvened Rump Parliament. This seems to have been at the suggestion of George Monck, who also received good publicity. On 16 April 1660 this role was secured when all other such journals were banned particularly those of Marchamont Needham the chief Cromwellian publisher. Muddiman received a monopoly of print along with arch-royalist John Birkenhead as a supervising editor.

Muddiman lost the right to publish the journals three years later when it was handed to Roger L'Estrange. He would transform the subtle propaganda of the newsbooks into heavy-handed political polemics leading to the rights being returned to Muddiman in 1665. By that time, Muddiman had established a good business distributing hand-written details of parliamentary proceedings which he was not allowed to print. Once the rights were returned he began publishing The London Gazette which remains the oldest surviving English newspaper. With a short hiatus over the Exclusion crisis, when there were attempts to suppress all publications, he retained exclusive rights until the Glorious Revolution of 1688. At the change of regime he was considered too close to the previous incumbents and retired, dying in 1692.
