= Torberry Hill =

Hillfort in West Sussex, England

Coordinates: 50.976852°N 0.891776°W

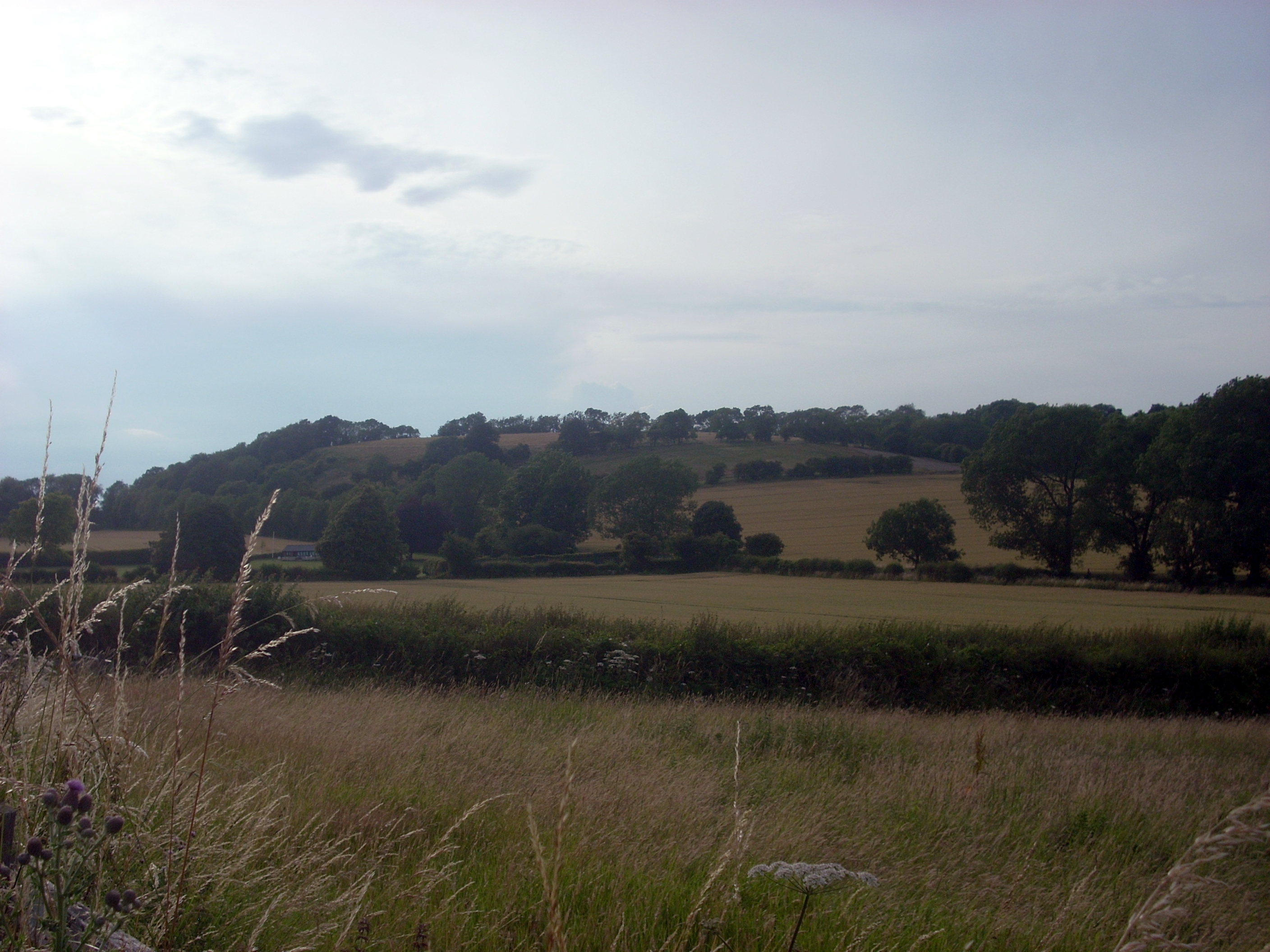
South side of Torberry Hill viewed from South Harting

Torberry Hill (also spelled Tarberry Hill and Torbery Hill) is an Iron Age hillfort in the county of West Sussex, in southern England. It is a Scheduled Ancient Monument, with a list entry identification number of 1015966. The hill fort is located within the parish of Harting, within the South Downs National Park. The hill includes the remains of an Early Iron Age univallate hill fort (c. 800–300 BC), a Middle Iron Age promontory fort (c. 300–100 BC) and a post-medieval post mill. The hill is a chalk spur projecting northwards from the South Downs.

== Geology and land use ==
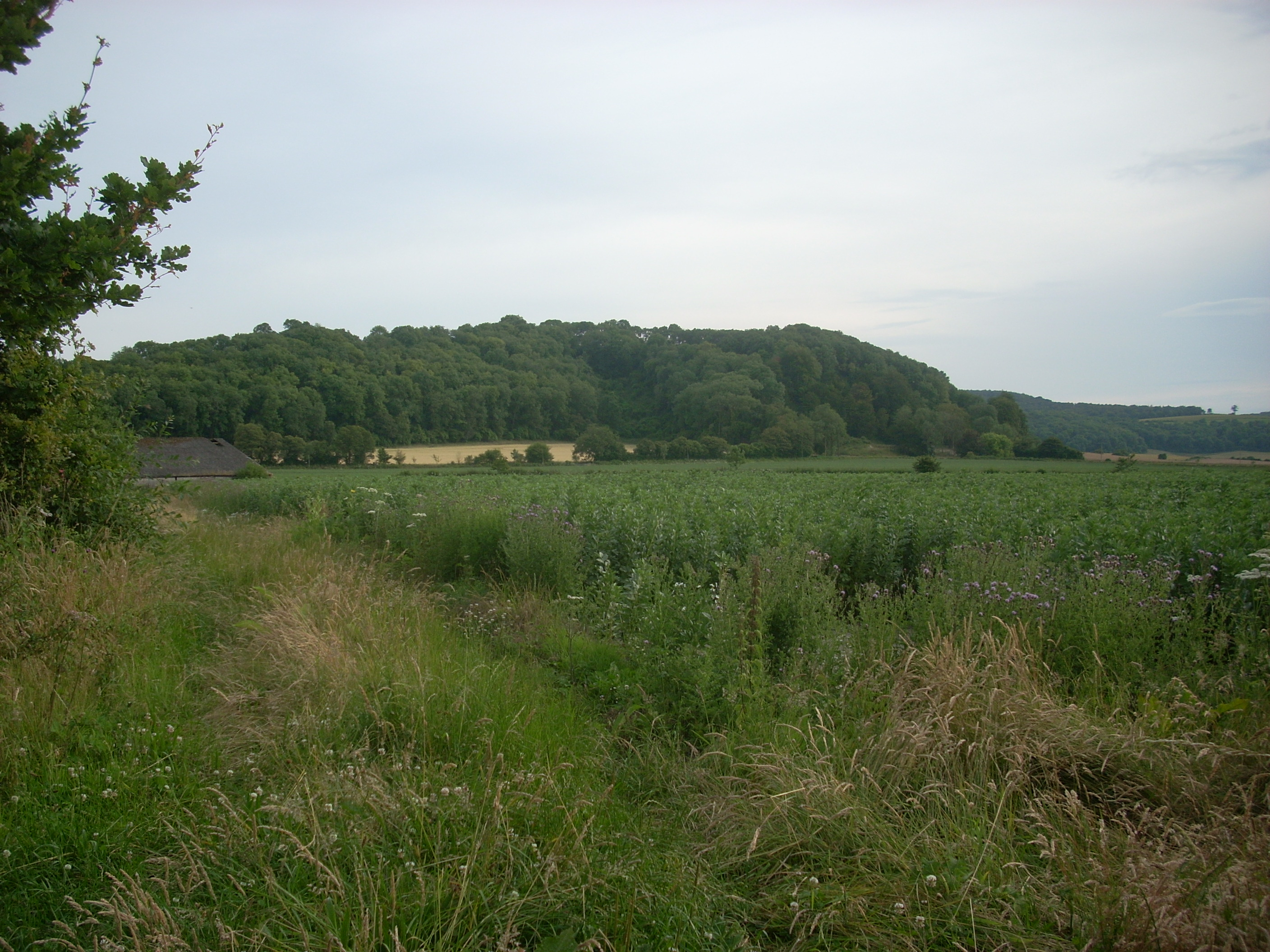
North side of Torberry Hill viewed from West Harting

The bedrock of Torberry Hill consists of Zig Zag Chalk at the summit, overlying West Melbury Marly Chalk. Torberry Hill is characterised by farmland with woodland on the steep slopes. Torberry Hill features former grazing land that is reverting to woodland. Records indicate that Torberry Hill was common pasture by 1399, when fines were issued for the trespass of over 700 sheep in violation of stinting limits. By the mid-16th century Torberry Hill was farmed as arable land, and it had been divided into enclosures by 1632.

== Description and excavations ==
The fort was partially excavated in 1948 and from 1956 to 1958. It is roughly pear-shaped and covers and area of 2.8 hectares (6.9 acres); it is aligned approximately east–west. The fort has been damaged by ploughing in the early post-medieval period, and the rampart survives as a low bank and a largely ploughed-in ditch. The interior of the fort contained a number of infilled storage pits; potsherds recovered from them date them to the Iron Age. Pottery from Torberry Hill is very similar to that recovered from the Trundle. Other finds from Torberry Hill include a curry comb, two knives, an iron spearhead and a horn weaving-comb; all these artefacts were placed in Lewes museum.

The rampart of Torberry has been classified as a Low Dump Rampart. This consisted of a rampart that was approximately 3 metres (10 ft) high, with a ditch that may have been as deep as the rampart was high. The rampart was asymmetrical in cross-section, with a gently tapered internal slope and a steep external face with an angle between 50° and 60°. The northern section of the rampart is downhill from the interior, and the enclosed area adjacent to it is too steep for settlement.

== Site history ==
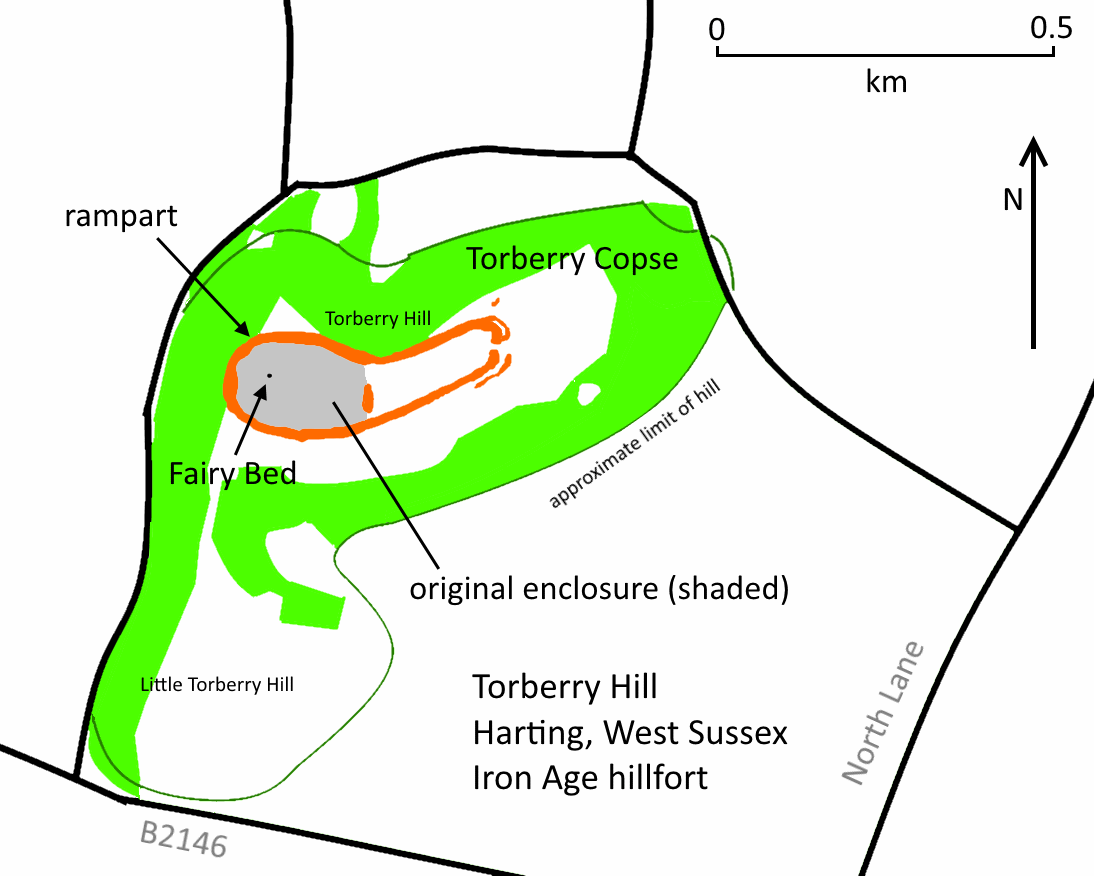
Map of Torberry Hill

Archaeologists discovered possible traces of pre-hillfort activity, dating to the 6th century BC. Evidence from pottery suggest that occupation on the hill had its origin in the Late Bronze Age. Torberry hill fort underwent its earliest phase of construction between the 5th and 3rd centuries BC, when the defences of the promontory fort were built. A ditch, no longer extant, ran north–south, bordered by a bank reinforced with a timber palisade, defending the western portion of the hill. Access was via a simple entrance. It has been suggested that Torberry hillfort was built to replace the nearby hilltop enclosure on Harting Beacon; this conjecture is supported by the known chronology of the two sites. The defences were extended in the 3rd century BC to enclose the whole hilltop; a new entrance was built on the east side and the north–south rampart across the middle of the hill was levelled, and used to fill the accompanying ditch. The entrance was redesigned in the 2nd century BC as a stone-walled passageway curving inwards towards a sizeable timber gate. The stone-reinforced walls replaced earlier timber walls, originally erected as retaining walls to hold back the flanking ends of the rampart. The timber was later replaced with stone facing, in parallel with advances in hillfort construction techniques. Due to the soft local chalk, stone for building the retaining walls had to be imported. In about 100 BC, this gate was destroyed. The interior of the fort has traces of sporadic activity that continued into the Roman period (43–409 AD).

In the post-medieval period, a post mill was built in the western portion of the fort, upon the highest part of the hill. It survives only as a low cross-shaped mound, approximately 10 metres (33 ft) across, which is known locally as the Fairy Bed.

== Folklore ==
In folklore, Torberry Hill was said to have been formed when the Devil burnt himself tasting hot punch from the Devil's Punch Bowl in Surrey. He flung his spoon aside in anger, thus forming Torberry Hill. Local folklore holds that an unspecified treasure is buried on Torberry Hill. In 1877 a rhyme was recorded as:

Who knows what Tarberry would bear
Would plough it with a golden share

More recently, the rhyme has shifted to make a golden ploughshare a prerequisite for recovering the treasure:

He who would find what Torbery would bear
Must plough it with a golden share

Fairies are said to dance upon Torberry Hill on Midsummer Eve.
