= Mercurius Politicus =

Journal of England

Mercurius Politicus was a newsbook that was published weekly from June 1650 until the English Restoration in May 1660. Under the editorship of Marchamont Nedham, it supported the republican governments. From 1655 until 1659 it had a monopoly on news publication.

== History ==
Mercurius Politicus was Marchamont Nedham's most significant enterprise, which he used as a platform for the Commonwealth regime (Nedham received a government payment of £50 in May 1650, probably to start this venture). Nedham had previously written for Mercurius Brittanicus, a Parliamentarian paper, and then Mercurius Pragmaticus, a Royalist paper that "tore unrelentingly into the weaknesses and shortcomings of the new republic" . The publishing of Mercurius Pragmaticus had landed him in Newgate Prison as a political prisoner. Nedham offered to put his skills at the disposal of the new republic if he were let out. However, Nedham had a reputation for unreliability due to his history of writing for both Parliamentarian and Royalist papers. Therefore, Nedham was let out in order to write for the republic, but John Milton, an "utterly committed republican" was assigned to vet each issue that Nedham was to release. This third Nedham weekly began in June 1650, on a light note: "Why should not the Commonwealth have a Fool as well as the King had?" – but soon settled into a more serious vein as a voice of the republican movement of the day. He rested the case for the Commonwealth on arguments similar to those of Hobbes: that "the Sword is, and ever hath been, the Foundation of all Titles to Government", and that it was hardly likely that the Commonwealth's adversaries would ever succeed in their designs. Politicus continued for the next decade, the term of the Commonwealth era, under alternative titles like the Public Intelligence or Public Intelligencer. In 1655 the Lord Protector Oliver Cromwell rewarded Nedham with an official post, so that Nedham was then perceived as a spokesman for the regime.
