= Rogate railway station =

Former railway station in Sussex, England

Coordinates: 50.9901°N 0.8550°W

Rogate
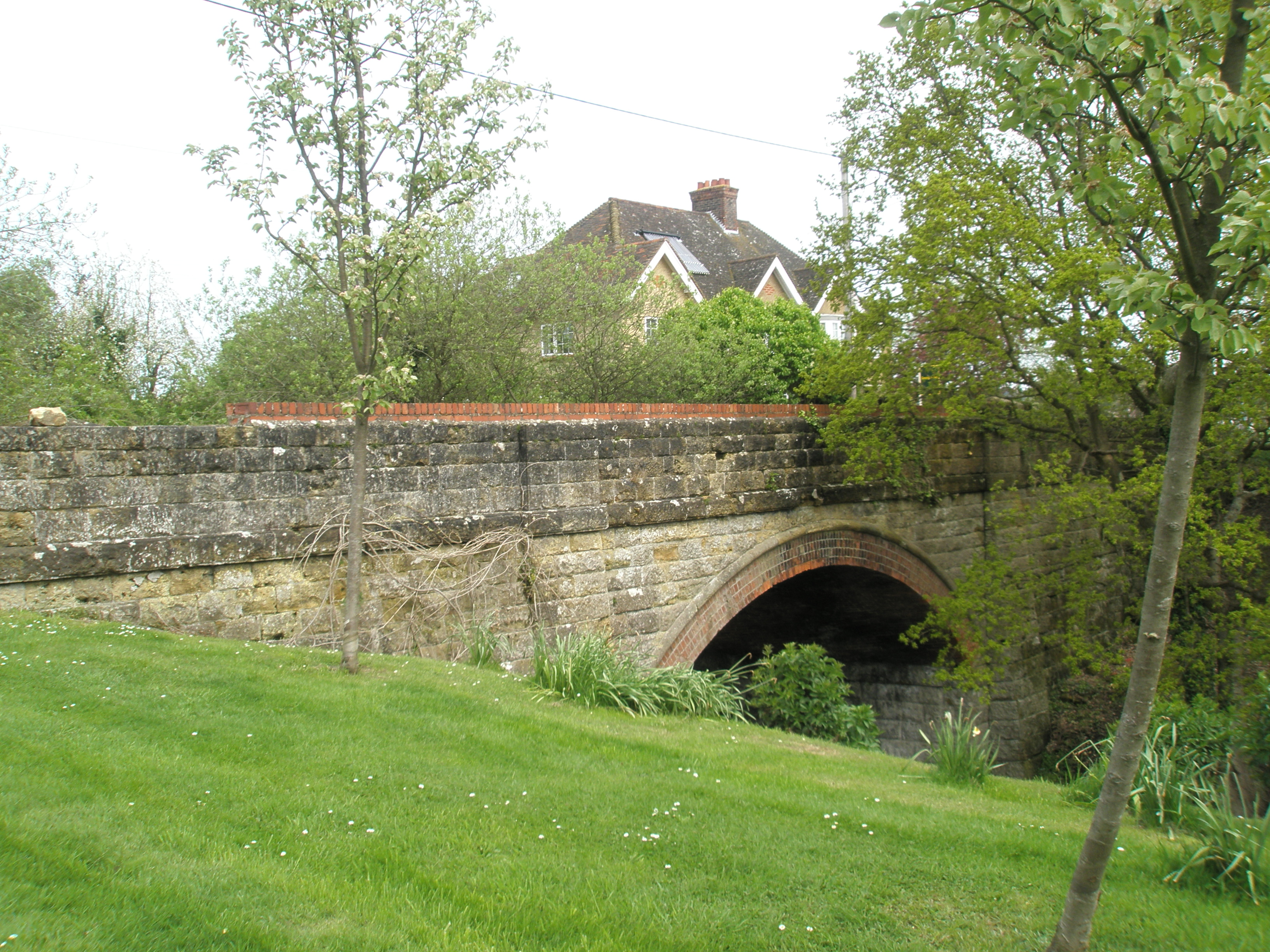
- Railway bridge at site of old station

General information
- Location: Rogate, Chichester, West Sussex; England
- Grid reference: SU804218
- Platforms: 2 until 1932 (1 since 1932)

Other information
- Status: Disused

History
- Pre-grouping: London and South Western Railway
- Post-grouping: Southern Railway; Southern Region of British Railways

Key dates
- 1 September 1864: Station opened
- 7 February 1955: Station closed
Location

Rogate railway station, also known variously as Rogate for Harting, and Rogate and Harting, supposedly served these two villages in the county of West Sussex in England. However the station was 1 1/2 miles (2.4 km) away from both of these places, and was in fact in the village of Nyewood.

The station was on the former London and South Western Railway line between Petersfield and Midhurst. The line opened on 1 September 1864. Rogate station originally featured two platforms controlled by a fully operational signal box, however from 1932 the box was only used for the handling of trains for the goods yard. The line closed to all traffic after the last train on 5 February 1955.

The station is now used as offices.

Preceding station	Disused railways	Following station
Petersfield	Midhurst Railways	Elsted
