= Keef =

Keef may refer to:

- Kief, cannabis preparation

== People ==
- Keith Richards (born 1943), English guitarist
- Keef Hartley (1944–2011), English drummer
- Keef Trouble (born 1949), English musician
- Keef Cowboy (1960–1989), American rapper
- Keefy Keef (born 1974), American rapper
- Chief Keef (born 1995), American rapper
- Phoebe Keef, (1898–1978), British archaeologist
- Keith Knight (cartoonist) (born 1966), American cartoonist

== Other ==
- Keef the Thief, 1989 video game
- Alan Keef, British engineering company
- Keith, a character from Voltron
- Keef, a character from Invader Zim

== See also ==
- Keith (disambiguation)
