= Phoebe Keef =

British archaeologist (1898–1978)

P. A. M. Keef FSAS
- Born: 1898; Amritsar, India
- Died: 1978 (aged 79–80) (Note: The Society of Antiquaries of Scotland reported Keef's death during 1978–79.)

Academic work
- Discipline: Archaeology
- Institutions: Sussex Archaeological Society; Society of Antiquaries of Scotland

Phoebe Keef (1898–1978) was a field archaeologist and was elected as a Fellow of the Society of Antiquaries of Scotland in 1938. She directed several excavations, including work at East Dean Park and Harting Beacon, both in Sussex.

== Biography ==
Keef was born in Amritsar in 1898, during the British Raj, and her family later moved to England where she went to school. Keef's father died when she was 3 years old. During the First World War, Keef worked for the YMCA and the St John's Ambulance, and received a medal for her work with the YMCA.

In 1934 Keef completed a diploma in archaeology, studying at University College London. In 1938 she volunteered at the excavation of Angmering Roman villa. She also excavated at Chester hill fort in Scotland in 1939.

Keef worked at a hospital during the Second World War, and was a hospital librarian, but in 1941 was allowed time away from the hospital to join excavations at Angmering. Two years later she took part in 'The Conference on the Future of Archaeology' at the Institute of Archaeology in London, contributing to a discussion on the role of archaeological societies.

Keef directed excavations at the hillfort known as Harting Beacon between 1948 and 1952; the results were largely unpublished aside from a note in The Antiquaries Journal, however, Owen Bedwin later published a summary of the excavations in the Sussex Archaeological Collections based on Keef's notes accessed after her death. Keef ran the West Sussex excavation group. With the group she excavated a Romano-British farmstead near Lambs Lea in Sussex in 1953–54.

== Selected publications ==
- Keef, Phoebe (1940). "Flint-Chipping Sites and Hearths on Bedham Hill near Pulborough". Sussex Archaeological Collections. 81: 215–237. doi:10.5284/1086692.
- — (1945). "Excavations at Chester Hill Fort, Hundleshope, in Manor Parish, 1939". Proceedings of the Society of Antiquaries of Scotland. 80: 66–73. doi:10.9750/PSAS.080.66.73.
- — (1945). "Angmering Roman Villa Site: Interim Report on Excavations, 1941". Sussex Archaeological Collections. 84: 83–107. doi:10.5284/1085960.
- — (1953). "Two gold penannular ornaments from Harting Beacon, Sussex". Antiquaries Journal. 33 (3–4): 204–206. doi:10.1017/S0003581500059400.
- Keef, Phoebe; Wymer, J. J.; Dimbleby, G. W. (1965). "A Mesolithic Site on Iping Common, Sussex, England". Proceedings of the Prehistoric Society, London. 31: 85–92. doi:10.1017/S0079497X00014730.
