= Caspar van Hilten =

Dutch newspaper publisher (died c. 1623)

Caspar van Hilten (bef. 1583 – c. 1623) was the editor and publisher of the first Dutch newspaper, the Courante uyt Italien, Duytslandt, &c., printed in Amsterdam from June 14, 1618. He had, in effect, been a press officer for the army of Maurice of Nassau before becoming a publisher. His son Jan van Hilten (c.1603–1655) was born in Hamburg, presumably when Caspar was there as a press officer. Van Hilten was a bookseller as well as (or instead of) a publisher. After his death in 1622 or 1623, the business was continued by Jan, who started to publish the weekly newspaper on a regular day (Saturday). In 1649, Jan van Hilten's bookstore was located on the Beursstraat in a house named (In) de geborduuerde Handtschoen ("(In) the Embroidered Glove").

== Life and career ==
Van Hilten likely came from Hamburg, where he had a son. His son, Jan van Hilten, would later take over his printing duties. Van Hilten moved from Germany to the Dutch Republic, where he became a newspaperman in the army of Maurice of Nassau. This meant writing news for the army.

After his military career, Van Hilten moved to Amsterdam, where he settled in the "gecroonden Hoedt" (Crown's House) in the late 1610s. This was a stock exchange opposite Dam Square. From there, he published the Courante, which he also translated into French from 1620 onwards. This newspaper was called Courant d'Italie et d'Almaigne and had the same layout as the original. This was the first French-language newspaper to be printed in Europe: the Parisian newspaper Gazette did not appear until 1631.
