= Mercurius Aulicus =

Royalist newspaper in English Civil War

Mercurius Aulicus was one of the "most important early newspapers" in England, famous during the English Civil War for its role in Royalist propaganda.

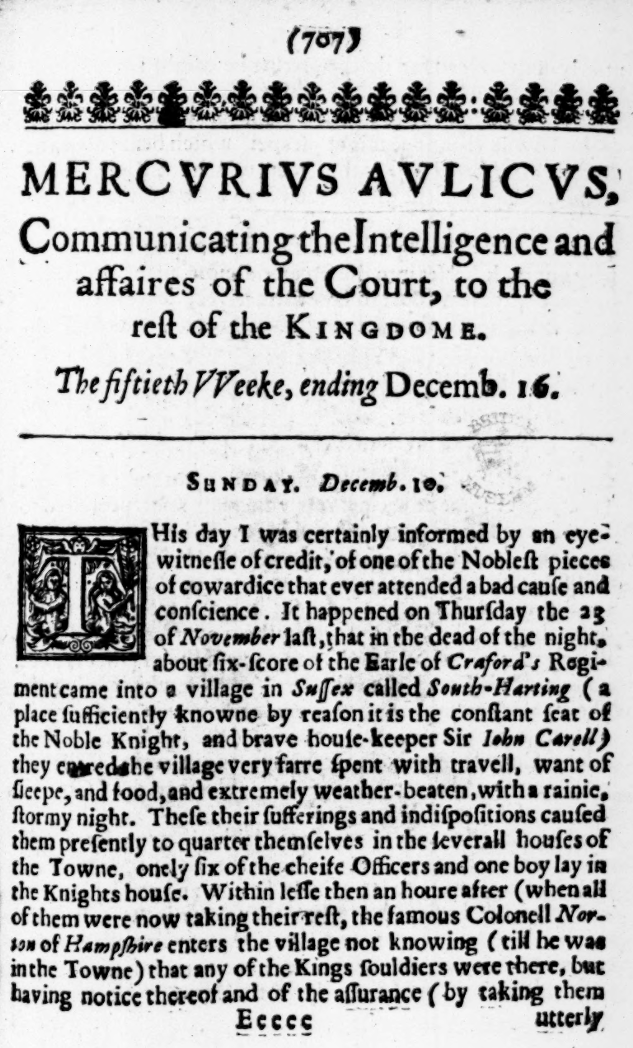
The front page of the 10–16 December 1643 issue of the Mercurius Aulicus describes an eyewitness account of a skirmish at South Harting.

== Creation ==
The Mercurius Aulicus newspaper originated during the English Civil War from a suggestion by George Digby, a key advisor to King Charles I, that the Royalist faction needed a method for promoting their views in Parliament-held London. As a result, the publication was established in January 1643 - it is variously termed either a newspaper or a newsbook - the latter being an alternative term for this form of weekly news publication in a quarto format.

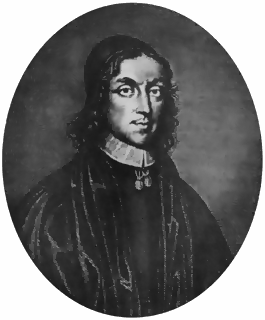
Peter Heylin, one of the key writers behind the Mercurius Aulicus

John Birkenhead, a Fellow of All Souls College in Oxford, was appointed editor of the newspaper, receiving updates on events around the country from Digby's contacts, although his colleague Peter Heylin appears to have done much of the practical editing himself. The Mercurius Aulicus was printed in Oxford, which was at this time during the war the Royalist capital, for a penny a copy, then smuggled into London where it was sold on by local women, often at heavily inflated prices. It was also reprinted on occasion - albeit not necessarily accurately - by local sympathisers in London itself. When logistics made it impossible to print a copy for several weeks, Birkenhead would resort to including gaps in page numbers and issues to give the impression that the reader had merely missed a specific copy that had no doubt been delivered elsewhere across the country satisfactorily.

== Impact on the industry ==
The Mercurius Aulicus has been considered one of the "most important early newspapers" in England. The newspaper revolutionised the industry in England, initiating the idea of popular journalism as a political tool for dividing and mobilising popular opinion. Prior to the Mercurius, newspapers had purported to portray facts, avoiding commentary on current events - by contrast, the Mercurius represented the Laudian, or more extreme, end of Royalist opinion, openly smearing and mocking its opponents in a way that was quite novel for the period.

== Final days ==
The publication began to go downhill from 1644 onwards. As the Royalist defeats on the battlefield continued, the Oxford publication found it harder and harder to obtain current news and issues became badly delayed. The Mercurius Aulicus finally closed in 1645.

== Bibliography ==
- Clarke, Bob (2004). From Grub Street to Fleet Street: an Illustrated History of English Newspapers to 1899. Aldershot: Ashate.
- Peacey, Jason (2004). Politicians and Pamphleteers: Propaganda during the English Civil Wars and Interregnum. Aldershot: Ashgate.
- Sommerville, Charles John (1996). The news revolution in England: cultural dynamics of daily information. Oxford: Oxford University Press.
- Thomas, Peter William (1969). Sir John Berkenhead, 1617-1679: a Royalist career in politics and polemics. Oxford: Clarendon Press.
- Wedgwood, C.V. (1970). The King's War: 1641-1647. London: Fontana.
- Wilcher, Robert (2001). The Writing of Royalism, 1628-1660. Cambridge: Cambridge University Press.
