= Harting =

Village and parish in West Sussex, England

Coordinates: 50.97°N 0.88°W

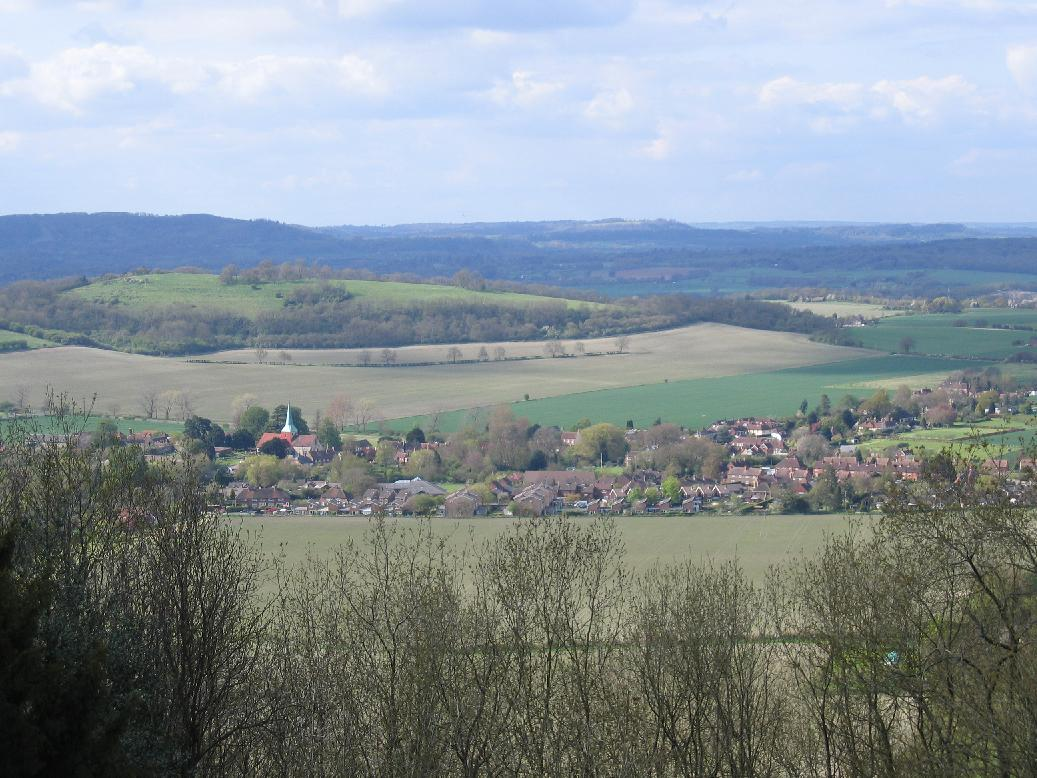
- South Harting seen from Harting Down

- Location within West Sussex
- Area: 32.16 km^{2} (12.42 sq mi)
- Population: 1,451 (2011)
  - Density: 44/km^{2} (110/sq mi)
- OS grid reference: SU786215
  - London: 48 miles (77 km) NE
- Civil parish: Harting
- District: Chichester
- Shire county: West Sussex
- Region: South East
- Country: England
- Sovereign state: United Kingdom
- Post town: PETERSFIELD
- Postcode district: GU31
- Dialling code: 01730
- Police: Sussex
- Fire: West Sussex
- Ambulance: South East Coast
- UK Parliament: Arundel and South Downs
- Website: Parish Council

Harting is a civil parish in the Chichester District of West Sussex, England. It is situated on the northern flank of the South Downs, around 3.5 miles (5.6 km) southeast of Petersfield in Hampshire. It comprises the village of South Harting and the hamlets of East Harting, West Harting and Nyewood and extends as far north as Durford.

The area of the parish is 3,216 hectares (7,950 acres). At the 2011 Census, the population was 1,451, an increase from 1,407 at the 2001 Census.

== History ==
Harting was listed in the Domesday Book (1086) under the ancient hundred of Dumpford as the large Manor of Hertinges, which included 196 households encompassing South, West and East Harting. They were 134 villagers, 42 smallholders and 20 slaves. With resources including ploughing lands, meadows, woodland and nine mills, it had a value to the lords of the manor of £100. The joint lords were the church of St Nicholas, Arundel, and Earl Roger of Shrewsbury.

Apart from three generations of the Earls Montgomery the manor was in the possession of the Crown until 1610 when it was granted to the Caryll family. In 1746 the manor was purchased by the Featherstonhaugh (/ˈfænʃɔː/ FAN-shaw) family, in whose possession it remains.

Kelly's Post Office Directory of 1867 lists numerous names, trades and establishments in the parish, including shops, school, farms, mill, brickworks and five public houses.

== Listed buildings ==
There are 90 listed buildings in the parish, mostly in the village of South Harting, but some in the outlying hamlets.

== Harting Downs ==
The villages are overlooked by Harting Downs, a 550-acre (2.2 km^{2}) upland owned by the National Trust and part of the Sussex Downs Area of Outstanding Natural Beauty. Rising to 229 metres (751 ft), it offers panoramic views over the Weald to the north, and the English Channel and the Isle of Wight to the south.

Archaeological evidence has suggested that Harting Downs were first occupied around 5000 years ago. Neighbouring Beacon Hill is home to a hillfort from the Iron Age, built around 500 BC as an animal enclosure and refuge. In addition, a cross ridge dyke was built around the same time, may have been used to control movement of people and animals along the ridgeway.

Because of its elevation, Beacon Hill hosted a station in the shutter telegraph chain, from 1796 to 1816, which connected the Admiralty in London to its naval ships in Portsmouth and Plymouth. This was replaced in 1822 by a semaphore station which operated on a slightly different route until 1847.

Bertrand Russell and his wife Dora founded the experimental Beacon Hill School at Telegraph House, which was their residence in 1927.

West of Beacon Hill is Tower hill, on top of which is the Vandalian Tower, a folly dating to the 18th century which is in the grounds of Uppark house. It was built to celebrate the founding of the American colony of Vandalia in 1774, though the events of the American Revolution meant that the colony never got off the ground. The tower is in ruins and cannot be entered, but can be seen from outside.

Large areas of the downs have never been used for modern intensive farming and are thus important sites representing the chalk grassland that once covered the South Downs. Plants found include quaking grass and the common spotted orchid. The down supports animals such as adders, skylarks and several species of butterfly.

== Governance ==
The civil parish extends south beyond the villages, north as far as Durford, west to Elsted and east to the boundary with Hampshire. An electoral ward of the same name covers this parish and the neighbouring parishes of Elsted and Treyford and Trotton with Chithurst. The ward's population at the 2011 Census was 2,026.

== See also ==
- Harting Old Club
- Torberry Hill

Next station upwards	Admiralty Shutter telegraph line 1795	Next station downwards
Blackdown	Beacon Hill	Portsdown Hill

Next station upwards	Admiralty Semaphore line 1822	Next station downwards
Holder Hill	Beacon Hill	Compton Down, Compton
