= Gilbert Mabbot =

Gilbert Mabbot, alternately Mabbott (1622—c. 1670), was the official licenser of the press from 1647 to 1649 and himself a pioneering journalist and publisher of newsbooks during the English Civil War period.

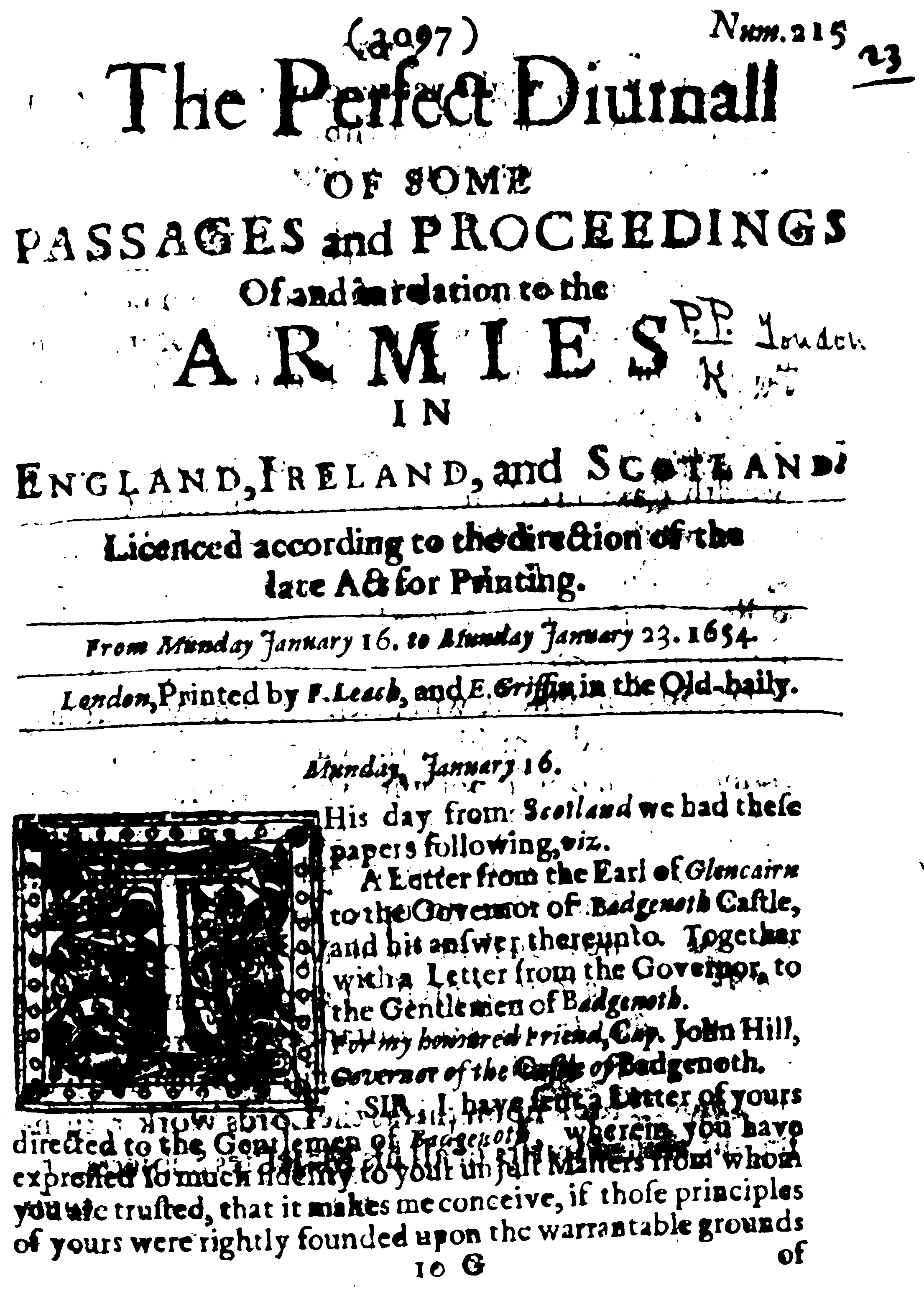
Front cover of the Perfect Diurnall for January 16–23, 1654, with which Mabbot was associated.

== Background ==
Mabbot was the son of Edward Mabbot, a cobbler or cordwainer from Nottingham and had been appointed in 1643 as an assistant to John Rushworth who was clerk-assistant to the House of Commons and later Secretary to the Army. Mabbot became a prolific writer of newsletters to individual correspondents and assisted Rushworth in compiling the Historical Collections as a contemporary history of the civil war period. He appears to have assisted Samuel Pecke in compiling the Perfect Diurnall newsbook from 1642 to 1655.

== Army connections ==
Rushworth had gathered much of his material from the primitive newsbooks which pioneered the publication of news, and which he encountered as part of his service as a licenser of the press. He used his influence to appoint Mabbot as his deputy from March 1645. Both were dismissed in March 1647 but Mabbot was appointed as Rushworth's successor on 30 September 1647 after a request from Thomas Fairfax, Commander-in-Chief of the Parliamentary Army. It is possible Mabbot was an ally of the Levellers, an important faction in the Army who wanted to declare a Republic, abolish the House of Lords, and institute a government which was purely democratic over the whole sphere of public life.

== As licenser of the press ==
As licenser, Mabbot had the power to withhold a license to publish from those newsbooks which displeased him; however, he was progressively less successful. His name frequently appears on newsbooks of the period but was often used without his permission.

He did notably attempt to suppress a newsbook that expressed royalist sentiments, the Moderate Intelligencer, edited by John Dillingham, who in June 1648 inserted a new sentence (in French), in an issue that had first appeared on 11 May 1648: "Dieu nous donne les Parlements briefe, Rois de vie longue." ("God gives us brief Parliaments, [and] Kings of long life.") Mabbot made arrangements with the printers who had handled the Moderate Intelligencer, to print in its stead a newsbook he edited, which was more in tune with Army policy. This he called The Moderate, which was numbered as if it was a continuation of the Moderate Intelligencer and included statements such as "I have laid down my former title of 'Moderate Intelligencer' and do go by another, viz. 'The Moderate'". However, Mabbot was thwarted by Dillingham finding an alternative printer and successfully appealing to the House of Lords, to stop Mabbot from confusing his readers. Thereafter, publication of Mabbot's The Moderate was moved to a different day of the week. It eagerly supported the abolition of the monarchy and welcomed the beheading of King Charles I; its account of the King's funeral is the most complete.

== Activities during the Commonwealth ==
Mabbot was either dismissed or resigned his position as licenser of the press in May 1649, John Rushworth resuming his previous duties. During the Commonwealth Mabbot held important posts as official agent for the town of Leith and as supplier of news to the city of Kingston upon Hull. He was the brother-in-law of Sir William Clarke, Secretary to the Army, and kept in touch with him as a news source; he also regularly corresponded with Henry Cromwell, Lord Lieutenant of Ireland.

== Later life ==
After the restoration of King Charles II, Mabbot obtained in January 1661 the office of manager for licences of wines and strong waters in Ireland. He moved to Dublin where his attempts to enforce licensing led to a complaint from members of the Holy Trinity Guild against his aggression. As a result of this complaint he agreed to surrender his office to the crown in June 1664 in return for £4,800. Mabbot appears to have died in around 1670 when he was named in an Irish Chancery suit.

== Sources ==
- 'Gilbert Mabbott' in Oxford Dictionary of National Biography
- The Trial of King Charles the first by J.G. Muddiman (Hodge, London, 1928)
