= John Birkenhead =

British political writer and journalist

Sir John Birkenhead or Berkenhead (c.1617 – 4 December 1679) was an English political writer and journalist, imprisoned several times during the Commonwealth for his obtrusive royalism.

Birkenhead was the supposed son of Randall Birkenhead (c.1580 – 1636) and Margaret Middleton (d. 1669). The parish register of Witton-cum-Twambrooks records a baptism for John Birkenhead, son of Randall, in 1616 [O.S. 24 March 1615] but an 1869 note next to the entry claims it is "Fictitious".

He was educated at Witton Grammar School, Northwich. He proceeded to the University of Oxford, and was a fellow of All Souls' from 1639 to 1648. Birkenhead began producing England's first official news-book Mercurius Aulicus in 1643. The principal writer was Peter Heylin but Birkenhead brought satire, slanders and incisive polemics which the parliamentary party found difficult to rebuff.

His loyalty to the royalist party was rewarded on the restoration of the monarchy when he was made licenser of the press and joint editor, with Henry Muddiman, of the new official news-book Mercurius Publicus. His contribution to journalism after the restoration was slight, concentrating more on a political career and being elected MP for Wilton, Wiltshire in June 1661. He was knighted the following year and was a founding member of the Royal Society. In 1664 he was sworn in as a Master of Requests, serving until his death.

Birkenhead was described by John Aubrey in his Brief Lives as "exceedingly confident, witty, not very grateful to his benefactors, would lye damnably. He was of midling stature, great goggli eies, not of a sweet aspect."

He is buried in an unmarked grave near the school door at St Martin-in-the-Fields, Westminster.

== Bibliography ==
- Thomas, Peter W. (1969). Sir John Berkenhead, 1617-1679: A Royalist Career in Politics and Polemics. Oxford: Clarendon Press (OUP).
