= Coranto =

Early informational broadsheets, precursors to newspapers

Page from a coranto from 2 December 1620

Corantos or currantoes were early informational broadsheets, the precursors to modern newspapers. Beginning around the 14th century, a system developed in which a focal point gathered letters containing news and philosophical discussion, bundled them and redistributed them to various correspondents. The banking-house of Fugger (prominent from the late-15th century) became particularly known for its organized system of collecting and routing such letters, whose contents often leaked to outsiders. Regular, printed corantos emerged in 1609 in Europe. These "forerunners of modern newsletters" comprised "single-page collections of news items from foreign journals. They were circulated by the Dutch early in the 17th century", with "English and French translations [...] published in Amsterdam". Early corantos leveraged off the

"extension of the system of 'posts' whereby the imperial couriers were permitted to carry letters for individuals. The beginnings of that extension of the system cannot be documented before the middle of the sixteenth century, and occur first in Austria and Germany. From which it followed that the earliest dated, and numbered, publication of news [occurred] in Central and West Europe."

By the early-17th century the "vernacular term 'coranto' or 'corranto' had already been in use on the Continent for at least two generations, and the word 'corrantier' was the professional designation for a news-writer. 'Coranto' was the usual description applied about this time to any sort of printed news found in England." Each coranto edition might run to five hundred or one thousand copies.

This method of disseminating news continued until the 18th century.

The English-language term "newspaper" first appeared in 1667; prior to that, a variety of terms characterised this genre, including "paper", "newsbook", "pamphlet", "broadsheet", and "coranto".
