= Ditcham =

Hamlet in Hampshire, England

Coordinates: 50.977970°N 0.9499°W

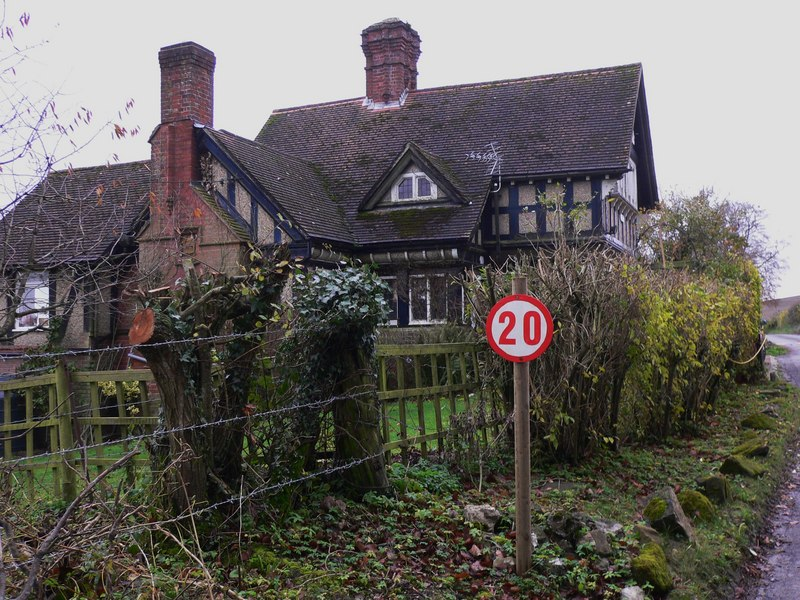
- North Lodge

- Location within Hampshire
- OS grid reference: SU7381820365
- District: East Hampshire
- Shire county: Hampshire
- Region: South East
- Country: England
- Sovereign state: United Kingdom
- Post town: Petersfield
- Postcode district: GU31 5
- Dialling code: 01420
- Police: Hampshire and Isle of Wight
- Fire: Hampshire and Isle of Wight
- Ambulance: South Central

Ditcham is a hamlet in the East Hampshire district of Hampshire, England. The hamlet lies on the Hampshire-West Sussex border. Its nearest town is Petersfield, which lies approximately 3.5 miles (5.9 km) north from the hamlet.

Ditcham is in the Buriton and East Meon ward of East Hampshire Council and the Petersfield Butser division of Hampshire County Council.

== History ==
At the time of the Domesday Book, Ditcham was part of the manor of Mapledurham. At the Reformation, Henry VIII passed the Ditcham estate to Sir William Fitzwilliam, and it later passed to the Cowper and Coles families.

The Coles family built the country house Ditcham Park, which was burned down in 1888 and was subsequently rebuilt by Reginald Blomfield for Lawrence Cave. The Cave family also built the Roman Catholic church of St. Lawrence, in Station Road, Petersfield. Ditcham Park is now the home of Ditcham Park School, an independent day school.
