= East Harting =

Village in West Sussex, England

Coordinates: 50.97225°N 0.86087°W

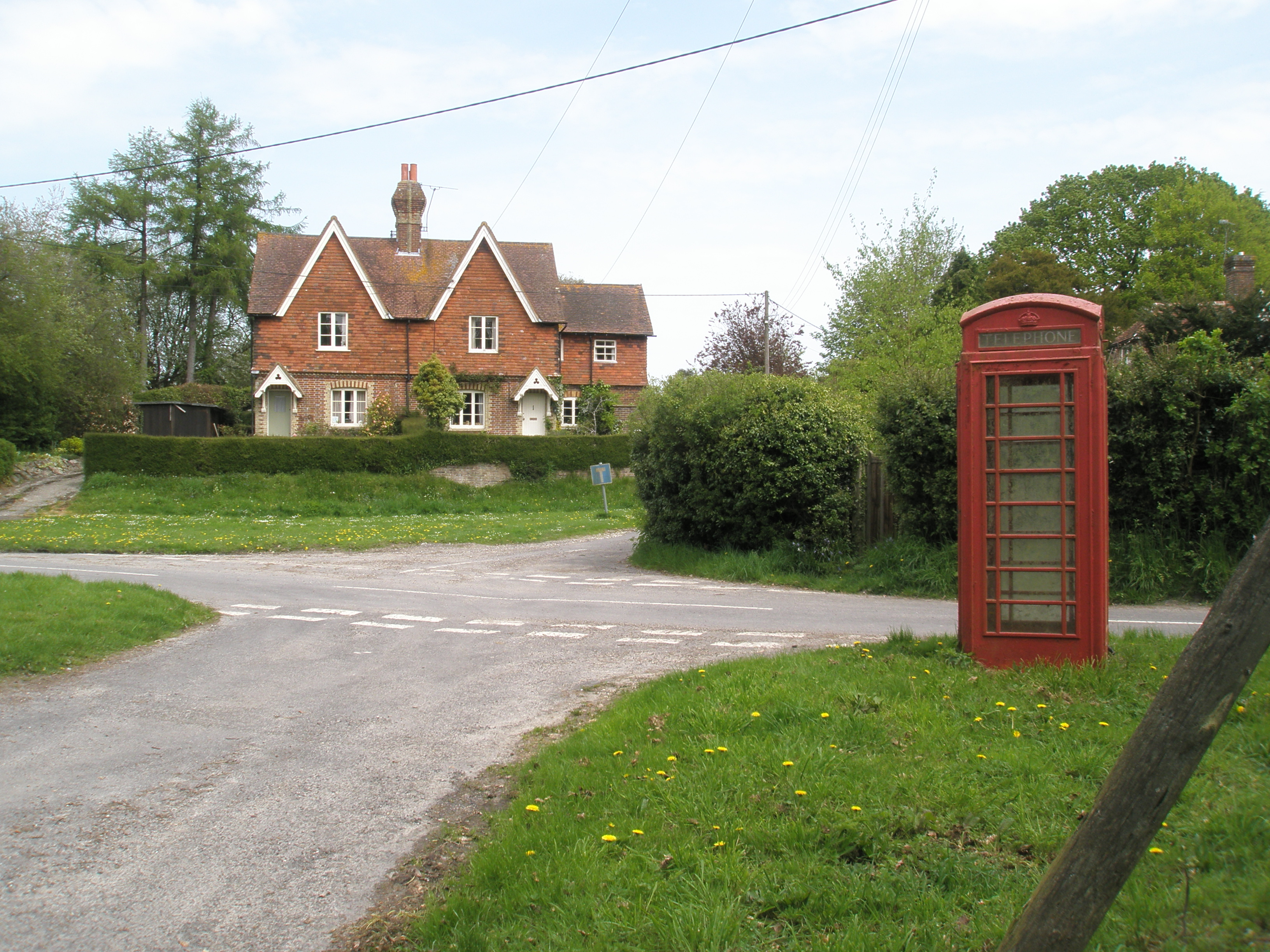

- Location within West Sussex
- OS grid reference: SU800198
- Civil parish: Harting
- District: Chichester
- Shire county: West Sussex
- Region: South East
- Country: England
- Sovereign state: United Kingdom
- Post town: Petersfield
- Postcode district: GU31 5
- Police: Sussex
- Fire: West Sussex
- Ambulance: South East Coast
- UK Parliament: Chichester

East Harting is a hamlet in the Chichester district of West Sussex, England. It lies on the South Harting to Elsted road 4 miles (6.4 km) southeast of Petersfield. At the 2011 Census the population of the hamlet was included in the civil parish of Harting.

East Harting is in the Anglican Parish of South Harting.

== History ==
The hamlet was listed in the Domesday Book included in the large Manor of Harting along with South Harting and West Harting.
