= Folke Dahl =

Swedish librarian (1905–1970)

Folke Dahl (1905–1970) was a Swedish librarian who had a large impact on the study of the early history of newspapers. He was also a pioneering historian of Astrology. His works were published in English.

== Life ==
Born in Stockholm on 8 December 1905, Dahl studied at Uppsala University, graduating licentiate in 1941 and starting work at the city library in Gothenburg the same year. In 1942 he married Kerstin Törnros (born 1918), with whom he had three children, Peter, Svante and Sverker. In 1953 he became head librarian in Gothenburg, and in 1962 he was appointed head librarian at Lund University. He died in 1970.

== Works ==
- King Charles Gustavus of Sweden and the English astrologers William Lilly & John Gadbury (Uppsala, 1937)
- "Short-Title Catalogue of English Corantos and Newsbooks, 1620-1642", Transactions of the Bibliographical Society, ser. 2, vol. 19 (1939), pp. 44–98.
- Amsterdam, earliest newspaper centre of western Europe: New contributions to the history of the first Dutch and French corantos (The Hague, M. Nijhoff, 1939)
- Dutch Corantos, 1618-1650: A Bibliography (Göteborg, O. Isacsons boktryckeri, 1946)
- A Bibliography of English Corantos and Periodical Newspapers, 1620-1642 (London, Bibliographical Society, 1952)
