= Harting Downs =

Protected area in West Sussex, England

Coordinates: 50.955°N 0.862°W

- Site of Special Scientific Interest
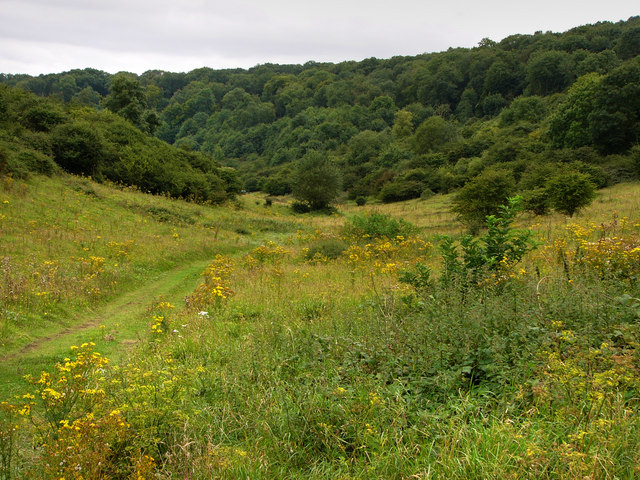
- Location of Harting Downs.
- Area of search: West Sussex
- Grid reference: SU 800 179
- Interest: Biological
- Area: 336.3 hectares (831 acres)
- Notification date: 1987
- Location map: Magic Map

Harting Downs is a 336.3-hectare (831-acre) biological Site of Special Scientific Interest west of Midhurst in West Sussex. It is a Nature Conservation Review site, Grade I and an area of 206.6 hectares (511 acres) is a Local Nature Reserve which is owned and managed by the National Trust.

This site consists of several parallel valleys on the steep slope of the South Downs. Habitats are chalk grassland, which is being invaded by scrub, together with areas of long-established woodland. The site is important for insects, with a nationally rare snail, Helicondonta obvoluta, two uncommon moths, the wood tiger and the maple prominent, and many rove beetles.
