= West Harting =

Hamlet in West Sussex, England

Coordinates: 50.9855°N 0.88389°W

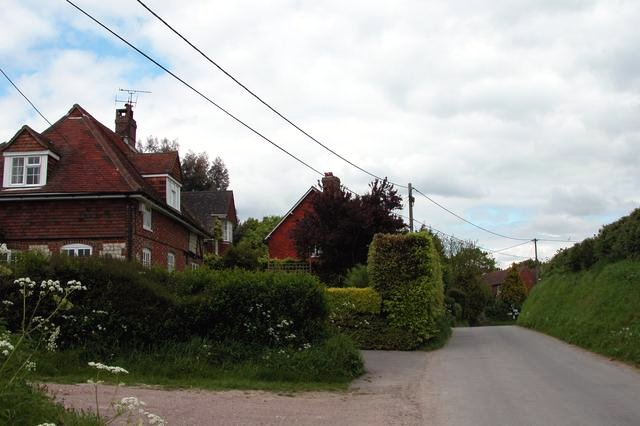
- West Harting

- Location within West Sussex
- Population: 100
- OS grid reference: SU784212
  - London: 48 miles (77 km) NE
- Civil parish: Harting
- District: Chichester
- Shire county: West Sussex
- Region: South East
- Country: England
- Sovereign state: United Kingdom
- Post town: PETERSFIELD
- Postcode district: GU31
- Dialling code: 01730
- Police: Sussex
- Fire: West Sussex
- Ambulance: South East Coast
- UK Parliament: Chichester

West Harting is a hamlet in the Chichester district of West Sussex, England. At the 2011 Census the population of the hamlet was included in the civil parish of Harting. It lies just off the B2146 road 2.4 miles (4 km) southeast of Petersfield and encompasses three additional houses which come under their own hamlet name of Quebec.

All evidence suggests there was originally one main farm in the hamlet, named Manor Farm, which still exists to this day. However, there are several other farms which own the remainder of the land around West Harting in the hamlet's vicinity.

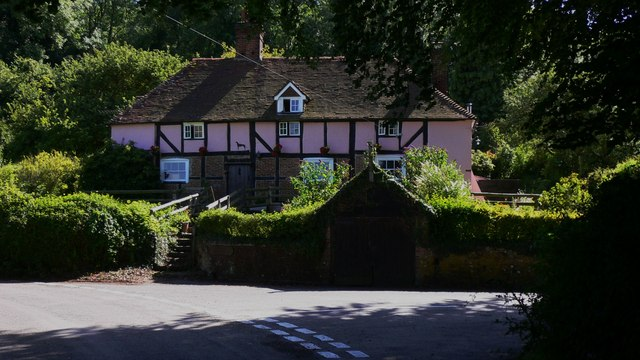
The Old Greyhound

== History ==
The hamlet was listed in the Domesday Book included in the large Manor of Harting along with South Harting and East Harting.
