= South Harting =

Village and parish in West Sussex, England

Coordinates: 50.96983°N 0.88263°W

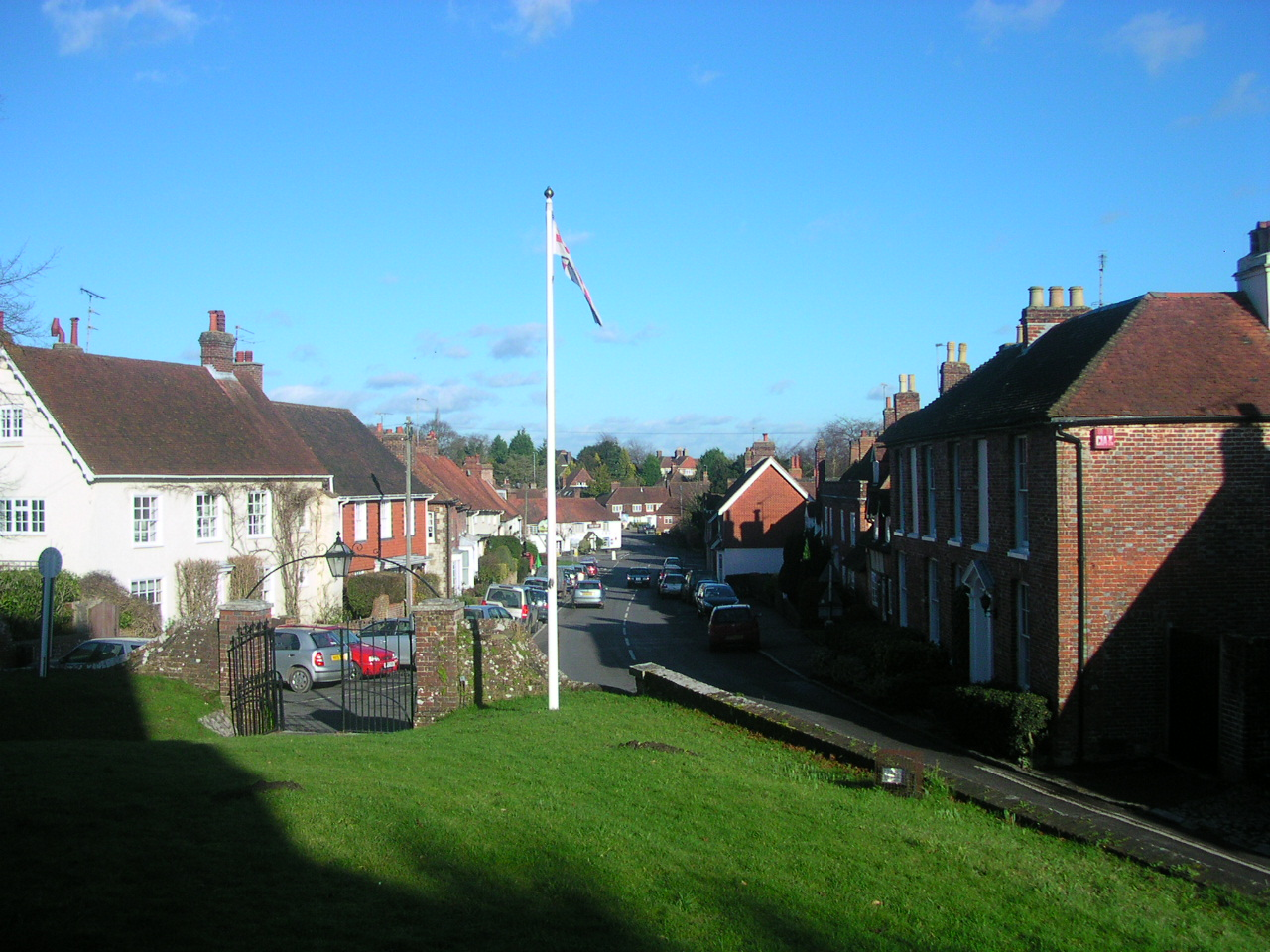
- South Harting seen from the church of St Mary and St Gabriel

- Location within West Sussex
- OS grid reference: SU785195
- Civil parish: Harting
- District: Chichester
- Shire county: West Sussex
- Region: South East
- Country: England
- Sovereign state: United Kingdom
- Post town: PETERSFIELD
- Postcode district: GU31
- Dialling code: 01730
- Police: Sussex
- Fire: West Sussex
- Ambulance: South East Coast
- UK Parliament: Chichester

South Harting is a village within Harting civil parish in the Chichester district of West Sussex, England. It lies on the B2146 road, 4 miles (6.4 km) southeast of Petersfield in Hampshire.

South Harting has two churches, one Anglican and one Congregational, plus a school and a pub. Recorded history dates from Norman times.

The National Trust property Uppark sits high on the South Downs, 1 mile (1.6 km) south of the village on the B2146.

== History ==
South Harting, along with the hamlets of West Harting and East Harting, was listed in the Domesday Book of 1086 as the large Manor of Harting (Hertinges). Listed were 134 villagers, 42 smallholders and 20 slaves, ploughlands, woodland and meadows, and nine mills, a significant settlement at that time, even though the parish included Rogate. Details of subsequent structures and ownership over several centuries are described in A history of the county of Sussex published in 1953.

Apart from three generations of the Earls Montgomery the manor was in the possession of the Crown until 1610, when it was granted to the Caryll family. During the First English Civil War in 1643, there were two engagements fought in the village including the Battle of South Harting fought on the night of 23–24 November 1643, and on 24 November the parish register records that 3 soldiers were buried in the churchyard. South Harting suffered greatly during the English Civil War and was ransacked multiple times by both sides. A Royalist garrison was present in the village from early December 1643 centred around Harting Place, the house of Sir John Caryll who was an ardent Royalist, to protect the lines of communication between Winchester and Oxford, and the newly captured Arundel. A second engagement was fought in South Harting in December 1643.

In 1746 the manor was purchased by the Featherstonhaugh (/ˈfænʃɔː/ FAN-shaw) family, in whose possession it remains.

In 1861 the parish covered 7,832 acres (3,169 ha) and had a population of 1,247.

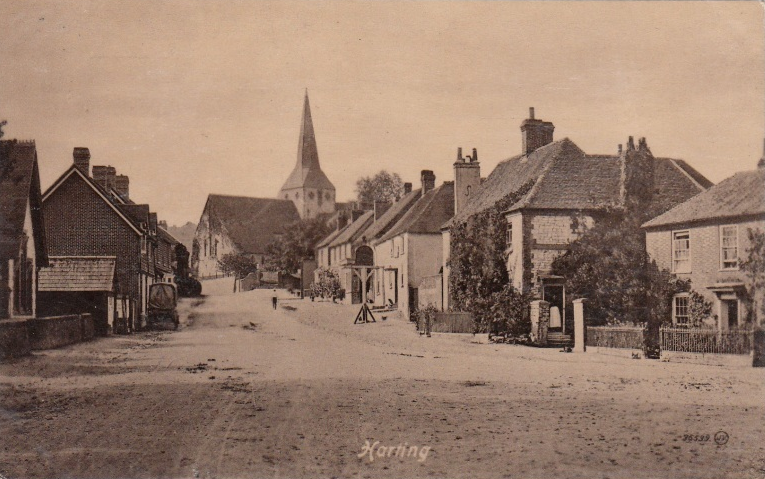
South Harting about 1905, with the White Hart pub on the right of the freestanding sign at centre

South Harting was the subject of the 1956 documentary An English Village, as a quintessential English village nestled at the base of the South Downs, embodying the traditional, rural aspects of English life. Commissioned by the Colonial Office and produced by Anvil Films, the film showcases the village's economy centred around the land and brickworks, highlighting a self-sufficient and neighbourly community. The documentary illustrates how the church, parish council, local school, village shops, and community activities like the Women's Institute contribute to the cohesiveness and smooth running of village life. This portrayal serves not only as a record of the village in the mid-1950s but also as an archival treasure reflecting the timeless values of English village life before modern changes took effect.

== Amenities ==
=== Churches ===
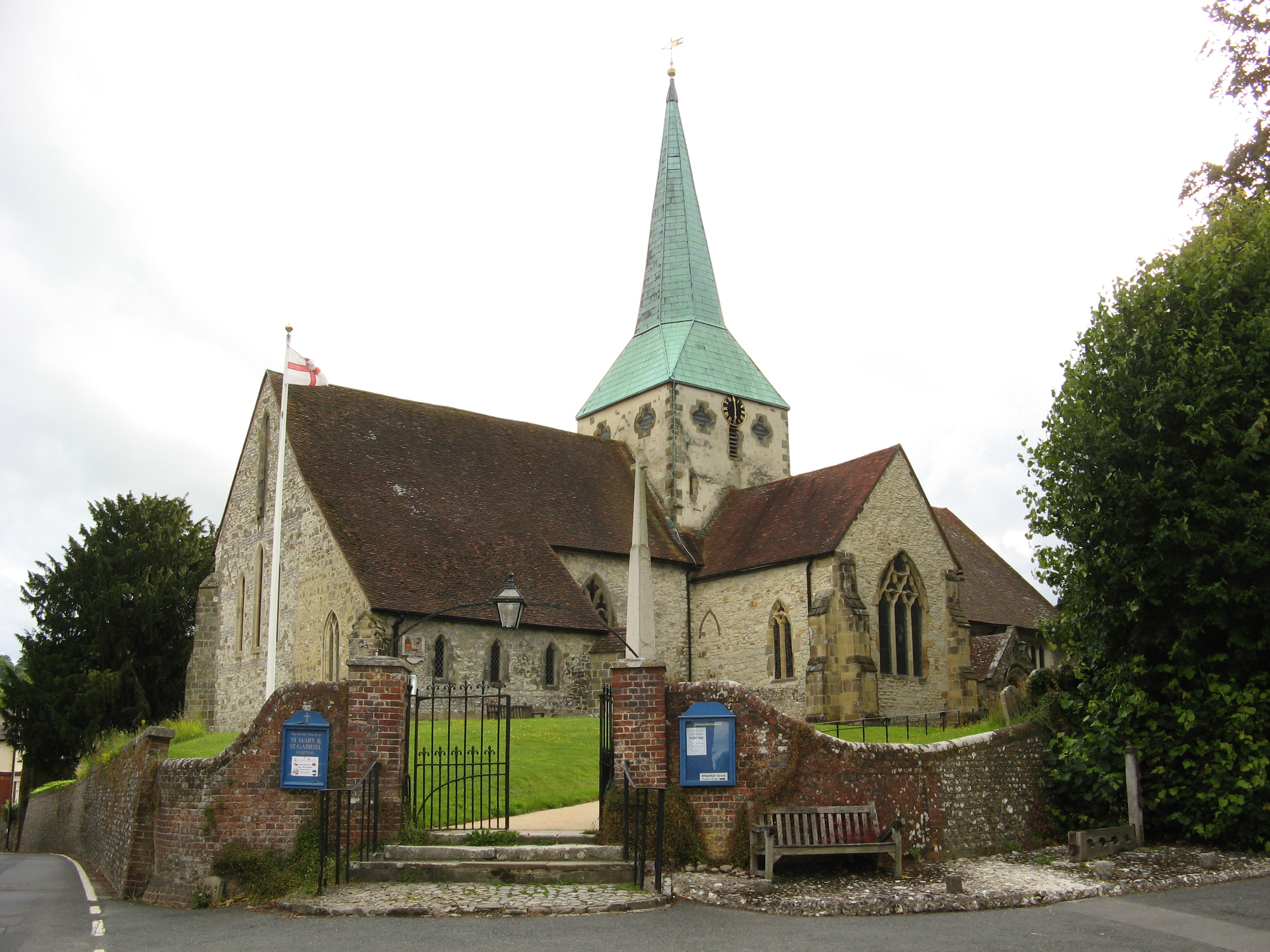
The church of St Mary and St Gabriel

The Anglican parish church of St Mary and St Gabriel is at the southwestern end of the village street, in an elevated position. It has a coppered spire on the tower and a peal of six bells. Major restoration work was carried out in the 1850s, and in 2010 further improvements were made including the building of an attached room for the Sunday school. The church is a Grade I listed building.

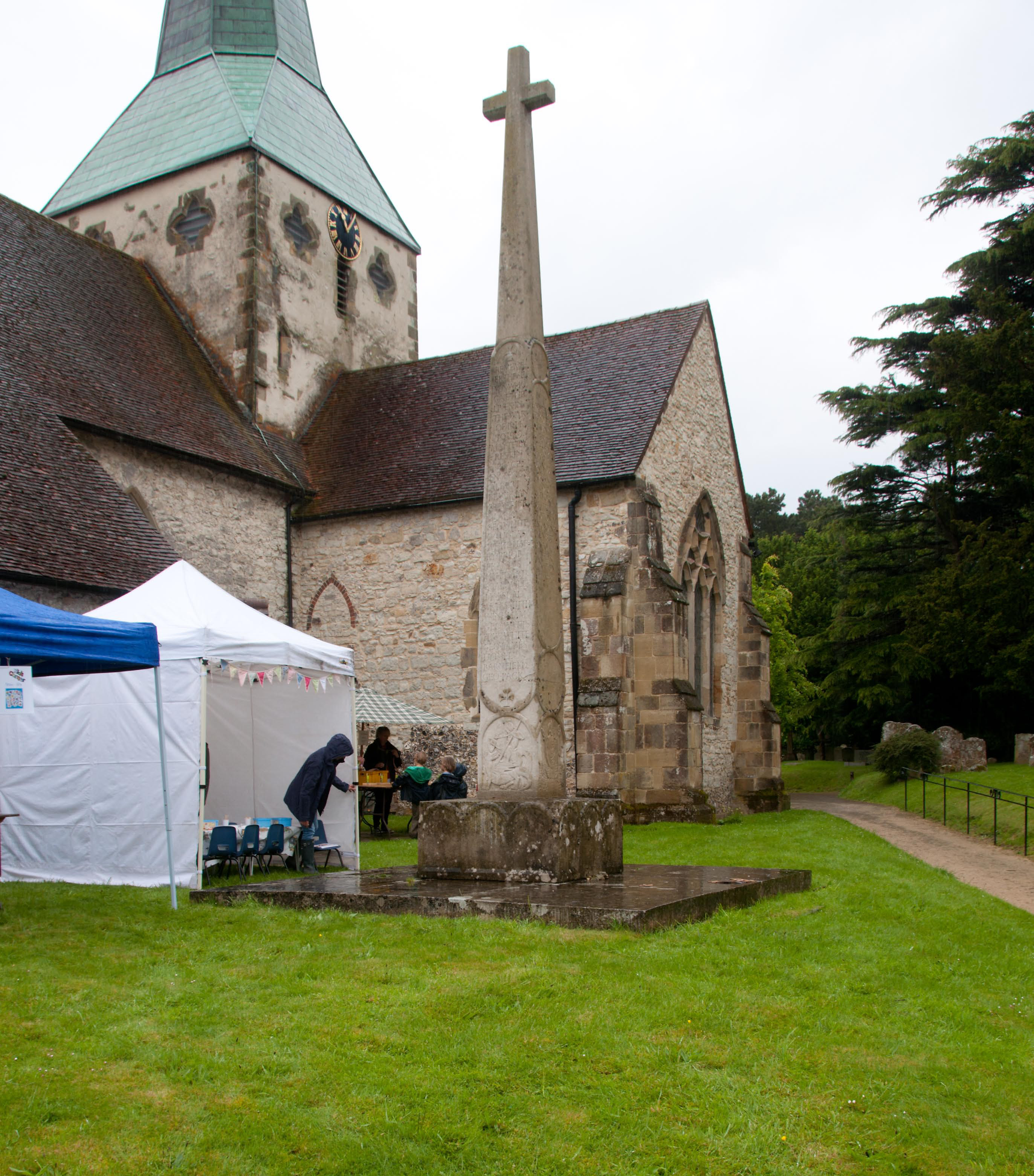
South Harting War Memorial by Eric Gill

In the churchyard is the tall South Harting War Memorial Cross, (1920), a World War I memorial by Eric Gill with the bas relief of St Patrick attributed to Gill being by Hilary Stratton. The memorial is a Grade II* listed structure.

South Harting has a Congregational Church.

=== Education ===
Harting Church of England Primary School takes children from four to eleven years old. Alongside the school is the village hall from which a pre-school group operates.

=== Public houses ===
Harting now has just one pub, The White Hart, a Grade II listed building that includes six bedrooms (and bathrooms). Only forty years ago the village had three pubs. The White Hart is owned and operated by Upham Breweries, a local Hampshire company.

=== Sport ===
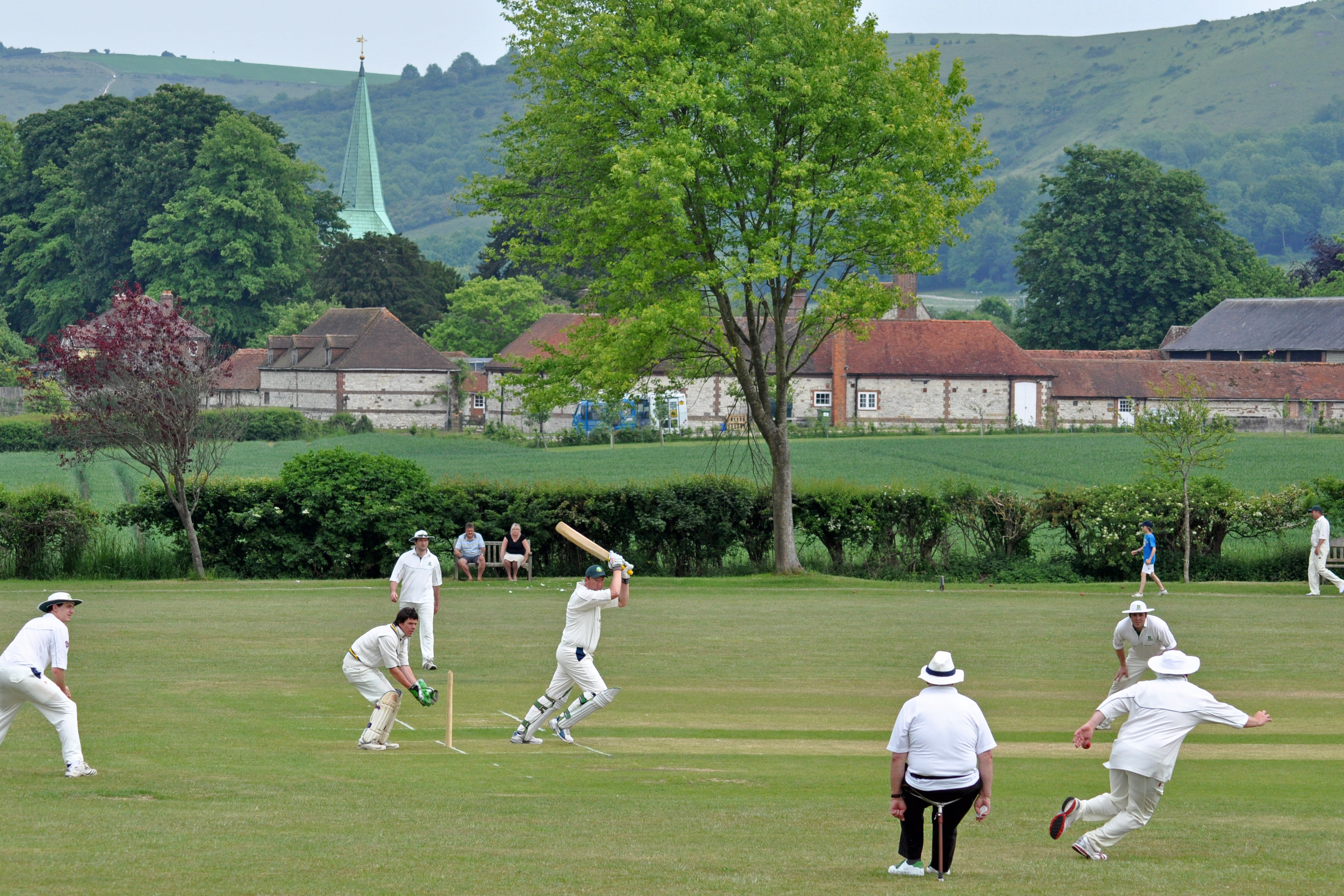
A game at Harting Cricket Club in 2010

In the 1920s Harting Hill (now the B2141 road) was the venue for one of the most important motor hill climbs in the country, with Frazer Nash, Aston Martin and Raymond Mays (Bugatti) participating. The event was founded by Earl Russell in 1905.

Harting Cricket Club serves all the Hartings. Harting have a football club playing in the West Sussex Football League.

== Events ==
Every Whit Monday Harting celebrates the Festivities. Since 1880, the Harting Old Club has had its annual meeting on Whit Monday and the village Festivities started in 1961, replacing a traditional funfair which used to take centre stage in the street. All money raised at the Festivities goes to local groups and charity. In 2022, for that year only, the Festivities were held on Friday 3 June.

== Notable people ==
The painter Theodore Garman worked and painted in the village and is buried in the parish church graveyard. The Victorian writer Anthony Trollope spent the last years of his life in South Harting. He moved here in 1880 and lived at The Grange. His pen, paperknife and letter scales are on display in the parish church. H. G. Wells sometimes lived at Uppark as a young man; his mother was a lady's maid there. Bertrand Russell and his wife Dora founded the experimental Beacon Hill School at Telegraph House, which was their residence in 1927.

Admiral Sir Horace Law lived in South Harting and was a lay preacher at the parish church, where a room is named after him. Television presenter and producer Cliff Michelmore (1919–2016) was a local resident and was buried in the graveyard of the parish church in 2016 next to his wife Jean Metcalfe who died in 2000.

Peggy Guggenheim lived in the village during the 1930s.

== Listed buildings ==
There are 90 listed buildings in the parish, of which 41 (including a telephone kiosk) are in the village of South Harting itself. Most are listed Grade II, but the parish church and Uppark are listed Grade I.
