= Beacon Hill, West Sussex =

Hillfort in West Sussex, England

Coordinates: 50.958937°N 0.851983°W

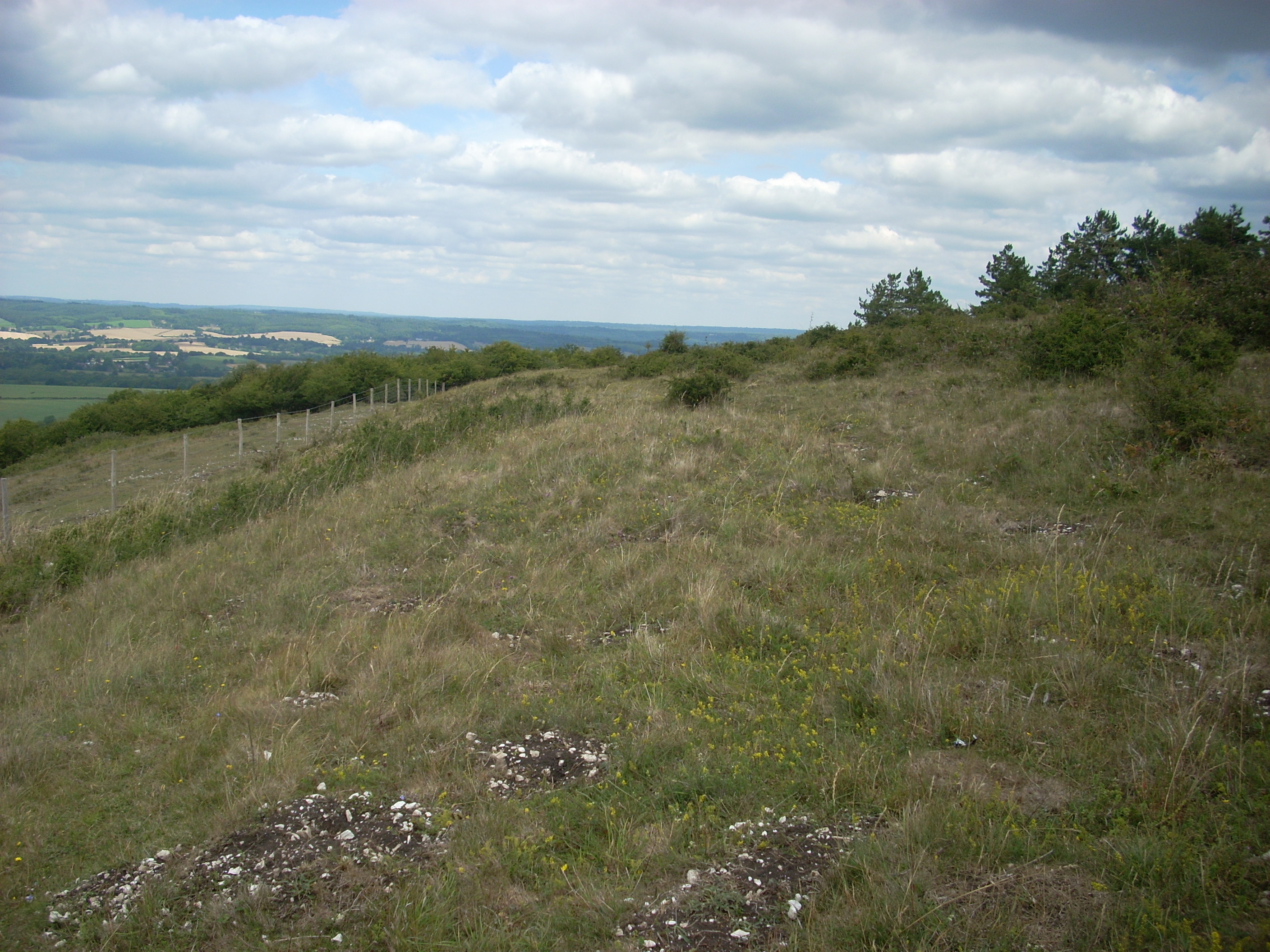
Ditch and rampart of Harting Beacon

Beacon Hill, also known as Harting Beacon, is a hillfort on the South Downs, in the county of West Sussex in southern England. The hillfort is located in the parish of Elsted and Treyford, in Chichester District. It is a Scheduled Ancient Monument with a list entry identification number of 1015915. The hilltop enclosure is dated to the Late Bronze Age, from the 8th to 6th centuries BC. The hillfort defences were renewed during the Late Iron Age.

The fort extends approximately 400 metres (1,300 ft) east-west by approximately 500 metres (1,600 ft) north-south, and covers an area of approximately 10 hectares (1,100,000 sq ft). Archaeological investigations of the hillfort took place from 1948 to 1952, and from 1976 to 1977. Cross dykes on neighbouring hills are considered to be outlying defences associated with the fort. As well as the Bronze Age remains, the area of the fort also includes an Anglo-Saxon burial mound, and the foundations of a late 18th-century telegraph station.

== Description ==
The hillfort is situated on the top of the hill and is defined by a single rampart and a flat-bottomed ditch, which survives as a low bank up to 6 metres (20 ft) wide. The rampart was originally faced with timber, with timber palisades acting as retaining walls on both the inside and the outside. The rampart infill was built with a mixture of soil and chalk, and is best preserved on the south side. On the east and west sides, erosion has reduced the rampart to a scarp, with the ditch silted in to form a terrace. The enclosure is roughly rectangular, with an entrance on the west side. Excavations of the west entrance revealed that a large timber gate was built within the entrance causeway, and uncovered two penannular gold rings (incomplete or unclosed rings). It is possible that there was a second entrance on the northeast side, where a modern track crosses the rampart. Investigation of the interior revealed a general lack of features except for traces a number of small four- and six-posted structures. These are interpreted as having been raised granaries.

== Related monuments ==
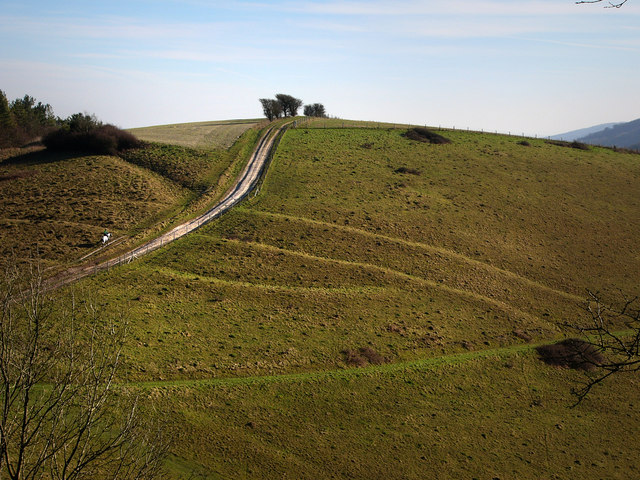
Cross dykes on Pen Hill, immediately to the east of the fort

Within the enclosure is a small bowl barrow which measured approximately 0.6 metres (2.0 ft) high and measures approximately 7.5 metres (25 ft) across. This burial mound has been destroyed by modern ploughing. It stood in the southeastern corner of the fort; excavation in 1976 uncovered a burial, disturbed by earlier antiquarian digging. The burial mound was identified as an Anglo-Saxon hlaew.

Also within the fort enclosure are the remains of a late 18th-century telegraph station. Traces remain in the form of rectangular earthworks and stone, concrete, and brick foundations. The station was a part of the Portsmouth–London semaphore line.

Cross dykes traverse the ridges to the east and west of the Beacon Hill. These are considered to be outlying defences associated with the fort. When Harting Beacon fell into disuse, it may have been replaced by the nearby Iron Age hillfort at Torberry Hill. This conjecture is supported by the known chronology of the two sites.

== Air crash ==
On 19 February 1936 a Handley Page Heyford (K4024) of No. 10 Squadron RAF crashed into the side of Beacon Hill in heavy fog. Three of the Four crew died in the crash.
