= Newsbook =

Small book of print news

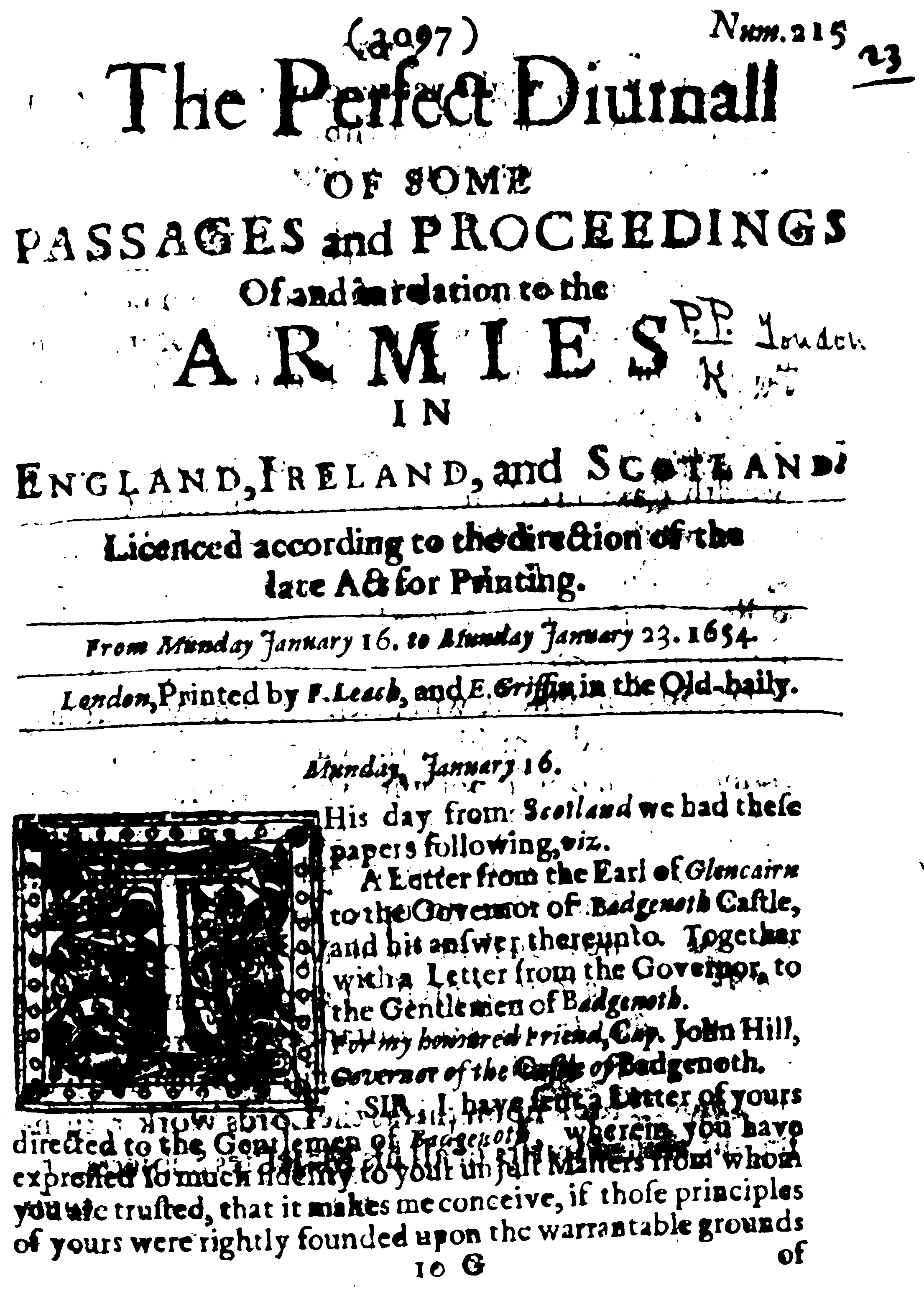
Front cover of the Perfect Diurnall for January 16–23, 1654, with which Gilbert Mabbot was associated.

Newsbooks were 17th century precursors to today's newspapers. Originating in England and Scotland, they are distinct from the earlier news periodicals, known as corantos, which were sourced from continental Europe.

== History ==
The first newsbook was published in November 1641, and in the years 1641-2 there were 171 different editions available. The newsbooks were strongly partisan until Parliament regained control of the press in September 1649.

Newsbooks often contained satirical poems, or otherwise formal reports of major news events.

In his book "The Information Process" (1978), Robert Desmond also calls them newssheets.

== See also ==
- Gilbert Mabbot
