= Midhurst (electoral division) =

Coordinates: 50.99582°N 0.81711°W

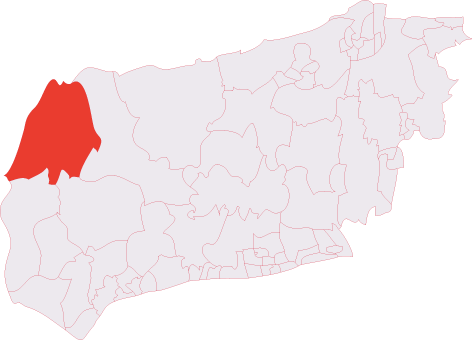
Midhurst
Shown within West Sussex
District:	Chichester
UK Parliament Constituency:	Chichester
Ceremonial county:	West Sussex
Electorate (2009):	8784
County Councillor
Gordon M^{c}Ara (Ind)

Midhurst is an electoral division of West Sussex in the United Kingdom, and returns one member to sit on West Sussex County Council.

== Extent ==
The division is one of the largest in West Sussex and covers the town of Midhurst; and the villages of Bepton, Chithurst, Didling, Elsted, Iping, Milland, Nyewood, Rake, Rogate, South Harting, Stedham, Treyford, Trotton and Woolbeding.

It comprises the following Chichester District wards: Harting Ward, Midhurst Ward, Rogate Ward and the western part of Stedham Ward; and of the following civil parishes: Bepton, Elsted & Treyford, Harting, Linch, Midhurst, Milland, Rogate, Stedham with Iping, Trotton with Chithurst and Woolbeding with Redford.

== Election results ==
=== 2017 Election ===
Results of the election held on 4 May 2017:

Midhurst
Party	Candidate	Votes	%	±%
Liberal Democrats	Kate O'Kelly	1,263	34.7	+27.5
Conservative	Alan Sutton	1,214	33.4	+6.5
Independent	Gordon M^{c}Ara	1,040	28.6	−2.8
Green	Philip Maber	114	3.1	N/A
Majority		49		N/A
Turnout		3,631		
Liberal Democrats gain from Independent		Swing		

=== 2013 Election ===
Results of the election held on 2 May 2013:

Midhurst
Party	Candidate	Votes	%	±%
Independent	Gordon M^{c}Ara	864	31.4	N/A
Conservative	John Cherry	742	26.9	−51.3
UKIP	Pamela Hayton	549	19.9	−1.9
Independent	Margaret Guest	292	10.6	N/A
Liberal Democrats	Bob Green	197	7.2	N/A
Labour	Frances Turner	110	4.0	N/A
Majority		122	4.5	N/A
Turnout		2,754	31.1	+5.6
Independent gain from Conservative		Swing		

=== 2012 By-election ===
Results of the by-election held on 15 November 2012:

Midhurst
Party	Candidate	Votes	%	±%
Conservative	John Cherry	1,410	78.2	+9.8
UKIP	Judith Fowler	392	21.8	N/A
Majority		1,018	56.0	+13.9
Turnout		1,900	21.5	−15.8
Conservative hold		Swing		

=== 2009 Election ===
Results of the election held on 4 June 2009:

Midhurst
Party	Candidate	Votes	%	±%
Conservative	Nola Hendon	2,479	68.4	+29.9
Liberal Democrats	Judith Fowler	952	26.3	−1.7
Labour	Andrew Young	195	5.4	N/A
Majority		1,527	42.1	+32.3
Turnout		3,626	41.3	−26.8
Conservative hold		Swing		

=== 2005 Election ===
Results of the election held on 5 May 2005:

Midhurst
Party	Candidate	Votes	%	±%
Conservative	Ms N J Hendon	2,222	38.5	
Independent	Mr A M Shaxson	1,653	28.7	
Liberal Democrats	Ms J R Fowler	1,612	28.0	
UKIP	Mr P J Cole	280	4.9	
Majority		569	9.8	
Turnout		5,767	68.1	
Conservative win (new seat)				
