= List of demolished places of worship in West Sussex =

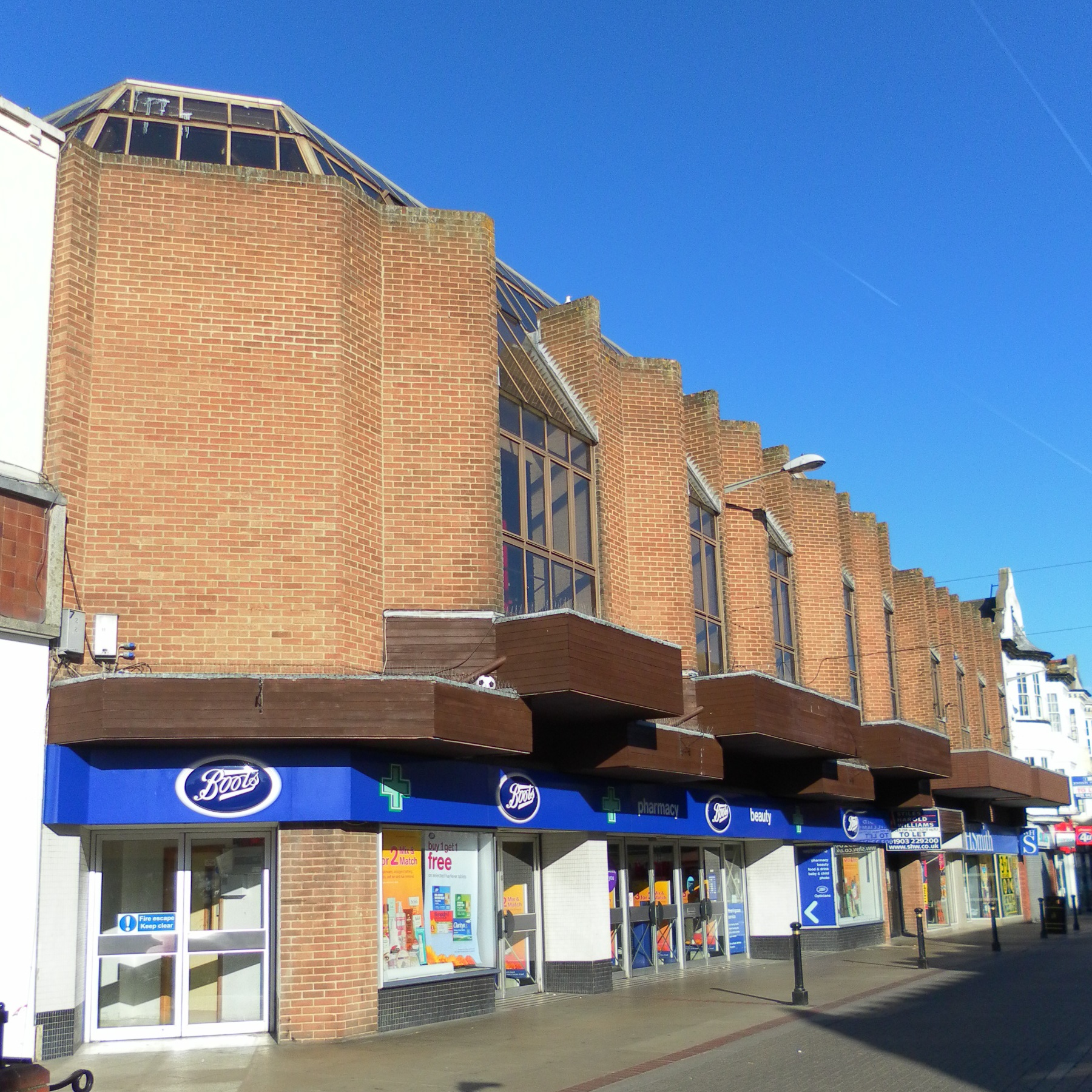
The town-centre site of Bognor Regis's former parish church, St John the Baptist's, has been occupied by shops since the church was demolished in 1972.

In the English county of West Sussex, many former chapels, churches and other places of worship have been demolished without direct replacement. Declining congregations, structural problems, commercial redevelopment, vandalism and many other reasons have contributed to the loss of more than 80 buildings across the county. Major towns such as Bognor Regis, Littlehampton, Worthing and the cathedral city of Chichester have each lost several religious buildings, while former chapels have also been removed in rural hamlets such as Copsale, Iping Marsh and South Mundham.

Details of all places of public worship which have been completely demolished without direct replacement on the same site are recorded here. Private, hospital, school, prison and similar chapels are excluded, as are former churches which are ruinous but still extant—such as the derelict building in Bedham which functioned as the hamlet's church and school. Buildings demolished to allow a new church to be constructed on the same site are also excluded; but if a church was pulled down and a replacement was built on a different site, as at Chichester (St Richard's Church) and Burgess Hill (the Baptist church), details of the old building are given.

Many churches listed here were built during the 19th century and demolished after World War II. Although the government's scheme of statutory listing for buildings of special architectural and historic interest had started in the 1940s, it was—with a few exceptions—not until the late 20th century that churches and chapels of the Victorian era began to be given the protection from demolition or significant alteration which listed status confers. By 1980, nearly 80 of the approximately 600 Victorian places of worship across Sussex as a whole had been lost. Many demolition-threatened buildings survived by "pure chance, combined with the laudable initiative of a few private individuals": processes to preserve former churches that were no longer required, coordinated at a denominational or local level, never developed. Fewer places of worship have been lost since about 1980, as charitable bodies such as the Churches Conservation Trust, Friends of Friendless Churches and Historic Chapels Trust have become more influential and local initiatives have had more success. Nevertheless, some churches of considerable architectural merit have been lost, such as the "most distinguished modern church in Crawley" (the European-influenced St Richard's Church at Three Bridges), St John the Baptist's Church in Bognor Regis ("one of the town's few distinctive buildings") and the substantial St Peter's Church at Treyford, often called the Cathedral of the Downs.

== Demolished places of worship ==
Demolished places of worship
Name	Location	District	Denomination	Completed	Demolished	Present use of site	Notes	Refs
Rocks Lane Baptist Chapel	Balcombe; 51.0571°N 0.1369°W	Mid Sussex	Baptist	1858	c. 1950	Vacant	This low single-storey weatherboarded building was once a shop, but in 1858 it became a Strict Baptist chapel. Members of the chapel at nearby Cuckfield held services in Balcombe in 1845 and 1846 in a private house, and despite opposition from residents a church was founded in October 1851. The building erected at that time soon became a row of cottages, but a preacher from Brighton acquired the Rocks Lane chapel in 1858 and the congregation moved there. The cause failed in either 1914 or 1924, but the building stood for longer. It was only deregistered as a place of worship in 1970.	
Gospel Hall	Billingshurst; 51.0135°N 0.4512°W	Horsham	Plymouth Brethren	1888	1962	Residential	Built for Brethren in 1888, this hall was later used by The Salvation Army and a Baptist congregation before passing to the Roman Catholic Church in 1925. It was rededicated as a church, and served the village until the new St Gabriel's Church was built on another site in 1961–62. It had a porch and roughcast walls. The remains of an arcade can still be seen attached to the outer wall of Marycot, the neighbouring house.	
Gingers Chapel	Billingshurst	Horsham	Congregational	1815	1868		John Croucher, the founder of the Congregational cause in Billingshurst, acquired a former officers' mess building from the Napoleonic Wars era and re-erected it as a chapel in 1815. The octagonal structure was used until 1868, when a new church (now Trinity United Reformed Church) was built elsewhere in the village.	
St Alban's Chapel	Bognor Regis; 50.7870°N 0.6672°W	Arun	Anglican	1793	1857	Parkland	Sir Richard Hotham, the original developer of Bognor, also provided its first Anglican place of worship. In 1793 he built a chapel next to his residence, Bersted Lodge (later called Aldwick Manor). The Duke of St Albans laid the foundation stone. The chapel was granted a licence in 1797 and was used for public services thereafter, but the next owner of the house demolished it soon after buying it.	
St John the Evangelist's Church	Bognor Regis; 50.7824°N 0.6775°W	Arun	Anglican	1821	1891	Car park	The predecessor to St John the Baptist's Church (also now demolished) served as Bognor's parish church between 1873 and 1882. Built speculatively by local man Daniel Wonham, it was a stucco-clad Gothic Revival building with a spacious interior. A tower was built in 1830; this survived the demolition and overlooked The Steyne until 1961, when it too was taken down.	
St John the Baptist's Church	Bognor Regis; 50.7852°N 0.6741°W	Arun	Anglican	1882	1972	Commercial (Boots)	Arthur Blomfield's Early English Gothic Revival church on the main London Road became the town's new parish church upon its completion in 1882. It used flint and red brick and was described as "one of the town's few distinctive buildings", although the Victoria County History of Sussex called it "uninspired". Bognor Regis had another large, central Anglican church (St Wilfrid's), and the Diocese of Chichester declared St John the Baptist's redundant on 8 June 1971.	
St Peter's Church	Bognor Regis; 50.7925°N 0.6907°W	Arun	Anglican	1939	1997	Residential	This combined hall and church building was at the junction of Gravits Lane and Frith Road within the parish of St Margaret's Church, South Bersted. It was dedicated on 23 August 1939. Planning permission for its demolition and the construction of housing on the site was granted in 1997.	
High Street Congregational Church	Bognor Regis; 50.7838°N 0.6731°W	Arun	Congregational	1866	1929	Commercial	The Snewin Brothers of Littlehampton were responsible for this corner-site chapel in Bognor town centre. It was in the Early English Gothic Revival style, principally of flint with some stonework. The entrance was set in a porch. A larger church (now the United Reformed Church) replaced it on another site in 1930.	
Hanover Chapel	Bognor Regis; 50.7849°N 0.6746°W	Arun	Independent	1826	1966	Commercial	This stood on a road (Dorset Gardens) which has also been lost to redevelopment. It was in religious use only until 1869, after which it had many functions including a theatre.	
Wesleyan Methodist Chapel	Bognor Regis; 50.7834°N 0.6738°W	Arun	Methodist	1840	1980	Commercial	This chapel was also in secular use for many years after being replaced by a larger building elsewhere in the town. Built in 1840 in the Classical style with a stuccoed façade, it was used for worship for 85 years, but James Withers' replacement church of 1925 superseded it. Until its demolition it was used as a garage.	
Primitive Methodist Chapel	Bognor Regis; 50.7823°N 0.6783°W	Arun	Methodist	1876	1975	Residential	This Gothic Revival-style chapel with lancet windows occupied one corner of The Steyne, a central square. It was mostly flint with some red brickwork. In 1932 it became a Plymouth Brethren Gospel Hall, and was still used by this group in 1963.	
Burgess Hill Baptist Tabernacle	Burgess Hill; 50.9560°N 0.1327°W	Mid Sussex	Baptist	1894	1970	Commercial (Lidl)	E.J. Hamilton designed this church in 1894. The congregation moved to a new building on Station Road in 1965, when the Tabernacle was deregistered for worship, and The Martlets shopping centre development replaced the old church and its surroundings in 1970. It was a Gothic Revival building of red brick and stone.	
Chichester Congregational Church	Chichester; 50.8345°N 0.7800°W	Chichester	Congregational	1892	1980	Commercial	Another building by E.J. Hamilton, this time in 1892, this was built of ragstone in the Perpendicular Gothic Revival style. One end had an apse. Its marriage registration, granted in October 1892, was cancelled in April 1980.	
Christ Church	Chichester; 50.8338°N 0.7797°W	Chichester	Methodist	1876	1981	Commercial (Christ Church Buildings)	Like the Congregational church, this stood on South Street and was demolished in the 1980s. The two congregations joined and moved into a new church together in 1982. Alexander Lauder built the church in an Italianate Gothic Revival style in 1876 using Portland stone. The façade was gabled and had small towers. Pevsner described its string-courses as "very rude".	
Broyle Road Methodist Chapel	Chichester; 50.8434°N 0.7799°W	Chichester	Methodist	1875	1965	Residential	This chapel was in religious use from 1875 until 1956. It was a flint building with red brick dressings and lancet windows.	
East Walls Methodist Chapel	Chichester; 50.8364°N 0.7722°W	Chichester	Methodist	1840	c. 1910	Commercial	A brick chapel in the Vernacular style, this was opened near the city walls in 1840.	
St Richard's Church	Chichester; 50.8341°N 0.7797°W	Chichester	Roman Catholic	1855	1958	Commercial	Chichester's first Roman Catholic church was replaced by another with the same dedication on a different site upon its demolition in 1958. William Wardell designed the Early English Gothic Revival building in 1855. It was of flint and stone, and the west end of the roof supported a tall bellcote.	
Cinder Hill Mission Church	Cinder Hill, Horsted Keynes	Mid Sussex	Anglican	1919		Vacant	At a cost of £85, and with the support of Rev. F.H.D. Smythe (later an Archdeacon of Lewes), a small hut used as a wartime soldiers' church "on the [Sussex] coast" was moved to the hamlet of Cinder Hill in Horsted Keynes parish in 1919. A pre-existing Sunday school moved in, and the building was used intermittently for worship as well.	
St Paulinus' Church	Cokeham, Sompting; 50.8326°N 0.3359°W	Adur	Roman Catholic	1935	1973	Residential (Hamilton Mews)	A Roman Catholic church for the Sompting area was built in the Upper Cokeham suburb in 1935. Registered for marriages between 1941 and 1971, it closed in 1973 and the site was sold for residential development; worshippers joined the church at nearby Lancing.	
Mar's Hill Chapel	Colgate; 51.0813°N 0.2437°W	Horsham	Baptist	1890	c. 1976	Residential	This chapel was built for Baptists in 1890; before that, Nonconformist worshippers had to travel to Handcross or Horsham. The building was of brick and had a capacity of 100.	
Church of the Holy Nativity	Copsale; 51.0117°N 0.3317°W	Horsham	Anglican	1859	c. 1965	Vacant	This hamlet in the parish of Nuthurst was given a chapel of ease to the parish church in 1859. The dedication was recorded by 1895, and the red-brick Early English-style building was extended in about 1915. It closed and was pulled down in about 1965.	
Station Road Baptist Church	Crawley; 51.1129°N 0.1899°W	Crawley	Baptist	1893	c. 1944	Car park	This chapel, originally ministered by an associate of Charles Spurgeon, was built of red brick and stone, and had arched windows with both round and segmental heads, an apse and a porch. Bomb damage in 1943 resulted in its demolition. A replacement building was erected in the West Green neighbourhood in 1954.	
Bethel Strict Baptist Chapel	Crawley; 51.1133°N 0.1932°W	Crawley	Baptist	1858	2003	Commercial (Asda)	Strict Baptists met in a cottage at Three Bridges from about 1810, and an 80-capacity chapel and burial ground were built on Robinson Road in 1858. Closure came in 1969, but members of the Cuckfield Baptist Church helped reopen it (as Crawley Reformed Baptist Church) in 1971. The building was stuccoed and had an entrance porch with a date-stone.	
Trinity Congregational Church	Crawley; 51.1133°N 0.1920°W	Crawley	Congregational	1863	1962	Commercial (Asda)	The first Congregational chapel on the site, on Robinson Road near the railway station, opened in 1835. This brick Early English-style church replaced it in 1863, and was used until a replacement with the same name was built in the Ifield neighbourhood in 1962.	
St Mary's Church	Duncton; 50.9400°N 0.6361°W	Chichester	Anglican	a. 1548	1876	Vacant	St Mary was originally a chapel of ease to Petworth, but it became a separate parish in 1692. The church was replaced as the parish church by Holy Trinity to the north of the village in 1866 and demolished in 1876.	
New Life Church	Durrington; 50.8354°N 0.4073°W	Worthing	Baptist	1939	2022	Residential	This church acquired its name in 1985 but has its origins in a Free Church of 1912 which became Baptist in 1943. The original chapel, designed by James E. Lund, was superseded by a brick building completed in 1939 to the design of E. Brian Tyler. The church received planning permission for a new, much larger building on the West Durrington estate, and was also granted permission to sell their chapel for demolition and residential replacement.	
St Michael's Church	Durrington; 50.8401°N 0.4031°W	Worthing	Roman Catholic	1938	1966	Residential	Durrington's Roman Catholic parish was constituted in 1927. The first chapel, on Cotswold Road, was erected in 1938. It closed and was demolished when a replacement building was put up on Hayling Rise in 1966.	
St Luke's Church	East Grinstead; 51.1373°N 0.0005°W	Mid Sussex	Anglican	1954	2015	Residential	This opened as the third church in the parish of St Swithun's Church in 1954 and served the Stone Quarry estate in the north of East Grinstead. Architect E.F. Starling's design used brown and yellow brick and featured a large area of glass in one wall. A church hall was integrated into the building. The last service took place on the last Sunday of June 2014, after which the church closed; it was demolished in 2015 with permission for residential redevelopment. Church services transferred to the chapel at Queen Victoria Hospital at first.	
Providence Chapel	East Grinstead; 51.1299°N 0.0167°W	Mid Sussex	Baptist	1894	c. 1967	Car park	This red-brick chapel had bands and dressings of stone on the façade and was in the Early English Gothic Revival style. The cause was established by members of Forest Fold Chapel at Crowborough, and trustee James Cooper funded it. It closed before 1967.	
Rocks Chapel	East Grinstead	Mid Sussex	Congregational	1850			A group of seceders from the Zion Baptist Chapel embraced Congregationalism and founded this chapel. They later opened the larger Moat Chapel nearby, and the building passed to Methodists for a time.	
London Road Methodist Church	East Grinstead; 51.1250°N 0.0104°W	Mid Sussex	Methodist	1881	1937	Commercial	East Grinstead's first Wesleyan Methodist church was built of stone in the Decorated Gothic Revival in 1881 by S.W. Haughton. It was superseded by Trinity Methodist Church nearby.	
Emmanuel Church	East Worthing; 50.8169°N 0.3507°W	Worthing	Anglican	1977	2008	Residential (Emmanuel Court)	Diocesan Architect J.C.L. Iredell's octagonal brick church superseded the original Emmanuel Church (adjacent to the east). This prefabricated building with lancet windows and a bellcote was put up in 1911 by the brother of the vicar of St George's Church, to which Emmanuel Church was a chapel of ease. The original building became the church hall; but both were bought and demolished for a housing development.	
Mission Hall	Elsted Marsh; 50.9795°N 0.8115°W	Chichester	Nondenominational	c. 1884	c. 1971	Residential	This mission hall near Elsted railway station was registered for worship in 1884.	
Dependants' Chapel	Felpham; 50.7954°N 0.6366°W	Arun	Society of Dependants	c. 1898	c. 1939	Car park	This small localised sect erected an iron building on Flansham Lane for their services, which were latterly held on Wednesdays. For a time in the 1930s it was shared with Methodists until they built their permanent church in 1939.	
Primitive Methodist Chapel	Fishbourne; 50.8355°N 0.8103°W	Chichester	Methodist	1872	1971	Residential	Fishbourne's Methodist chapel was a red-brick building with bargeboards and lancet windows. It was demolished for housing.	
Fishersgate Particular Baptist Chapel	Fishersgate; 50.8319°N 0.2178°W	Adur	Baptist	1868	c. 1960	Industrial	This chapel at the end of Chapel Road closed in the 1890s but still stood until the area was redeveloped for industry.	
Congregational Church	Fishersgate; 50.8322°N 0.2193°W	Adur	Congregational	1879	c. 1950	Industrial	A building was put up on the north side of Chapel Road in 1879. Originally non-denominational, it later passed to the Congregational Church, but was superseded by a chapel behind West Street in about 1910. The building remained, though, until industrial development took place in the area.	
Congregational Mission Room	Fishersgate; 50.8327°N 0.2232°W	Adur	Congregational	c. 1910	2002	Vacant	Apparently built to replace the old Congregational church 200 yards (180 m) away, this survived in religious use only until 1947. After that it became a community hall until its demolition.	
Mission Room	Fontwell; 50.8539°N 0.6442°W	Arun	Anglican	1930	p. 1974	Residential	This Anglican mission chapel was served from St Mary's Church at Walberton. It was also used for various social activities and survived until 1974 or later despite falling out of religious use in about 1957.	
Church of the Good Shepherd	Franklands Village, Haywards Heath; 50.9968°N 0.0857°W	Mid Sussex	Anglican	1964	2016	Vacant	This church was designed by William Newman (who also worked on the Church of the Ascension in Haywards Heath) in 1964–65. It had a steep roof with gables which had large areas of glass. The walls were of cedar wood. It was declared redundant in 2003 and remained empty and disused until it was demolished in 2016.	
St John the Baptist's Chapel	Freshfield, Horsted Keynes; 51.0132°N 0.0309°W	Mid Sussex	Anglican	1897	c. 1967	Vacant	Originally known as Freshfield Mission Church, this was built at a cost of £140 on donated land in the hamlet of Freshfield, in the south of the parish of St Giles' Church, Horsted Keynes. The Archdeacon of Lewes dedicated it on 15 November 1897. In 1939 it was said to be "used for occasional services" and a Sunday school.	
Goring and Ferring Free Church	Goring-by-Sea; 50.8150°N 0.4331°W	Worthing	Evangelical	1950	1986	Residential (Oakland Court)	Described as a "plain brick hall", this was erected on Goring Street in 1950 for an Evangelical group aligned to the FIEC. The Fellowship withdrew support for the minister in 1977, resulting in the closure of the church and a High Court action. The building was pulled down, the site was sold for redevelopment and both parties were awarded a share of the proceeds.	
St Wilfrid's Mission Church	Hambrook; 50.8541°N 0.8786°W	Chichester	Anglican	1923	c. 1973	Residential	This was a chapel of ease to St Mary's Church in Chidham. It still stood in 1973, but was later replaced with a new church with the same dedication in the Nutbourne area of Hambrook, a short distance to the south.	
Primitive Methodist Mission Room	Horsham; 51.0694°N 0.3316°W	Horsham	Methodist	1885	2018	Residential	Several Primitive Methodist chapels were founded in the Horsham area in the late 19th century. This brick building on Rushams Road in the northwest of the town dated from 1885; it closed by the early 1920s. It was later acquired by the British Red Cross and was used for the provision of mobility aids, but in August 2016 it was announced that the centre would be closed and the building sold. It was demolished for housing.	
St John the Evangelist's Chapel	Horsham; 51.0636°N 0.3319°W	Horsham	Roman Catholic	1865	c. 1983	Commercial	This replaced Horsham's first Roman Catholic place of worship—a castellated building on Springfield Road which was owned by the Duke of Norfolk. The new Gothic Revival sandstone church, designed by Matthew Ellison Hadfield, was put up in front of it in 1865 on behalf of the Duchess of Norfolk. There was a shingle-covered bellcote above the entrance. Another new church with the same dedication was built opposite in 1923; Hadfield's building closed and was "altered for commercial use" before being demolished.	
St Edward and St Louis Church	Imberhorne, East Grinstead; 51.1274°N 0.0314°W	Mid Sussex	Roman Catholic	1879	1955	Residential	Edward Blount KCB bought the Imberhorne Estate near East Grinstead in 1877. His family were devout Roman Catholics, but the nearest place of worship was the Friary Church in Crawley; so they converted part of Imberhorne House into a chapel for themselves and the public. It was East Grinstead's Catholic parish church for 20 years, and a gallery was built in 1889 to extend the capacity. The last Mass was on 12 June 1955, many fittings were moved to a new church at Forest Row, and the house and chapel were demolished following vandalism. A housing estate occupies the site.	
Church of the Good Shepherd	Iping Marsh; 51.0225°N 0.7943°W	Chichester	Anglican	1878	1986	Vacant	This isolated church near Midhurst was closed in 1977 due to vandalism, although it was not declared redundant until 1 November 1980. Permission for its demolition was granted in 1981, although the graveyard was preserved. Also known as the Knapp Church, it was designed by E.P.L. Brock in the Early English style using black and red brick. There was a bellcote and a porch.	
Kingdom Hall	Lancing; 50.8303°N 0.3265°W	Adur	Jehovah's Witnesses	1960	2011	Residential	This Kingdom Hall was built in 1960 to serve the Lancing Congregation of Jehovah's Witnesses. In 2009, planning permission was granted for the site to be redeveloped with housing, and it has been replaced by a new building in Leconfield Road.	
Brethren Meeting Room	Lancing; 50.8352°N 0.3187°W	Adur	Plymouth Brethren Christian Church	c. 1977	c. 2019	Vacant	Also known as First Avenue Hall, the original building on the site was the Exclusive Brethren community of Lancing's first permanent place of worship. It stood behind First Avenue and was later rebuilt. After the split in the Exclusive Brethren movement in 1970, it went on to be used by the group which became known as the Plymouth Brethren Christian Church.	
St John's Chapel	Littlehampton; 50.8081°N 0.5442°W	Arun	Anglican	1877	1976	Car park	Seceders from St Mary's Church, the town's parish church, established a new place of worship in 1877. William White designed a timber-built Early English Gothic Revival chapel. It remained unconsecrated until its closure in 1948, after which it was a theatre for many years.	
Argyll Hall	Littlehampton; 50.8087°N 0.5445°W	Arun	Plymouth Brethren	c. 1950	2004	Residential (Argyll Hall)	Brethren occupied this building next to the River Arun by 1950, when the congregation was about 160. It went out of religious use after Parkside Evangelical Church was founded elsewhere in the town in 1973. Although the council stated they wanted to demolish Argyll Hall to build a road, this did not happen; the site was eventually cleared in 2004 and new housing (also called Argyll Hall) was put up in its place.	
St Saviour's Free Episcopal Church	Littlehampton; 50.8082°N 0.5407°W	Arun	Reformed Episcopal	1877	1981	Residential (Church House)	Local builders Snewin Brothers erected this chapel in 1877 for the Free Episcopal Church of England to the design of M.E. Habershon and E.P.L. Brock. Their Early English Gothic Revival design used red and yellow brick, flint and stone. In 1896, the Littlehampton Methodist Society paid £860 (equivalent to £125,700 in 2023) for the building, having outgrown their chapel in Terminus Road. At the time it was used as a theatre: the Episcopal congregation had left in 1887. Another £618 was spent on refurbishment and an extension, and an organ was installed in the apse at a cost of £150. A church hall was added in 1915. The chapel closed in 1980 and the congregation moved into the United Reformed Church nearby, which is now styled "United Church".	
Terminus Road Methodist Chapel	Littlehampton; 50.8095°N 0.5451°W	Arun	Methodist	1826	1982	Commercial (Sergeant Pepper's Amusements and Snack Bar)	Organised Methodist worship in the town dates back to 1816, when a Society was formed and services were held in houses. In 1825, it bought a site on Terminus Road for £155.7s.6d. (equivalent to £16,100 in 2023) and built a chapel at a cost of £482.5s.6d. (equivalent to £50,000 in 2023). This opened the following year and was used until 1898, when the congregation moved to the former St Saviour's Church. The Classical-style stuccoed building became a shop; until its demolition a prominent ball-shaped finial could still be seen on top.	
Lodsworth Chapel	Lodsworth; 51.0025°N 0.6824°W	Chichester	Congregational	c. 1865	a. 1962	Garage	This "little Congregational chapel" on the edge of Trussler's Heath in this village between Petworth and Midhurst was erected by a shopkeeper called Mrs Farthing. Registered for marriages between 1865 and 1943, it was demolished by the early 1960s.	
Congregational Temple	Midhurst; 50.9854°N 0.7404°W	Chichester	Congregational	1907	1946	Residential (Russell Court)	This octagonal Free Renaissance Revival-style brick and stone church opened in Midhurst town centre in 1907. It was wrecked by bombing in 1942 and was demolished without replacement. Worshippers entered through a tall portico of stone columns. The roof was topped with a cupola with louvres.	
Independent Chapel	Rogate; 51.0072°N 0.8519°W	Chichester	Congregational	1826		Residential	Opened in 1826 for Independent Christians, this chapel later changed its character to adopt Congregationalism. It stood on School Lane in the hamlet of Rogate.	
First Church of Christ, Scientist, Rustington	Rustington; 50.8111°N 0.5142°W	Arun	Christian Scientist		2007	Residential (Chestnut Cottages)	There was a Christian Scientist presence on The Street by 1962, when their reading room was sold to the Jehovah's Witnesses and converted into a Kingdom Hall. The single-storey church nearby was demolished and the site sold for residential development.	
Rustington Methodist Chapel	Rustington; 50.8103°N 0.5059°W	Arun	Methodist	1877	1952	Road	Founded by Primitive Methodists who had previously worshipped at a cottage, this chapel was originally a smithy. It was turned into an 80-capacity chapel in 1877, and was used until it was bought and pulled down in 1952 to allow the adjacent road to be widened. A large church was built to replace it at nearby Claigmar Road.	
New Road Wesleyan Chapel	Shoreham-by-Sea; 50.8327°N 0.2715°W	Adur	Methodist	1829	c. 1921	Residential	Shoreham's first Wesleyan chapel had a capacity of 200 worshippers. Soon the congregation moved to a new church nearby in 1900, and The Salvation Army re-registered the building as their place of worship. It went out of religious use in or before 1921.	
Primitive Methodist Chapel	Shoreham-by-Sea; 50.8318°N 0.2764°W	Adur	Methodist	1879	1937	Commercial	Primitive Methodism became established in the town in the early 19th century. Meetings were held in various rooms and secular buildings, but in 1879 the group built a chapel near the town hall on High Street. It was used for worship until 1935, and was an Early English Gothic Revival structure with pinnacles and a stuccoed exterior. The marriage registration was cancelled in November 1935.	
Small Dole Baptist Church	Small Dole; 50.9024°N 0.2745°W	Horsham	Baptist	1880	1983	Residential	A red-brick chapel on the main road through Small Dole served the area's Baptists from 1880 until 1977, when it was closed and converted into the village hall. A new hall was built on another site after 1981, and the original building was demolished in 1983.	
Zion Bible Christian Chapel	South Mundham; 50.7923°N 0.7649°W	Chichester	Methodist	1821	1959	Vacant	Founded for Bible Christian Methodists by John Leng near the hamlet of South Mundham, this opened in 1821 and was extended in 1893. It went out of use in 1939.	
Southwater Wesleyan Chapel	Southwater; 51.0326°N 0.3518°W	Horsham	Methodist	1884	c. 1930	Residential	This Methodist church was founded in 1884 and had a capacity of 80. The red-brick building fell out of religious use in 1930.	
All Souls Centre	Southwick; 50.8434°N 0.2318°W	Adur	Anglican	1955	c. 2012	Residential	This combined church and nursery school was built in 1955 on the site of a mission hall linked to the Church Army movement. It was sold, with permission to redevelop the site for housing, in 2008.	
Primitive Methodist Mission Hall	Southwick; 50.8318°N 0.2381°W	Adur	Methodist	1879	c. 1964	Residential	Lock Road (no longer in existence) had a hall which was registered for Primitive Methodist worship between 1879 and 1906 and then for Plymouth Brethren between 1921 and 1964.	
Southwick Wesleyan Methodist Chapel	Southwick; 50.8316°N 0.2365°W	Adur	Methodist	1876	1962	Residential	The present Methodist church in Southwick was built on Southwick Street in 1965 as an extension to a 1930s hall. John Lund's chapel of 1876, closed in 1955, was on Albion Street. It was an Early English Gothic Revival stone building with a capacity of 240, and was linked to the Brighton Circuit.	
Seamen's Institute Mission Hall	Southwick; 50.8315°N 0.2402°W	Adur	Nondenominational	c. 1903	1981	Industrial	This hall was used for Christian worship between 1903 and 1957. The two-storey Institute building, which had a three-window range and paired entrance porches, also had a reading room and other facilities. It later became a public library.	
St Richard of Chichester's Church	Three Bridges; 51.1177°N 0.1743°W	Crawley	Anglican	1954	1994	Residential	Structural problems caused Crawley's "most distinguished modern church" to be demolished after just 40 years. N.F. Cachemaille-Day incorporated continental European and Scandinavian architectural themes into his Modernist brick design of 1952–54, which featured a nave, a central altar and a cubic sanctuary. This had a portico and was topped with a glazed rotunda. A hall adjoined the church. The building was declared redundant from 1 January 1994, and a new St Richard's Church opened on an adjacent site in 1995.	
St Peter's Church	Treyford; 50.9646°N 0.8298°W	Chichester	Anglican	1849	1951	Vacant	Treyford's medieval church was superseded in 1849 by the so-called "Cathedral of the Downs"—Benjamin Ferrey's gigantic flint and stone Decorated Gothic Revival building which was also intended to replace Didling and Elsted's parish churches. Its corner tower was topped with a spire. The church did not thrive and suffered structural problems—the stone used may have been clunch, which weathers badly, and repairs were needed in the 1880s. It was destroyed with explosives in 1951.	
Upper Beeding Mission Hall	Upper Beeding; 50.8686°N 0.2982°W	Horsham	Anglican	c. 1909	c. 1960	Vacant	A tin tabernacle was erected in or before 1909 to serve the houses around the cement works in the south of Upper Beeding parish. The site was sold and the chapel demolished in the 1960s. It had a single bell, which was removed prior to demolition.	
Free Church	West Chiltington Common; 50.9464°N 0.4607°W	Horsham	Congregational	c. 1925	c. 1970	Residential	Originally a mission hall and subsequently registered in December 1925 by Congregationalists, this had its worship registration cancelled on 7 December 1970.	
Sanatan Mandir	West Green; 51.1136°N 0.1961°W	Crawley	Hindu		2019	Residential (Spencers Place)	The Gurjar Hindu Union of Crawley, established in 1968, moved to this small temple and community centre in 1997. The community started building a new temple and community centre at a site in Ifield in 2008, and moved to it upon its completion in 2010.	
St Michael and All Angels Church	West Meads, Aldwick; 50.7891°N 0.7012°W	Arun	Anglican	1968	2015	Residential (Jubilee Terrace)	This church was founded on the West Meads housing estate in 1968, but it fell out of use in 2006. A planning application for its demolition was refused in March 2011—at which time the building was owned by Christ for the Nations, an Evangelical group—but demolition was subsequently authorised and the derelict building was replaced with a terrace of houses in 2015.	
Second Church of Christ, Scientist, Worthing	West Worthing; 50.8175°N 0.3953°W	Worthing	Christian Scientist	1960	2015	Religious (Kingdom Hall)	The Church of Christ, Scientist established a presence in West Worthing in 1938. Its reading room was replaced by a church—a modern brick structure—in 1960 after many years of planning. The congregation from the First Church of Christ, Scientist elsewhere in Worthing joined in 1987 when that church closed. In September 2010 the West Worthing church was also closed; houses were planned for the site in April 2011, but in 2013 a planning application for a Kingdom Hall of Jehovah's Witnesses was approved, and construction took place in 2015. The Second Church of Christ, Scientist's registration for worship was formally cancelled in October 2015.	
Cuckfield Methodist Chapel	Whiteman's Green; 51.0134°N 0.1413°W	Mid Sussex	Methodist	c. 1886	c. 1960	Residential	This chapel, on the London Road north of Cuckfield village, served the area's Wesleyan Methodist population. It was one of six places of worship in the parish (three Anglican, one Baptist and one Congregationalist). The building was sold in the early 1950s.	
Wick Methodist Chapel	Wick; 50.8191°N 0.5443°W	Arun	Methodist	1876	1968	Commercial (Wick Parade)	This was built in the northern suburbs of Littlehampton in 1876 and was originally Primitive Methodist. After the Methodist Union of 1932, it was linked to the formerly Wesleyan Littlehampton Methodist Church in New Road. The Gothic Revival building had flint and brick walls.	
Wyndham Mission Room	Wineham; 50.9676°N 0.2418°W	Horsham	Anglican	1891	c. 1947	Residential	Wineham (usually called Wyndham until the 20th century) is a village in the east of Shermanbury parish, distant from its church. An iron-walled chapel of ease was erected near the Royal Oak inn on Wineham Lane in 1891. It was used for worship until around 1938 and still stood for some years afterwards.	
Church of the Good Shepherd	Worthing; 50.8159°N 0.3709°W	Worthing	Anglican	1906	1973	Charitable organisation (Methold House)	F.C. Cook's Early English Gothic Revival-style chapel of ease to the nearby St Paul's Church opened in 1906 and fell out of use in 1963. It had stone-dressed stuccoed walls. The Worthing Area Guild for Voluntary Services, a charity with wide-ranging activities, has been based in the vicinity since 1933; in 1975, after the church was demolished, they built a new headquarters on the site.	
Brighton Road Meeting Room	Worthing; 50.8123°N 0.3645°W	Worthing	Baptist	1886	1965	Commercial (The Bike Store)	Used by Calvinistic Baptists, this stood at 65 Brighton Road.	
Gospel Hall	Worthing; 50.8123°N 0.3702°W	Worthing	Plymouth Brethren	1887	c. 1918	Commercial	This was registered as a Brethren meeting hall in 1892, five years after its construction. It stood at 12 Chapel Road for about 30 years, but was demolished after its closure in 1918.	
Independent Congregational Chapel	Worthing; 50.8104°N 0.3729°W	Worthing	Congregational	1839	1978	Commercial (Boots)	Local architect Charles Hide rebuilt the Independent chapel of 1804 on Montague Street which had been Worthing's first place of worship, pre-dating even St Paul's Anglican Church. The new building was used by Congregationalists led by Rev. George E. Rees. The Christian Literary Institute was opened in 1862 next to the church, but when a new Congregational church was built on Shelley Road in 1898 the chapel fell out of religious use: it was converted into a hall and, later, shops. A Boots store now occupies the site.	
Evangelical Protestants' Hall	Worthing; 50.8219°N 0.3688°W	Worthing	Evangelical	1906	1969	Commercial (Guildbourne Centre)	James E. Lund, who also designed Worthing Tabernacle and West Worthing Evangelical Free Church, was responsible for the free-style Queen Anne Revival chapel on Chatsworth Road which was used by displaced members of the former New Street Chapel. Its pastor served for 51 years, but in 1957 it was sold and became a factory. Its marriage registration, which dated from 1909, was cancelled in May of that year.	
Primitive Methodist Chapel	Worthing; 50.8159°N 0.3723°W	Worthing	Methodist	1892	1958	Commercial (Worthing Bedding Centre)	A tin tabernacle of 1880 at the junction of Wenban Road and Chapel Road was later replaced by R.S. Hyde's Decorated Gothic Revival church of red brick, flint and stone. Architectural features included a flèche and an apse. It closed in 1955 or 1956.	

== All Saints Church, Baldwins Hill ==
Between 1887 and the 1960s, a church dedicated to All Saints stood at a location (51.1382°N 0.0202°W) which is now within West Sussex but which was part of neighbouring Surrey at the time. (Note: The county boundary was changed by the Local Government Act 1972. Ordnance Survey maps before this date show the boundary running south of Felbridge Lane, the road on which the church stood.) Sidney Poole Lowell of Baldwins, a large house north of East Grinstead, paid for the church to be built near his house because of the distance from St Swithun's parish church. St Mary the Virgin's church was later built nearby, but the older building—originally dedicated to St Matthias—still stood. Because it was just over the county border in Surrey, it was part of the Anglican Diocese of Southwark and was not linked to the new church. This situation was changed in 1952, when the renamed All Saints Church was transferred to the Diocese of Chichester and became a second church within St Mary the Virgin's parish. Nine years later, it was closed because of structural defects; the church committee concluded it "no longer serv[ed] any useful purpose".

== Gallery ==
Pictures of demolished places of worship

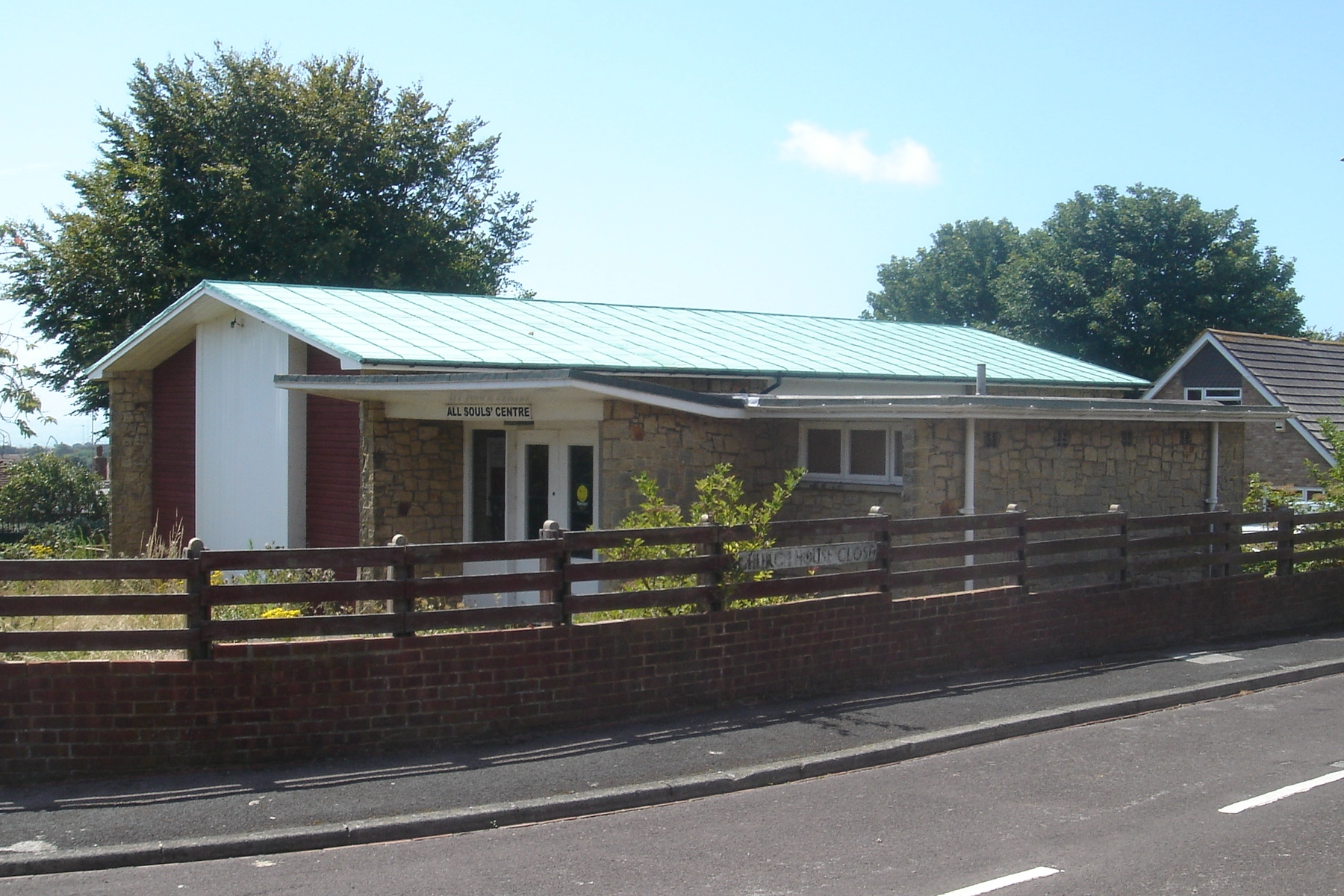
All Souls Centre in Southwick was a multipurpose building dating from 1955.

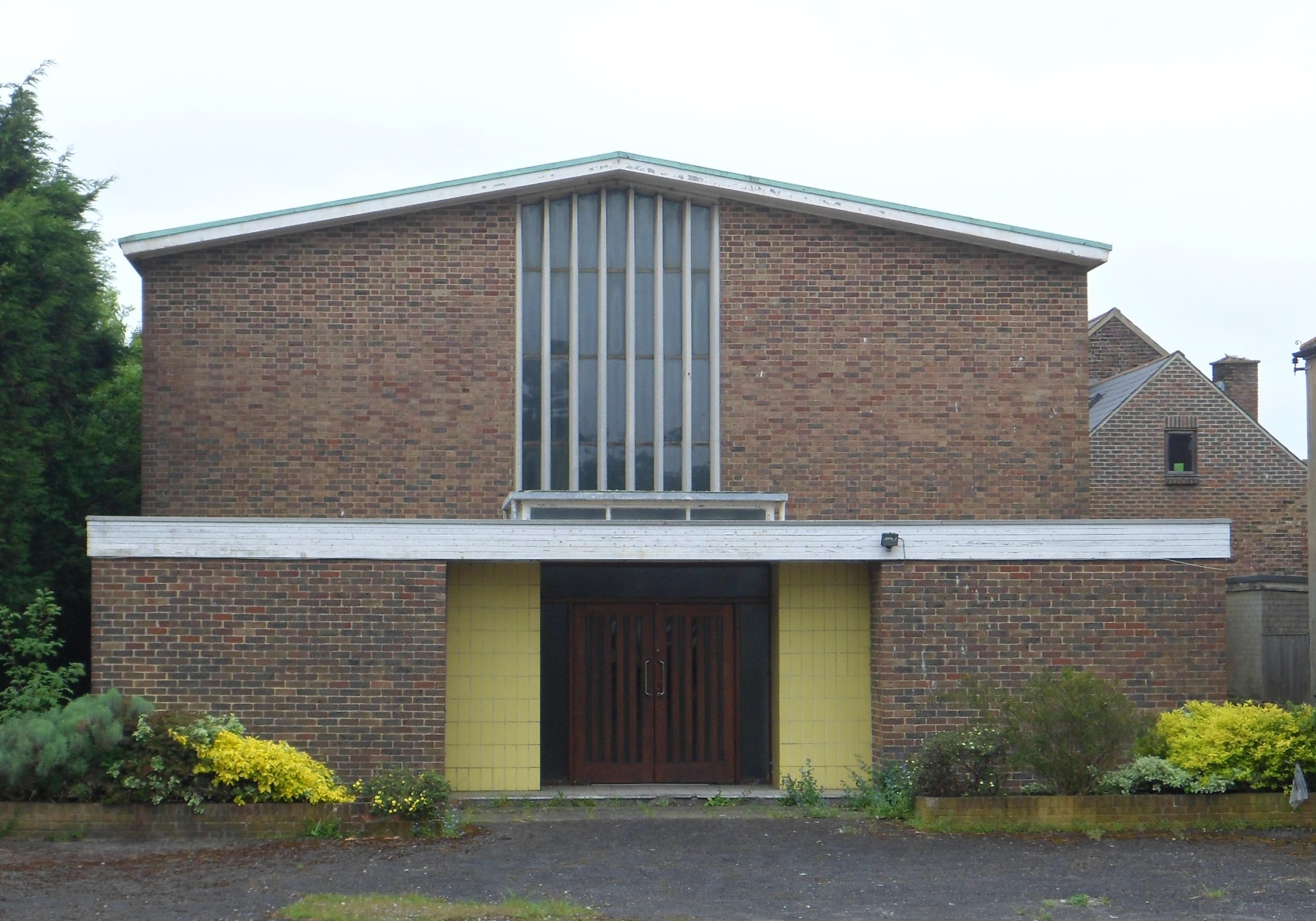
The Second Church of Christ, Scientist, Worthing opened in 1960.

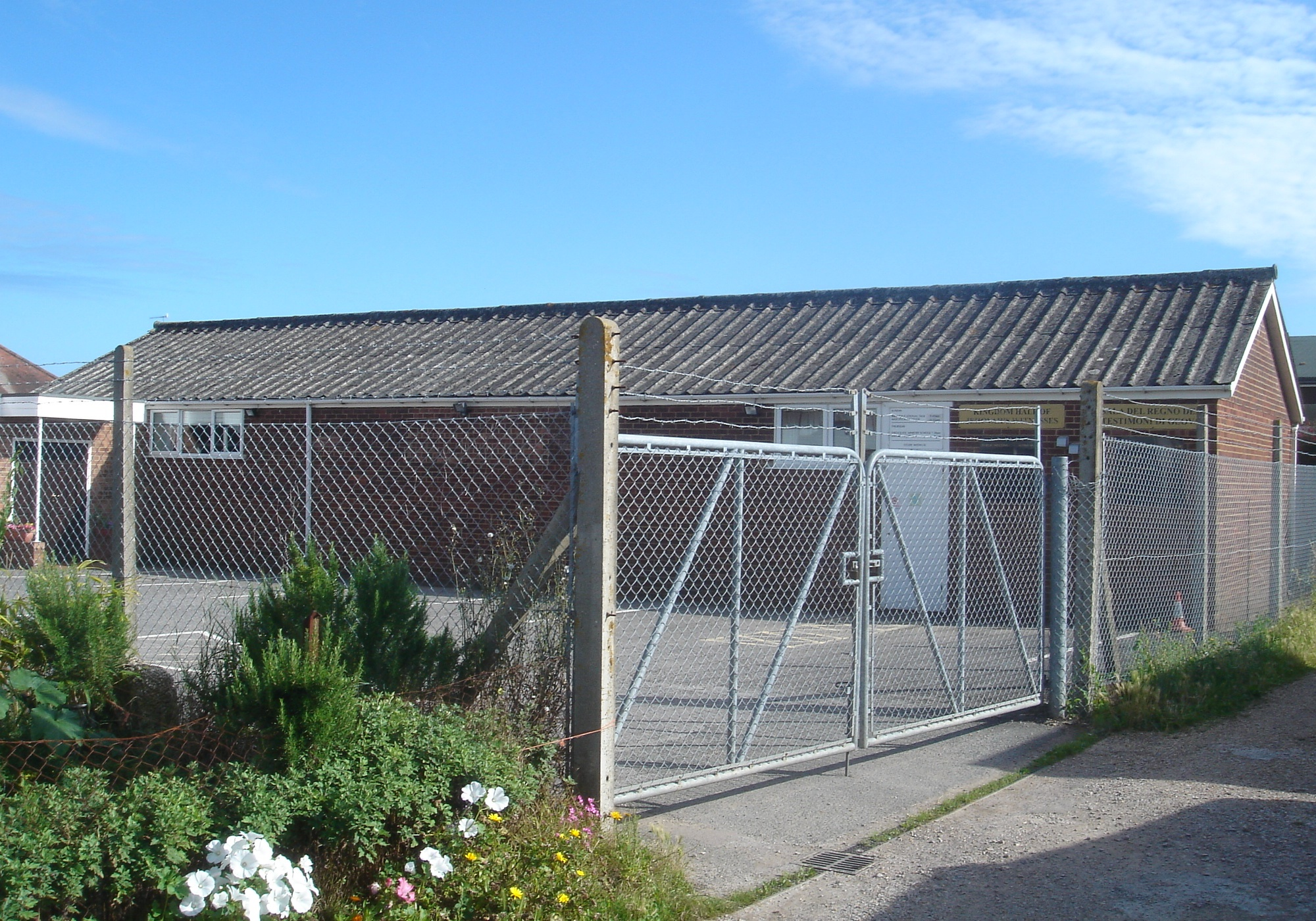
Lancing's original Kingdom Hall was in use between 1960 and 2011.

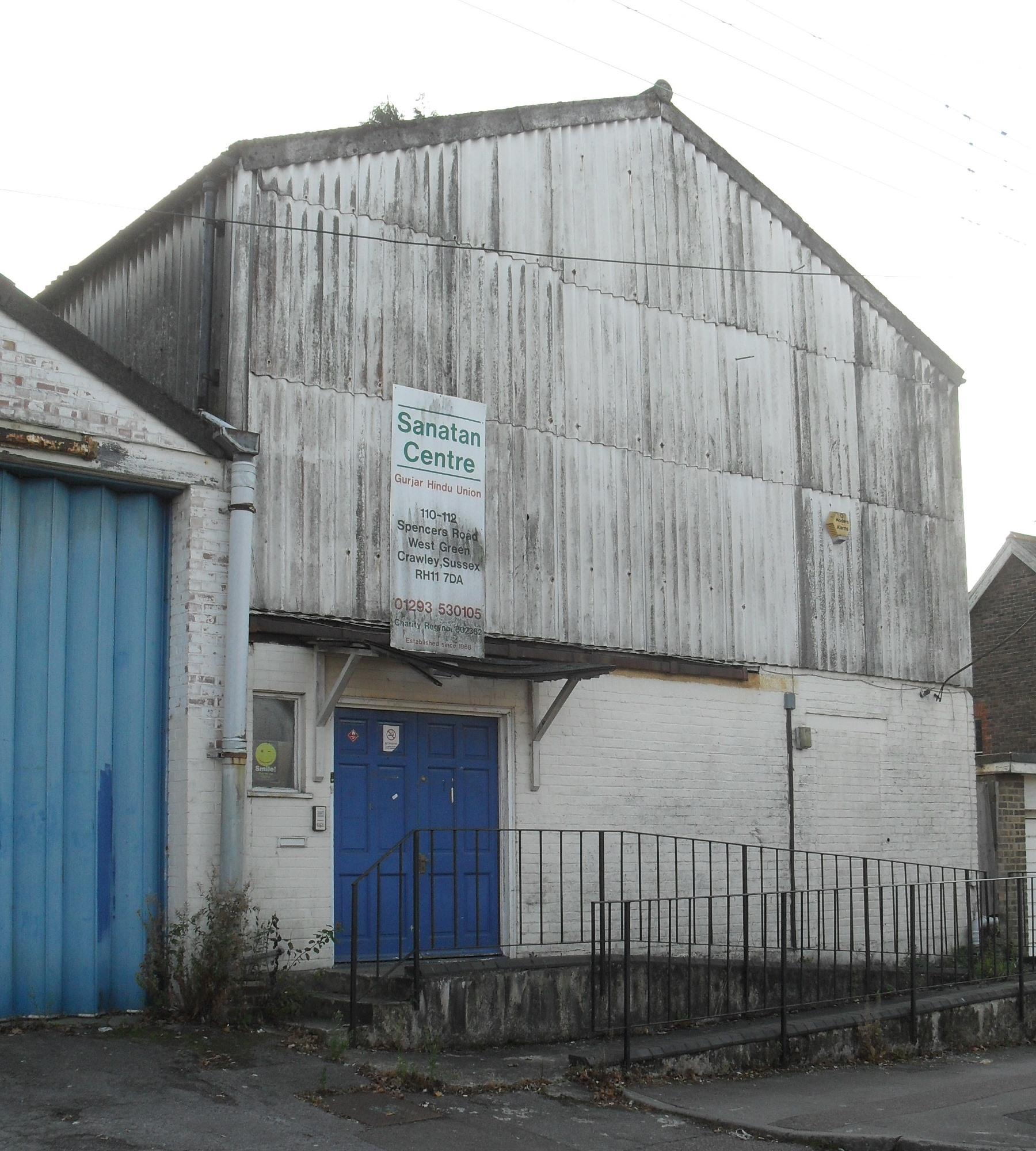
This building in the West Green area of Crawley was used as a Hindu temple until 2010.

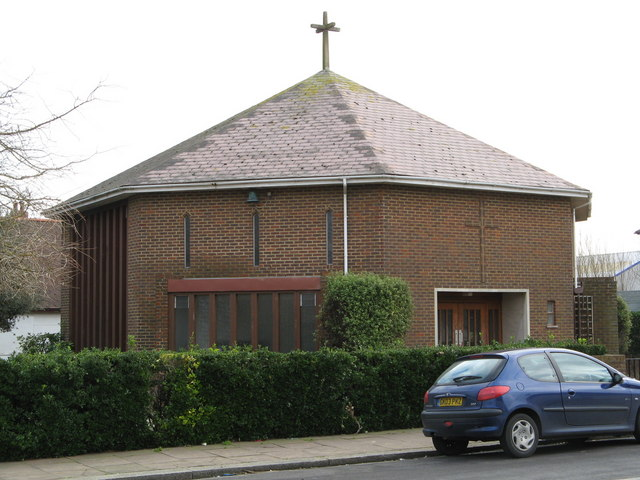
Emmanuel Church in Worthing opened in 1977 and was demolished in 2008.

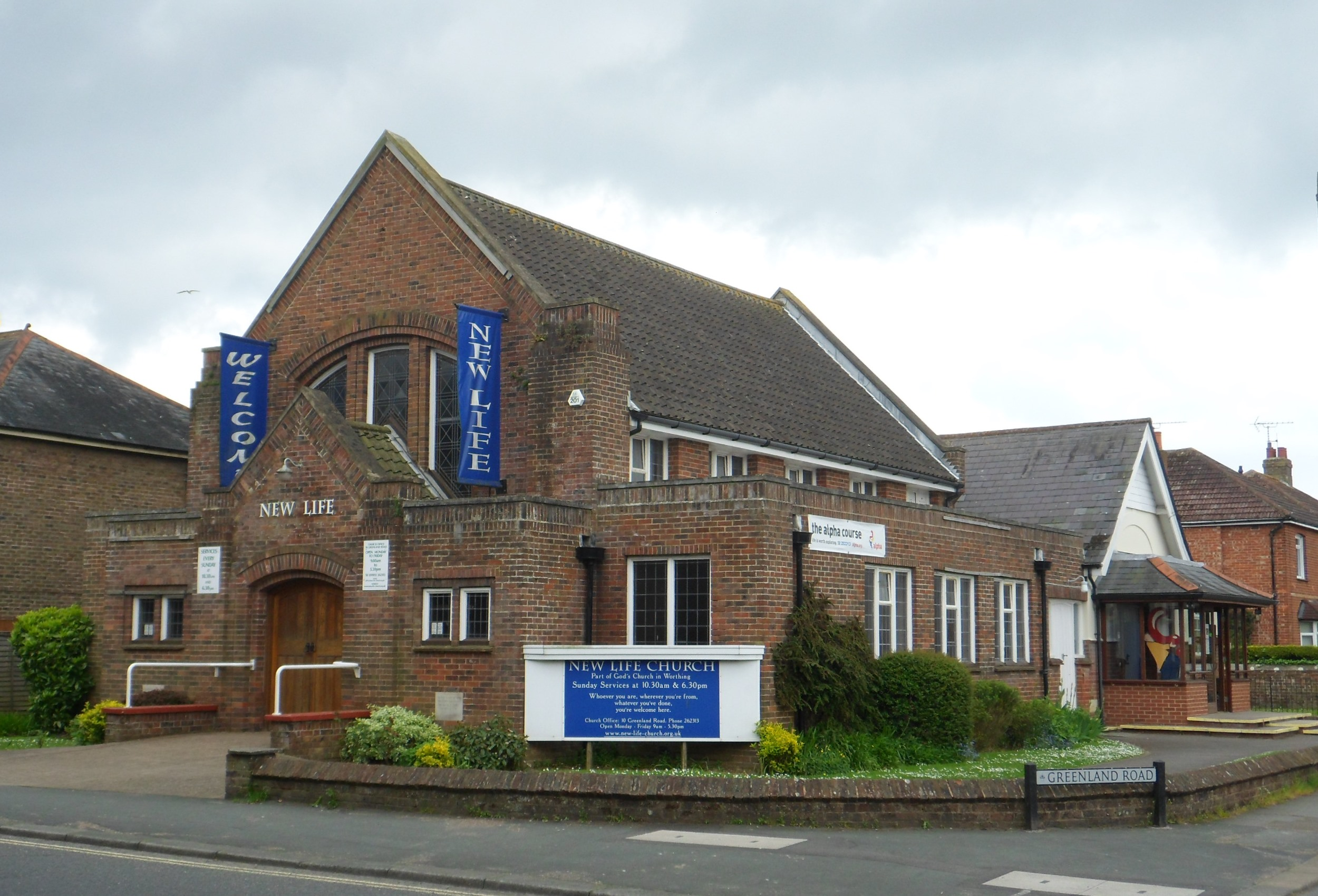
New Life Church at Durrington was demolished in 2022. It is moving to a new site.

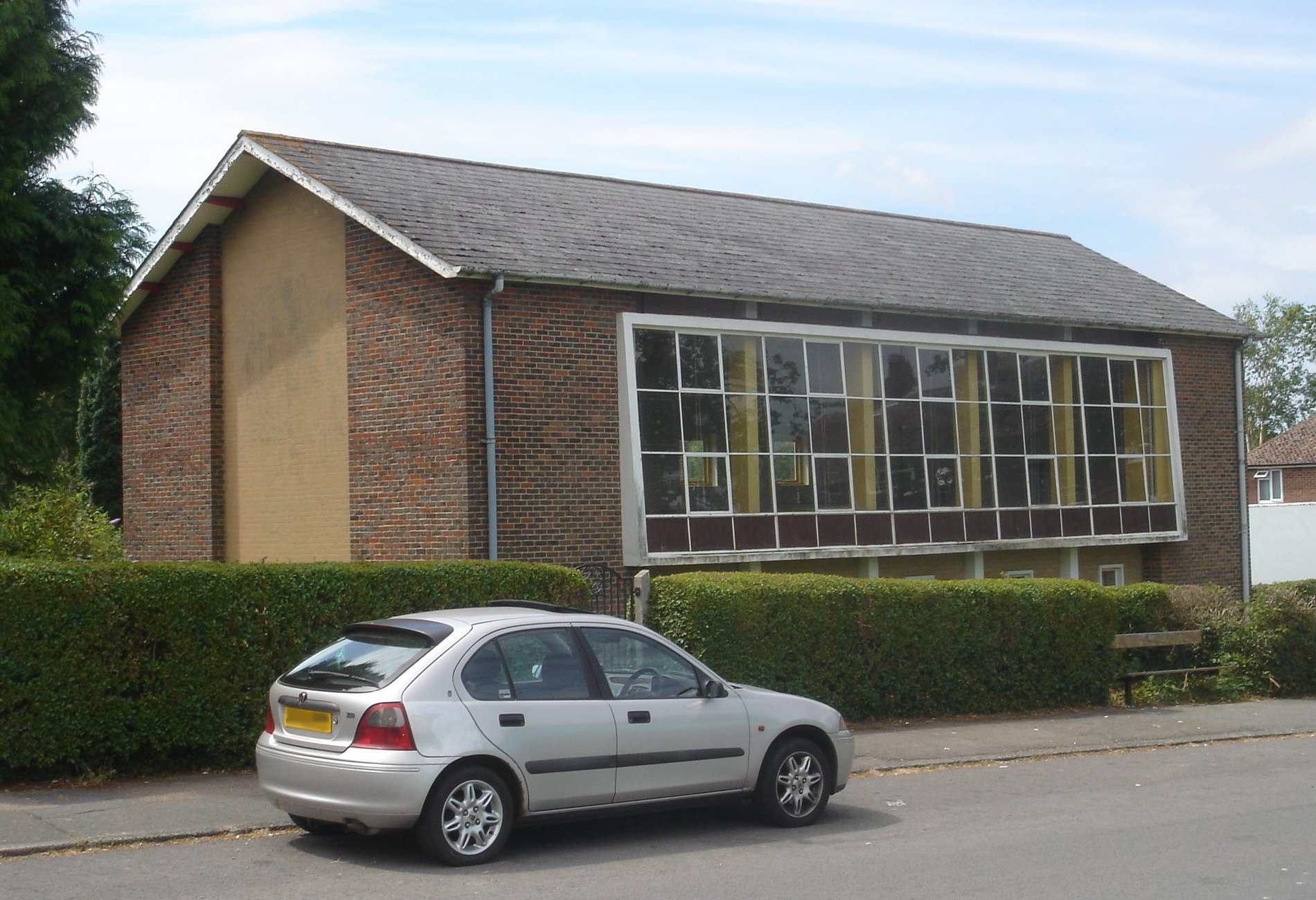
St Luke's Church served the Stone Quarry area of East Grinstead between 1954 and 2014. It was demolished the following year.

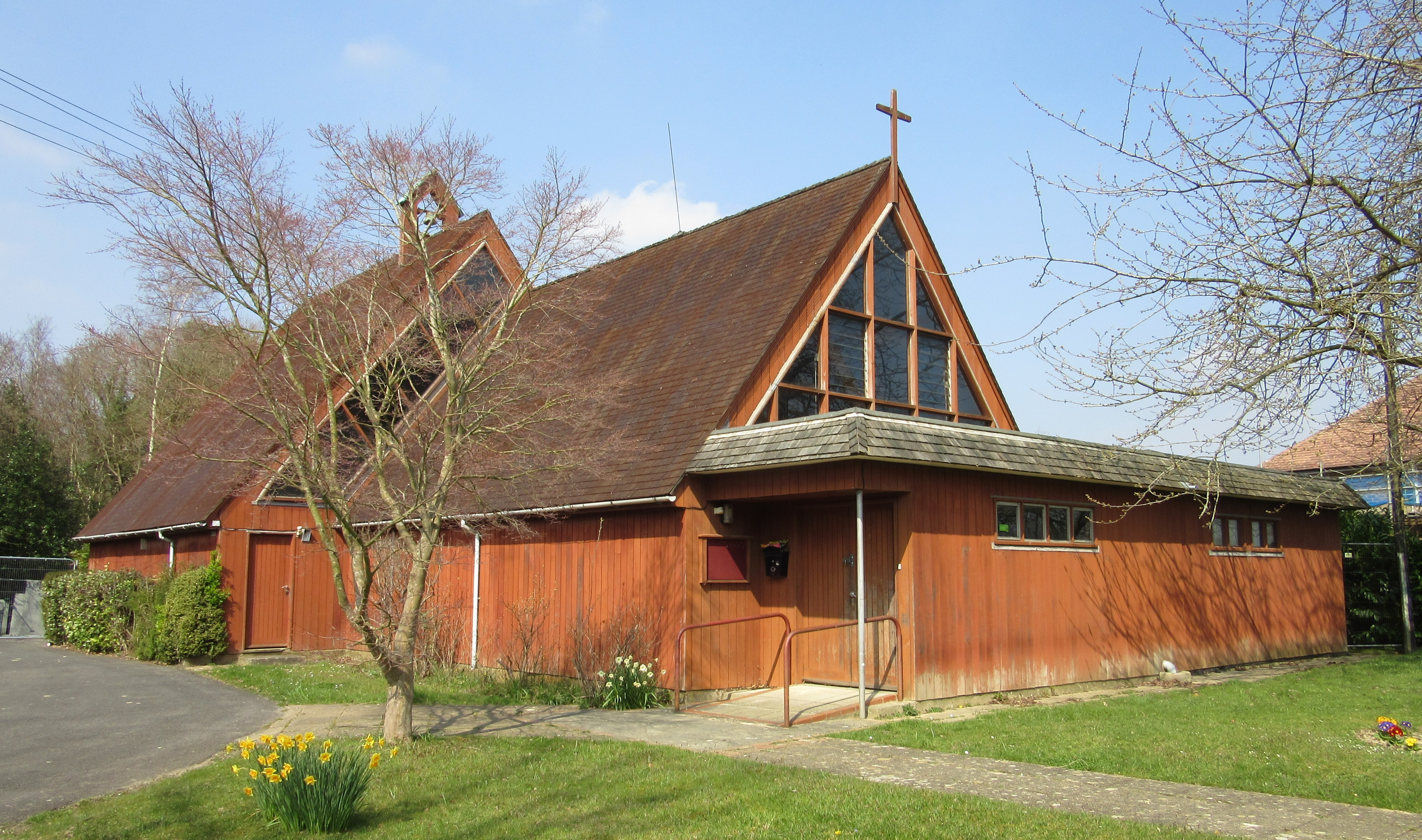
The Church of the Good Shepherd, Franklands Village, stood between 1964 and 2016.

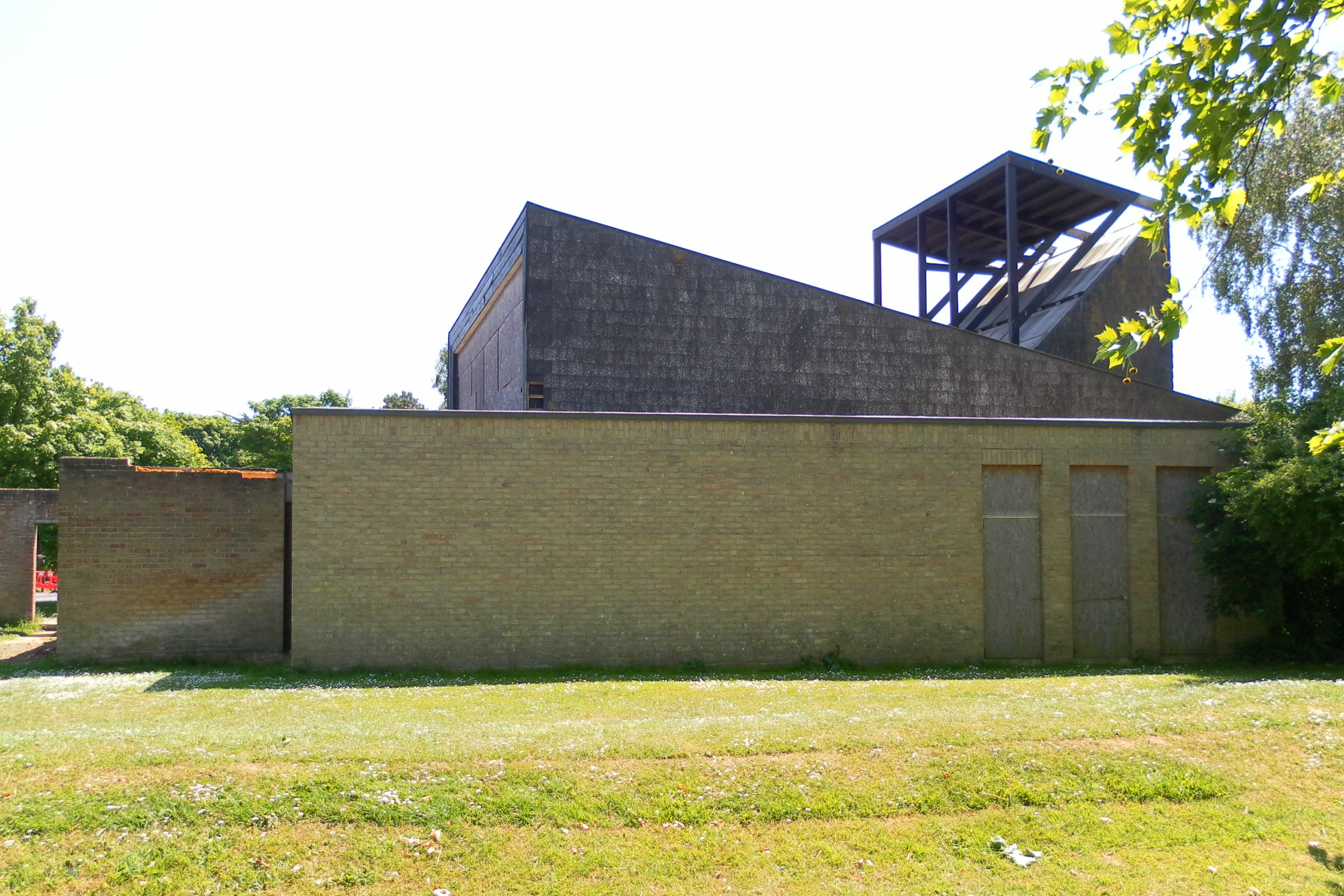
St Michael and All Angels Church in the West Meads area of Aldwick was built in 1968.

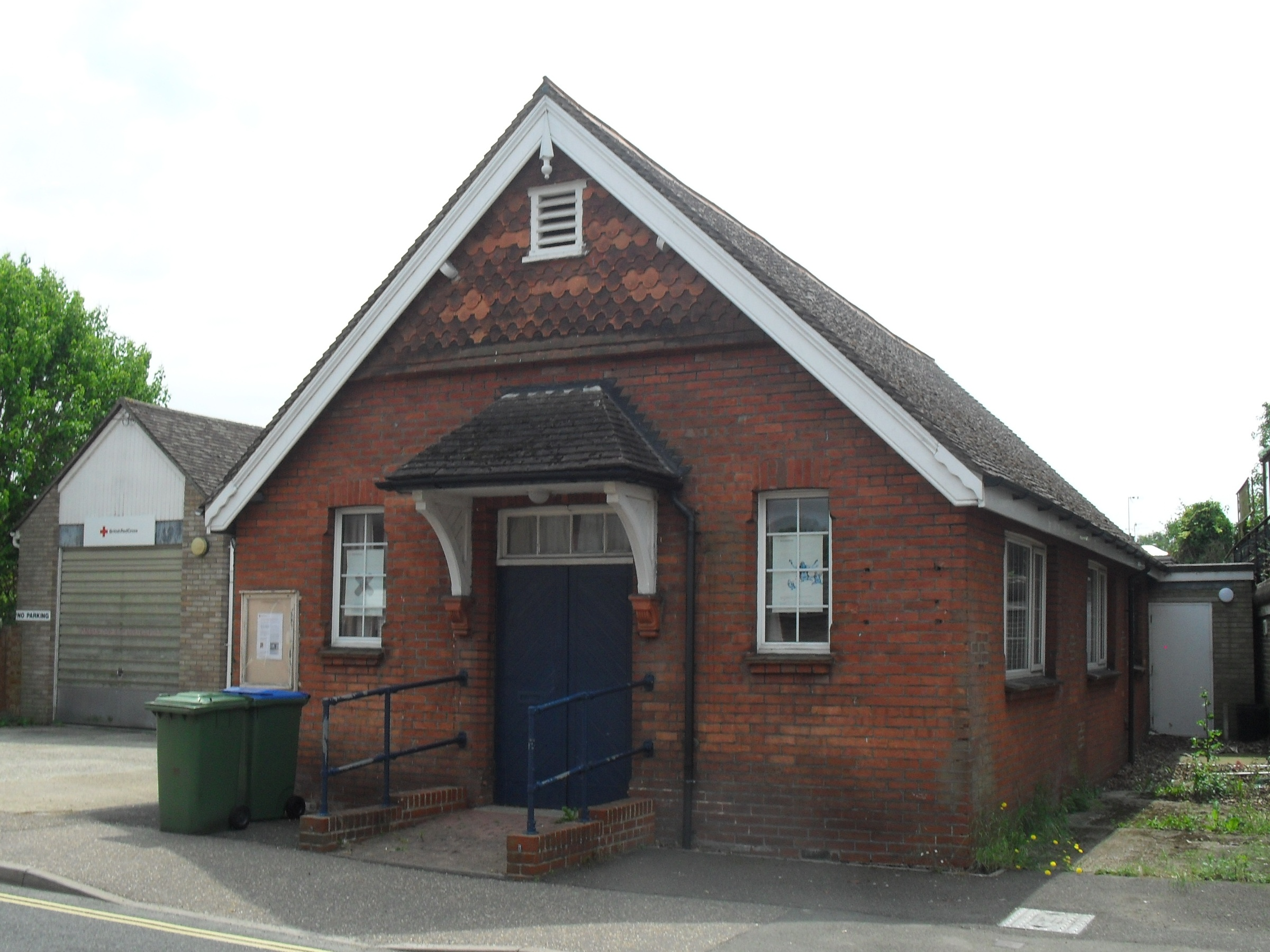
The former Primitive Methodist mission room in Rushams Road, Horsham, was in religious use only for a short time but survived until 2018.

== See also ==
- List of demolished places of worship in Brighton and Hove
- List of demolished places of worship in East Sussex
- Media related to demolished places of worship in West Sussex at Wikimedia Commons

== Bibliography ==
- Chambers, Ralph (1953). The Strict Baptist Chapels of England: Sussex. Vol. 2. Thornton Heath: Ralph Chambers.
- Elleray, D. Robert (1981). The Victorian Churches of Sussex. Chichester: Phillimore & Co. Ltd. ISBN 0-85033-378-4.
- Elleray, D. Robert (1998). A Millennium Encyclopaedia of Worthing History. Worthing: Optimus Books. ISBN 0-9533132-0-4.
- Elleray, D. Robert (2004). Sussex Places of Worship. Worthing: Optimus Books. ISBN 0-9533132-7-1.
- Homan, Roger (1997). "Mission and Fission: the organization of Huntingtonian and Calvinistic Baptist causes in Sussex in the 18th and 19th centuries". Sussex Archaeological Collections. 135. Lewes: Sussex Archaeological Society: 265–282. doi:10.5284/1085045. ISSN 0143-8204.
- Jackson, Wilfrid (2005). Haywards Heath: a History and Celebration. Teffont: The Francis Frith Collection. ISBN 1-84589-205-4.
- Leppard, M.J. (2001). A History of East Grinstead. Chichester: Phillimore & Co. Ltd. ISBN 1-86077-164-5.
- Lewis, C.P., ed. (2009). A History of the County of Sussex: Volume 5 Part 2. Littlehampton and District (Arundel Rape, South-Eastern Part, comprising Poling Hundred). Victoria County History. Vol. 5 (ii). Woodbridge: Boydell Press. ISBN 978-1-90435-619-6.
- Lines, Wendy (1995). Billingshurst. The Archive Photographs Series. Chalford: Chalford Publishing Company. ISBN 0-7524-0301-X.
- Lines, Wendy (2002). Images of England: Billingshurst and Wisborough Green. Stroud: Tempus Publishing. ISBN 0-7524-2482-3.
- Nairn, Ian; Pevsner, Nikolaus (1965). The Buildings of England: Sussex. Harmondsworth: Penguin Books. ISBN 0-14-071028-0.
- Stell, Christopher (2002). Nonconformist Chapels and Meeting-houses in Eastern England. Swindon: English Heritage. ISBN 1-873592-50-7.
- Stenton Eardley, Frank (1939). Horsted Keynes, Sussex: The Church and Parish of St Giles. London: Macmillan & Co. Ltd.
- London Road Methodist Church Horsham 1832–2007: The Story So Far. Horsham: London Road Methodist Church. 2007.
- Wilcox, Antony (2004). National Index of Parish Registers, Vol. 4, Part2: Sussex. London: Society of Genealogists. ISBN 9781903462836.
- s.n. (1980). Littlehampton Methodism 1800–1980. Littlehampton: Littlehampton Methodist Church.
