= List of civil parishes in Chichester (district) =

The 67 civil parishes in Chichester District are listed below. The Sussex Family History Group have produced a map showing the location of each parish.

Civil parish	Area (km^{2})	Population	Density (/km^{2})
Appledram	4.34	169 (2011)	39
Barlavington	3.97	117 (2001)	43
Bepton	7.93	234 (2011)	31
Bignor	4.71	103 (2001)	22
Birdham	6.96	1483 (2011)	202
Bosham	13.75	2900 (2011)	210
Boxgrove	11.69	957 (2011)	77
Bury	13.15	642 (2011)	53
Chichester	10.67	26795 (2011)	2225
Chidham and Hambrook	10.72	1356 (2011)	117
Cocking	10.16	420 (2011)	45
Compton	17.51	463 (2011)	22
Donnington	4.52	2059 (2011)	431
Duncton	8.00	345 (2011)	44
Earnley	7.10	459 (2011)	63
Eartham	8.36	111 (2011)	12
Easebourne	17.95	1820 (2011)	96
East Dean	16.66	206 (2011)	13
East Lavington	7.97	273 (2011)	45
East Wittering and Bracklesham	3.85	4658 (2011)	1070
Ebernoe	12.39	213 (2011)	19
Elsted and Treyford	15.90	246 (2011)	16
Fernhurst	23.37	2942 (2011)	118
Fishbourne	3.87	2325 (2011)	505
Fittleworth	11.64	978 (2011)	80
Funtington	20.02	1549 (2011)	72
Graffham	11.81	516 (2011)	43
Harting	32.16	1451 (2011)	44
Heyshott	9.38	270 (2011)	33
Hunston	4.62	1257 (2011)	241
Kirdford	20.09	1063 (2011)	45
Lavant	16.53	1656 (2011)	96
Linch	3.44	78 (2001)	23
Linchmere	9.03	2392 (2011)	246
Lodsworth	12.46	672 (2011)	55
Loxwood	18.24	1480 (2011)	74
Lurgashall	20.97	609 (2011)	28
Marden	6.63	79 (2001)	12
Midhurst	3.33	4914 (2011)	1467
Milland	20.34	891 (2011)	41
North Mundham	10.27	1201 (2011)	114
Northchapel	13.62	797 (2011)	60
Oving	13.96	1051 (2011)	73
Petworth	26.90	3057 (2011)	103
Plaistow and Ifold	21.02	1898 (2011)	90
Rogate	23.17	1556 (2011)	65
Selsey	12.28	10737 (2011)	804
Sidlesham	17.53	1171 (2011)	65
Singleton	16.02	480 (2011)	30
Southbourne	10.68	6265 (2011)	562
Stedham with Iping	10.81	767 (2011)	75
Stopham	3.54	87 (2001)	25
Stoughton	28.97	659 (2011)	22
Sutton	9.20	425 (2011)	21
Tangmere	4.67	2625 (2011)	527
Tillington	14.16	524 (2011)	35
Trotton with Chithurst	7.68	329 (2011)	43
Upwaltham	4.94	25 (2001)	5
West Dean	24.84	481 (2011)	17
West Itchenor	4.13	289 (2011)	109
West Lavington	2.45	276 (2011)	121
West Thorney	12.23	1183 (2011)	88
West Wittering	13.63	2700 (2011)	197
Westbourne	7.47	2309 (2011)	286
Westhampnett	8.89	709 (2011)	52
Wisborough Green	17.57	1414 (2011)	77
Woolbeding with Redford	7.29	147 (2011)	22
