= Iping and Stedham Commons =

Nature reserve in West Sussex, England

Iping Common
- Site of Special Scientific Interest
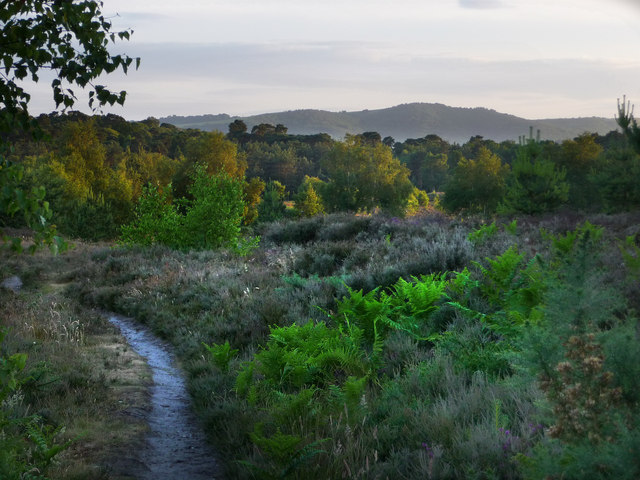

- Location within West Sussex
- Location of Iping Common.
- Area of search: West Sussex
- Grid reference: SU 849 219
- Coordinates: 50.990°N 0.792°W
- Interest: Biological
- Area: 125.4 hectares (310 acres)
- Notification date: 1986
- Location map: Magic Map

Iping and Stedham Commons is a nature reserve owned and managed by the Sussex Wildlife Trust. It is a 125.4-hectare (310-acre) biological Site of Special Scientific Interest (designated as Iping Common but covering both commons) near the villages of Iping and Stedham, west of Midhurst in West Sussex. It is also a Local Nature Reserve and a Nature Conservation Review site, Grade 2.

This is described by Natural England as one of the richest areas of heath in the county. Most of it is dry but there are also areas of wet heath, two ponds, woodland, scrub and grassland. It has a rich invertebrate fauna and breeding heathland birds include nightjars and stonechats.

There is access from Elsted Road, which runs between the two commons.
