= Alwyne Michael Webster Whistler =

British general (1909–1993)

Major-General Alwyne Michael Webster Whistler, CB, CBE (30 December 1909 – 30 September 1993) was a British Army officer who served chiefly with the Royal Corps of Signals (abbreviated R Signals), spending many years in India and Germany.

During the Second World War Whistler saw active service against the Japanese in Burma. He ended his career as Assistant Chief of the Defence Staff (Signals) and was also Colonel Commandant of the R Signals.

== Life ==
Webster was the second son of the Rev. Webster William Whistler, of Elsted, Sussex, and Lilian, daughter of Rev. Richard Corker Meade, vicar of St Neots, Huntingdonshire, of a cadet branch of the family of the Earls of Clanwilliam. The Whistler family had a clerical tradition; Webster Whistler's father, Rose Fuller Whistler (1825–1894), was rector of Elton, Huntingdonshire, formerly vicar of Ashburnham, near Battle, Sussex, his elder brother Charles was a clergyman as well as a writer of historical fiction, and his elder son, Alwyne's brother, Humphrey — also a dedicated amateur entomologist — took holy orders. The family were related to the artist brothers Rex Whistler and Laurence Whistler, as well as, distantly, to the artist James Abbott McNeill Whistler.

Whistler was educated at Gresham's School and the Royal Military Academy, Woolwich, after which he was commissioned as a second lieutenant into the R Sigs in 1929. From 1932 to 1944 he served in India, and was Master of Fox Hounds to the Nerbudda Vale Hunt from 1938 to 1940. In 1944 he passed the Staff College, then fought in the Burma campaign with the 19th and 25th Indian Divisions and the Twelfth Army, being twice mentioned in despatches. In 1946 he was posted to Berlin and was Military Adviser to the Military Governor of Germany, 1946 to 1948. After a year as Assistant Quartermaster-General at the War Office, he went to the Combined Staff College in 1950. He was commanding officer of the R Sigs, 3rd Division, 1951–1954, a Colonel at the War Office, 1955–1957, a Colonel of Far East Land Forces, 1957–1958, commanding officer of Corps of Royal Signals, 1 (British) Corps, BAOR, 1959–1960, then Signal Officer-in-Chief at the War Office, 1960–1962. His next posting was as Chairman of the British Joint Communications Board at the Ministry of Defence, from 1962 to 1964, before he completed his career as Assistant Chief of the Defence Staff (Signals), 1964–1965.

In 1936, Whistler married Margaret Louise Michelette Welch, a daughter of Brigadier-General Malcolm Welch, of Stedham, Sussex, and they had one son and two daughters. His wife died in 1986, and Whistler himself in 1993.

At the time of his death, Whistler was living at 8, Shirley Road, Wareham, Dorset. He left an estate valued at £273,900.

== Honours ==
- CBE, Birthday Honours, 1960
- CB (military division), 1963
- Hon. Colonel, Princess Louise's Kensington Regiment (41st Signals) Territorial Army, 1963–1966
- Colonel Commandant, Royal Corps of Signals, 1964–1968
- Hon. Colonel, 32nd (Scottish) Signal Regiment (Volunteers), 1967–1972
- Princess Mary Medal, Royal Signals Institution, 1978
