= Didling =

Village in West Sussex, England

Coordinates: 50.95945°N 0.80993°W

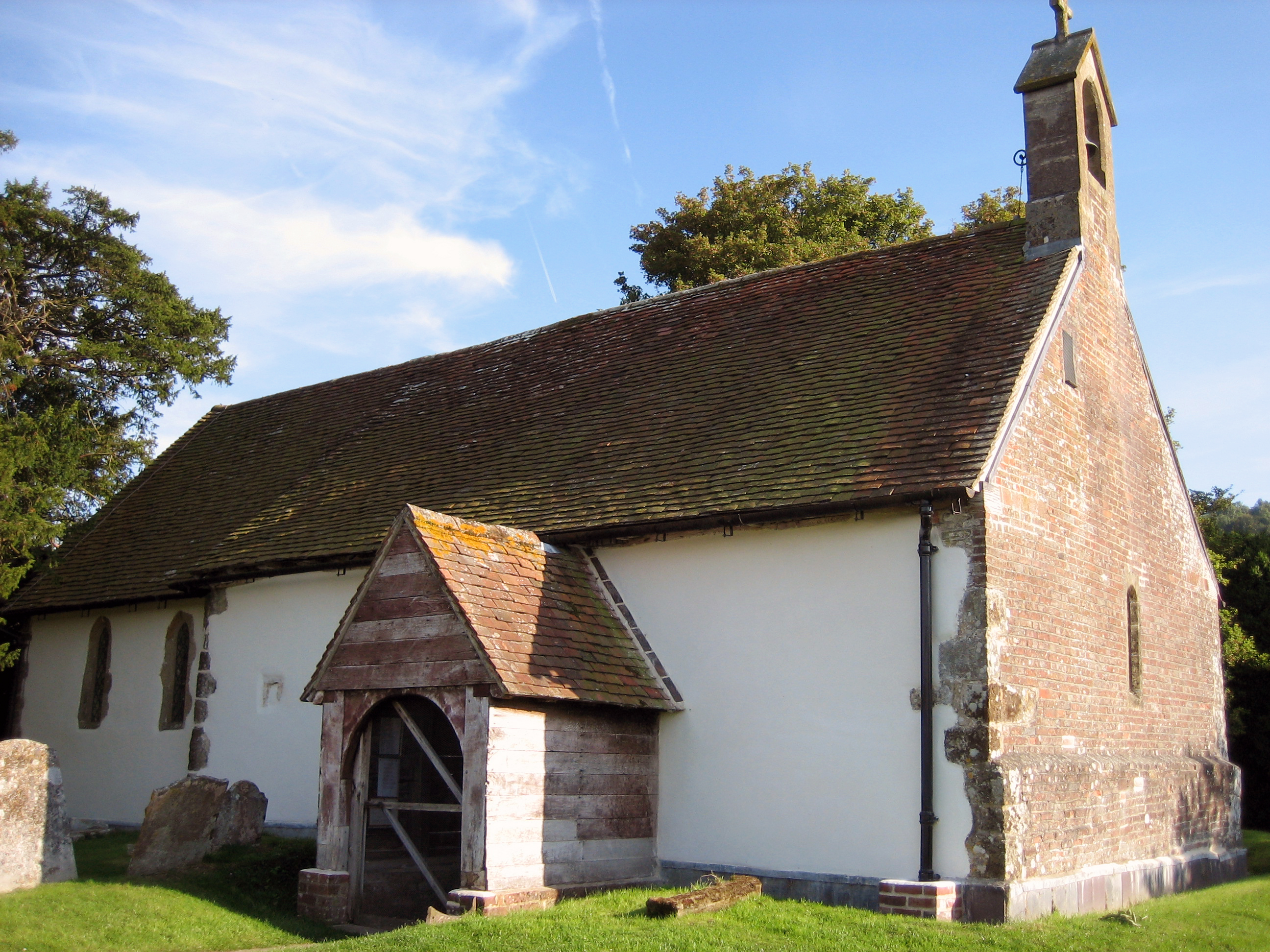
- Church of St. Andrew

- Location within West Sussex
- OS grid reference: SU836184
- Civil parish: Elsted and Treyford
- District: Chichester
- Shire county: West Sussex
- Region: South East
- Country: England
- Sovereign state: United Kingdom
- Post town: Midhurst
- Postcode district: GU29 0
- Police: Sussex
- Fire: West Sussex
- Ambulance: South East Coast
- UK Parliament: Chichester

Didling is a village in the civil parish of Elsted and Treyford, in the Chichester district of West Sussex, England. It lies on the Treyford to Bepton road 3.5 miles (5.7 km) south-west of Midhurst. The 824 acre village lies under Didling Hill and consists of a few buildings and the historic church of St Andrew's, which dates to the 13th century. In 1931 the parish had a population of 99. On 1 April 1933 the parish was abolished and merged with Treyford.

== St Andrew's Church ==
The 13th century church of St Andrew, known as "The Shepherds' Church", sits a little to the south of the village on the northern slope of Didling Hill. The nave and chancel date to the 13th century, and was constructed of plastered rubble with ashlar dressings. The wooden porch is modern.
In 1587, Salisbury founder John Wallis cast a bell inscribed "I W 1587", which was stolen in February 1979. As a result, a smaller bell measuring 15.75" in diameter was transferred from Whitsbury church, Hampshire, which had been cast by the same founder in 1623. The old bell measured 17.13" in diameter and was chimed by an iron lever The west wall is brick, and was probably remodeled in the 17th century. The font may be from the 12th century.
