= Malcolm Welch =

New Zealand Anglican priest

Malcolm Cranstoun Welch was an Anglican priest in the Twentieth century.

Welch was educated at Christchurch College of Education. He was ordained deacon and priest in 1961. After a curacy at St Peter, Wellington he was the Chaplain at the city's hospital from 1964 to 1968. He was Vicar of Greymouth from 1964 to 1969; Archdeacon of Māwhera from 1975 until 1976; and then of Nelson from 1976.
