= Trotton with Chithurst =

Parish in West Sussex, England

Coordinates: 50.995893°N 0.809682°W

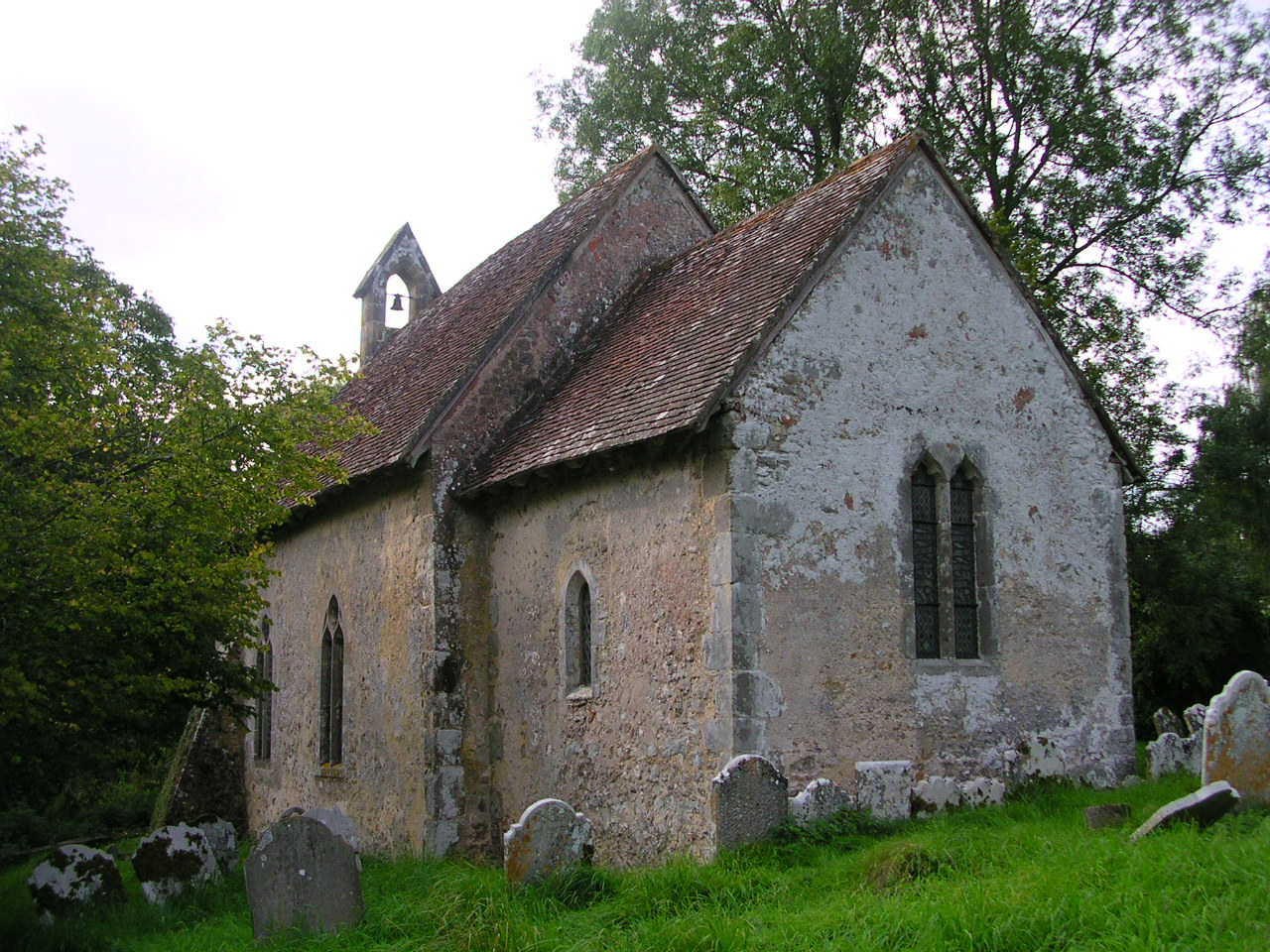
- St Mary’s Church, Chithurst

- Location within West Sussex
- Area: 7.68 km^{2} (2.97 sq mi)
- Population: 329 (2011)
  - Density: 43/km^{2} (110/sq mi)
- OS grid reference: SU836225
  - London: 46 miles (74 km) NE
- Civil parish: Trotton with Chithurst
- District: Chichester
- Shire county: West Sussex
- Region: South East
- Country: England
- Sovereign state: United Kingdom
- Post town: PETERSFIELD
- Postcode district: GU31
- Dialling code: 01730
- Police: Sussex
- Fire: West Sussex
- Ambulance: South East Coast
- UK Parliament: Chichester
- Website: Village council

Trotton with Chithurst is a civil parish in the Chichester district of West Sussex, England. Trotton is on the A272 road 7 miles (11 km) west of Midhurst. Chithurst is about 1 mile (1.6 km) northeast of Trotton. The parish also contains the hamlet of Dumpford, a former Hundred.

In the 2001 census the parish covered 7.7 square kilometres (3.0 sq mi) and had 129 households with a total population of 328. 160 residents were economically active. At the 2011 Census the population had only increased marginally to 329.

There are 28 listed buildings in the civil parish: three at Grade I, and three at Grade II*.

It is the smallest location in Britain to have permanent traffic lights.

== Trotton ==
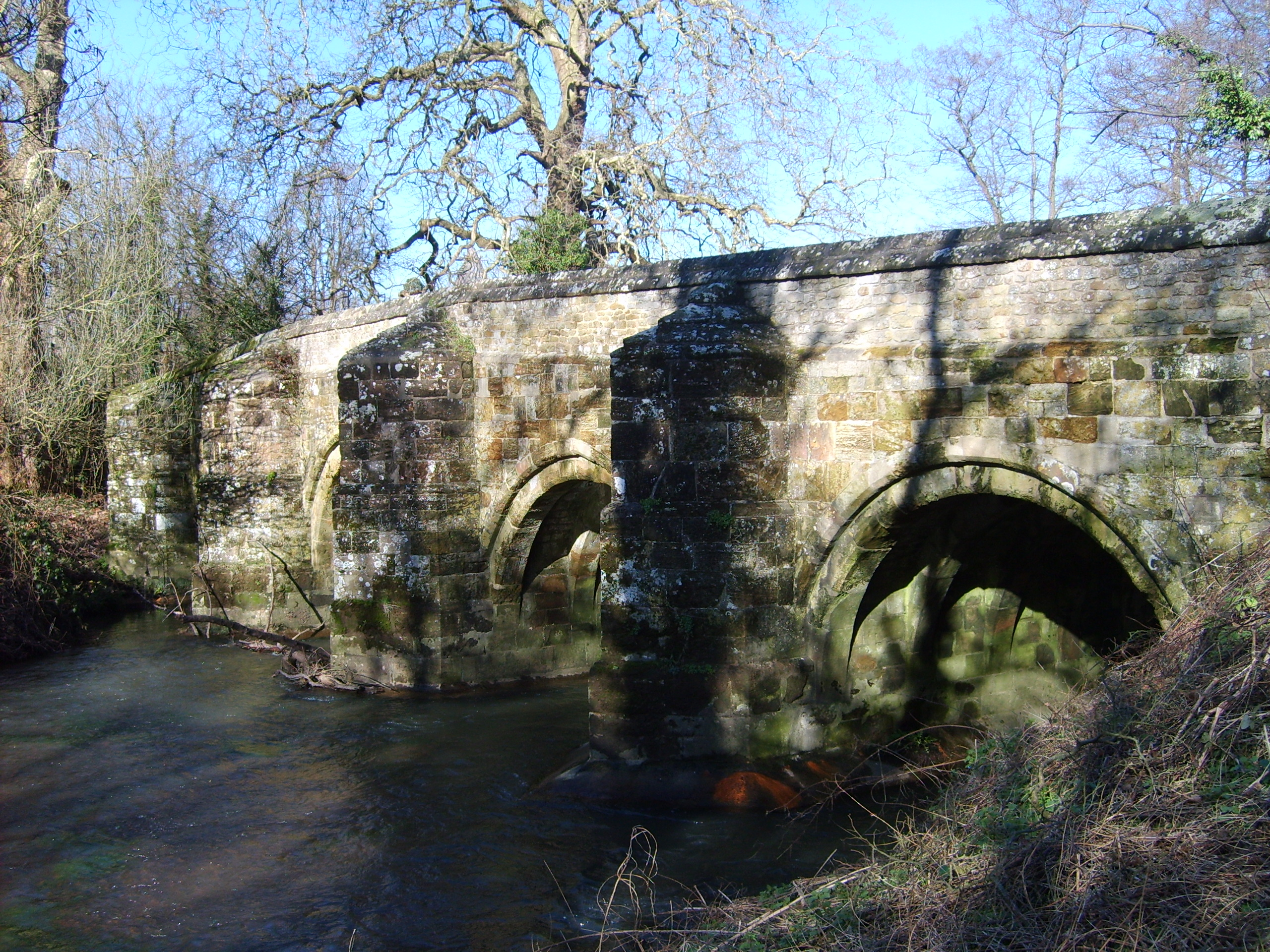
Trotton Bridge, circa 1600 AD

The village of Trotton is an Anglican parish on the A272, which passes over the River Rother near the church. Traffic over the sandstone bridge, which is Grade I listed and dates to about 1600, is controlled by traffic lights because it is too narrow for two vehicles to pass.

=== Parish church ===
St George's Church dates to around 1230, and was rebuilt in about 1400. The church is used by the British Orthodox Church once a month.

=== History ===
Trotton (Traitone or Trattone) was listed in the Domesday Book (1086) in the ancient hundred of Dumpford as having 14 households comprising four villagers and ten smallholders; with ploughing land, woodland, meadows, a mill and a church, it had a value to the lord of the manor of £5.

In 1861, the population of the Anglican parish was 452, and its area was 3,877 acres (1,569 ha).

=== Notable people ===
According to Samuel Johnson, the author Thomas Otway was born in Trotton (Johnson calls it "Trottin") in 1652. Otway's father, Humphrey, was curate of the parish.

== Chithurst ==
The village of Chithurst contains St Mary's Church and Cittaviveka, the Chithurst Buddhist Monastery.

The church dates to the 11th century. It is one of the smallest recorded in Taylor & Taylor’s Anglo-Saxon Architecture, and exhibits Saxon features in the proportions, the thinness of the walls, a splayed window in the south chancel wall, long-and-short work quoins with large shaped stones, and some herringbone work in the stone rubble masonry of the walls. It consists of a nave and chancel which show these signs of construction in the Anglo-Saxon era, with a later west porch and bell turret.

Chithurst (Titcherste) was listed in the Domesday Book (1086) in the ancient hundred of Dumpford as having 14 households comprising six villagers, five smallholders and three slaves; with ploughing land, woodland, meadows, a mill and a church, it had a value to the lord of the manor of £3.

In 1861, Chithurst had a population of 213 and an area of 1,047 acres (424 ha) of which, according to Kelly's 1867 Directory "about 360 are waste and wood land".

== Dumpford ==
Dumpford is a hamlet located on a minor road between Trotton and Elsted railway station, and also the name of an historic Hundred, which in 1086 encompassed 277 households in the settlements of South Harting, East Harting and West Harting, Elsted, Treyford, Chithurst and Trotton.

Dumpford has an hotel, Southdowns Country Hotel, a sewage works and Terwick watermill. The mill, which is two attached mills on the same site, the earlier dating from at least 1635, is listed Grade II*.
