= Stedham with Iping =

Civil parish in West Sussex, England

Coordinates: 50.99587°N 0.77917°W

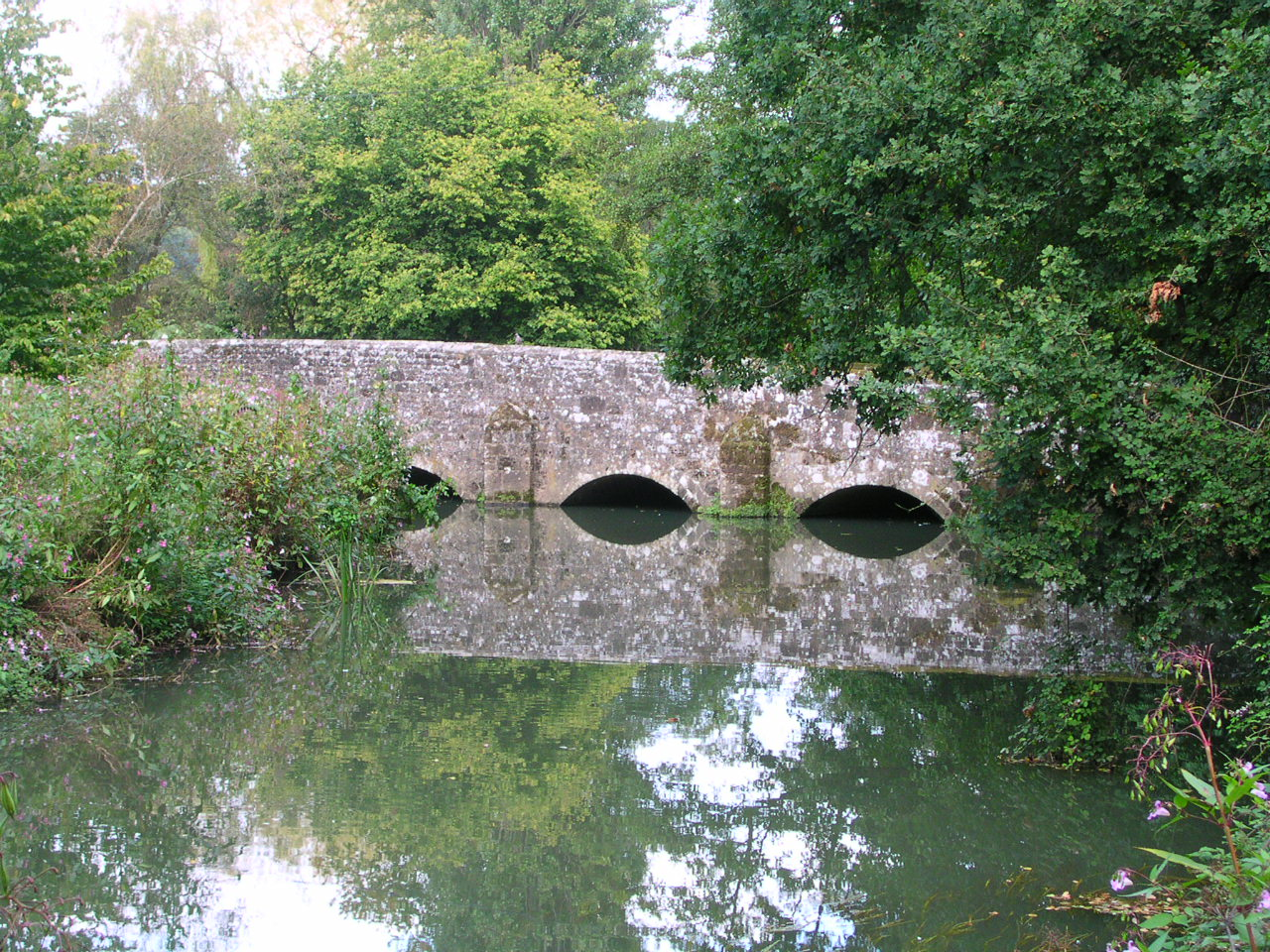
- Stedham Bridge

- Location within West Sussex
- Area: 10.81 km^{2} (4.17 sq mi)
- Population: 767. 2011 Census
  - Density: 75/km^{2} (190/sq mi)
- OS grid reference: SU857225
  - London: 45 miles (72 km) NE
- Civil parish: Stedham with Iping
- District: Chichester
- Shire county: West Sussex
- Region: South East
- Country: England
- Sovereign state: United Kingdom
- Post town: MIDHURST
- Postcode district: GU29
- Dialling code: 01730
- Police: Sussex
- Fire: West Sussex
- Ambulance: South East Coast
- UK Parliament: Arundel and South Downs

Stedham with Iping is a civil parish in the Chichester district of West Sussex, England. It is approximately two miles (3 km) west of Midhurst and comprises the two villages of Stedham and Iping. There are two churches in the parish: St James' in Stedham and St Mary's in Iping. Its watermill (now disused) was used for the production of blotting paper.

In the 2001 census the parish had an area of 11 km^{2} (2,671 acres) and had 346 households with a total population of 814. 413 residents were economically active. The population at the 2011 Census was 767.

Former parish residents include Kerry Packer who maintained a polo team in the area.

One of the stories of H. G. Wells, "The Invisible Man" begins when the bandaged invisible man comes to a village called Iping to rent a room, gets discovered, and has to fight frightened villagers to get away.
