= Elsted railway station =

Former railway station in England

Coordinates: 50.9787°N 0.8139°W

Elsted
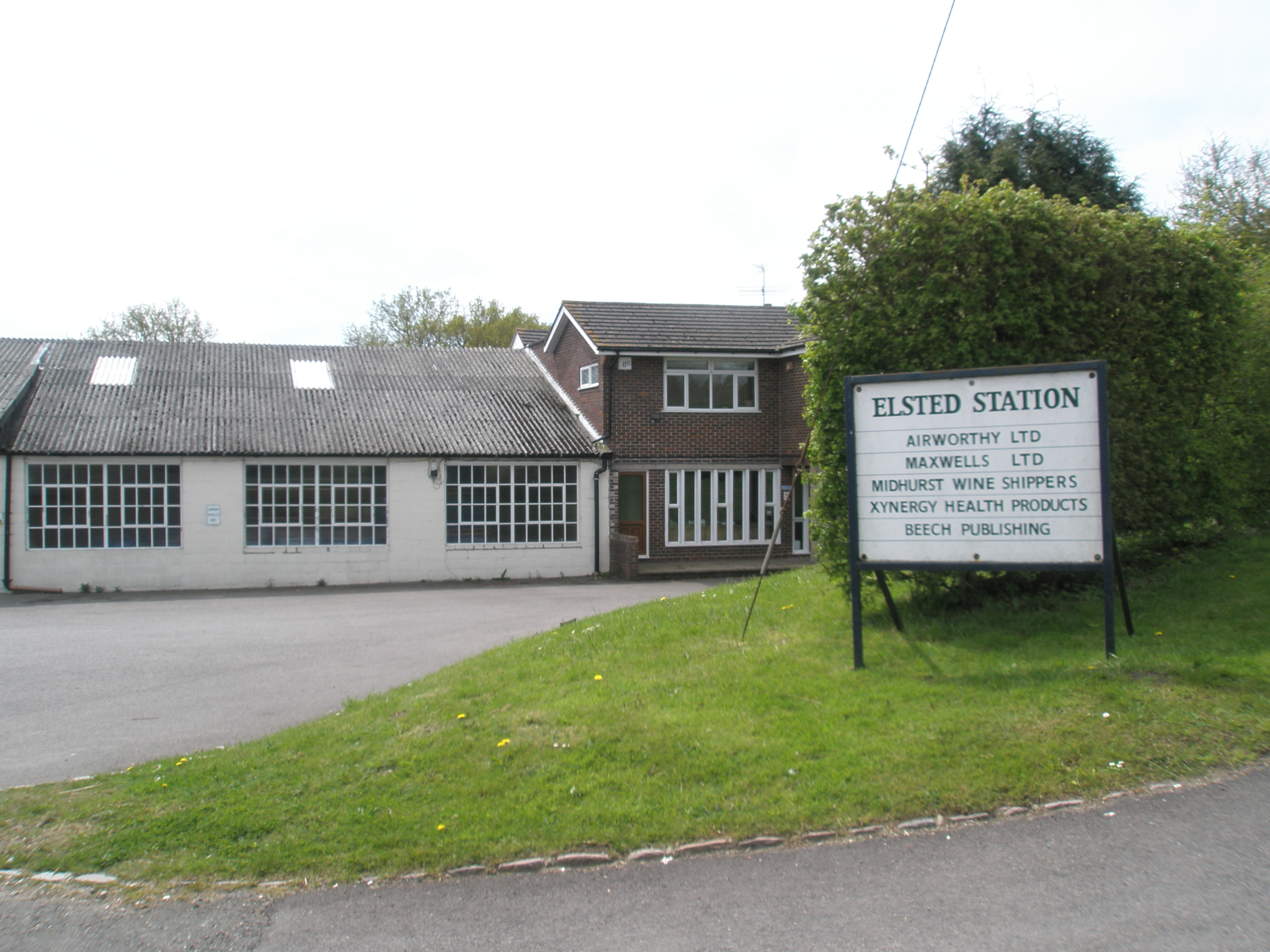
- Site of former station

General information
- Location: Elsted, Chichester, West Sussex; England
- Grid reference: SU834206
- Platforms: 1

Other information
- Status: Disused

History
- Pre-grouping: London and South Western Railway
- Post-grouping: Southern Railway; Southern Region of British Railways

Key dates
- 1 September 1864: Station opened
- 7 February 1955: Station closed
Location

Elsted railway station served the village of Elsted in the county of West Sussex in England. The village itself was 1 mile (1.6 km) away to the south-west. The station, in a settlement now known as Elsted Marsh, was on the line between Petersfield and Midhurst, which was operational between 1 September 1864 and the last train on 5 February 1955. The station building has now been cleared for an industrial development, although nearby railway cottages are still in existence.

| Preceding station | Disused railways | Following station |
|---|---|---|
| Rogate | Midhurst Railways | Midhurst (LSWR) |
