= Stedham =

Village in West Sussex, England

Coordinates: 50.99253°N 0.77336°W

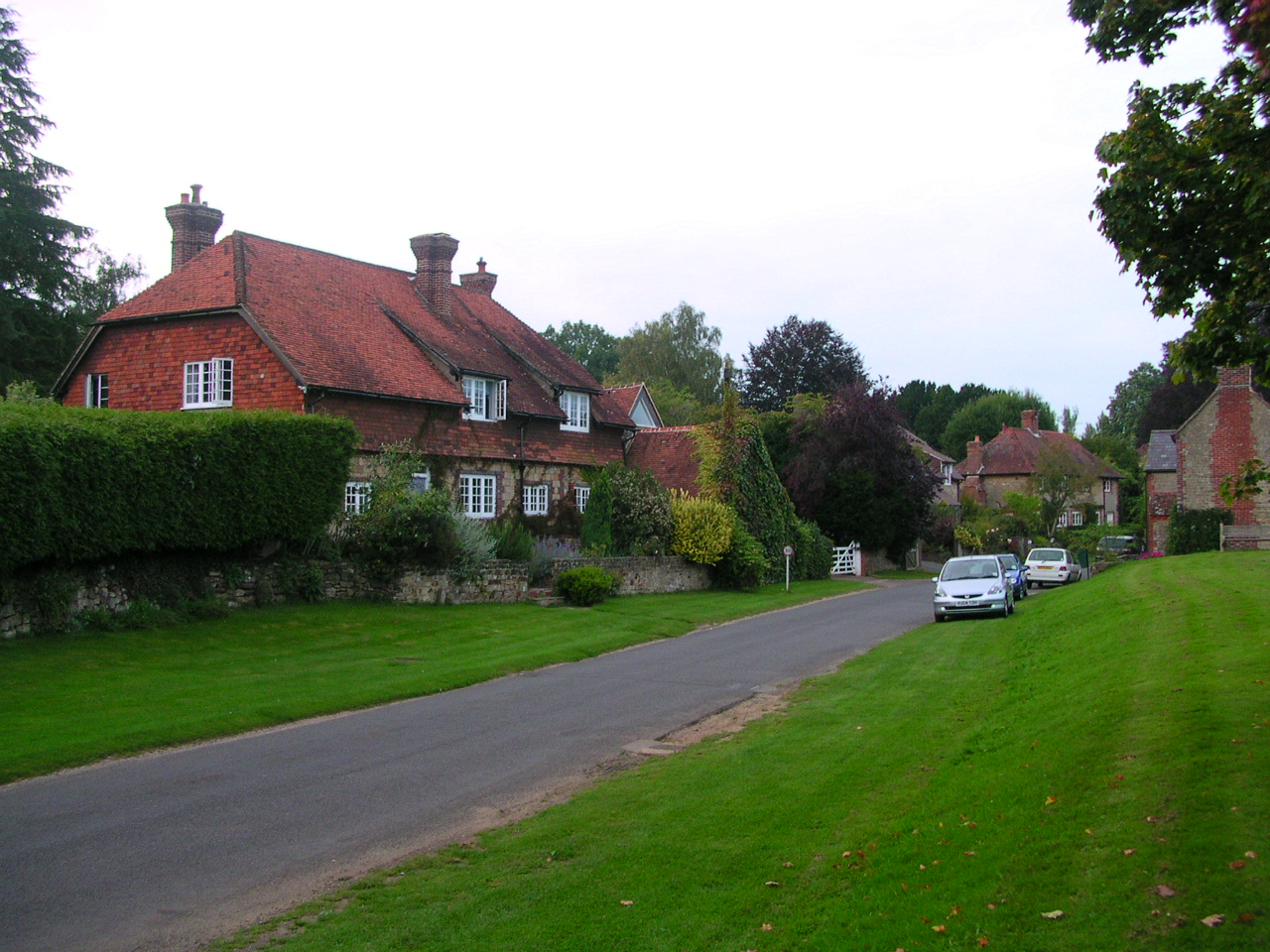

- Location within West Sussex
- OS grid reference: SU861221
- Civil parish: Stedham with Iping
- District: Chichester
- Shire county: West Sussex
- Region: South East
- Country: England
- Sovereign state: United Kingdom
- Post town: Midhurst
- Postcode district: GU29
- Dialling code: 01730
- Police: Sussex
- Fire: West Sussex
- Ambulance: South East Coast
- UK Parliament: Arundel and South Downs

Stedham is a village and former civil parish, now in the parish of Stedham with Iping, in the Chichester district of West Sussex, England, on the A272 road 1.5 miles (2.4 km) west of Midhurst. In 1961 the parish had a population of 649. On 1 April 1974 the parish was abolished and merged with Iping to form "Stedham with Iping".

== Governance ==
An electoral ward in the same name exists. At the 2011 Census the ward had a population of 2,114.

== Parish history ==
=== Church ===
The parish church of St James is at the north end of the village just above the River Rother. The original church was built c. 1040, however not much of this is left. The upper parts of the church are dated c. 1673. The churchyard contains a yew tree which is thought to be over 2,500 years old.

=== Domesday Book ===
The parish (then called Stedeham) was listed in the Domesday Book (1086), in the ancient hundred of Easebourne, as a large settlement having 49 households: 23 villagers, 16 smallholders and 10 slaves. Resources included ploughing land, meadows, woodland, three mills and the church.

=== 19th century ===
In 1861, the parish extended to 2,249 acres (910 ha) and the population was 530.

Stedham's watermill at the north end of the village was used for manufacturing blotting paper.

== Education ==
Stedham Primary School is the main primary school serving the village. In 2014 Durand Academy in Stockwell, South London opened a boarding school for its senior pupils at the site of the former St Cuthman's School in Stedham, The school admitted pupils from South London, however the school is now closed.
