= Treyford =

Village and parish in West Sussex, England

Coordinates: 50.95939°N 0.82708°W

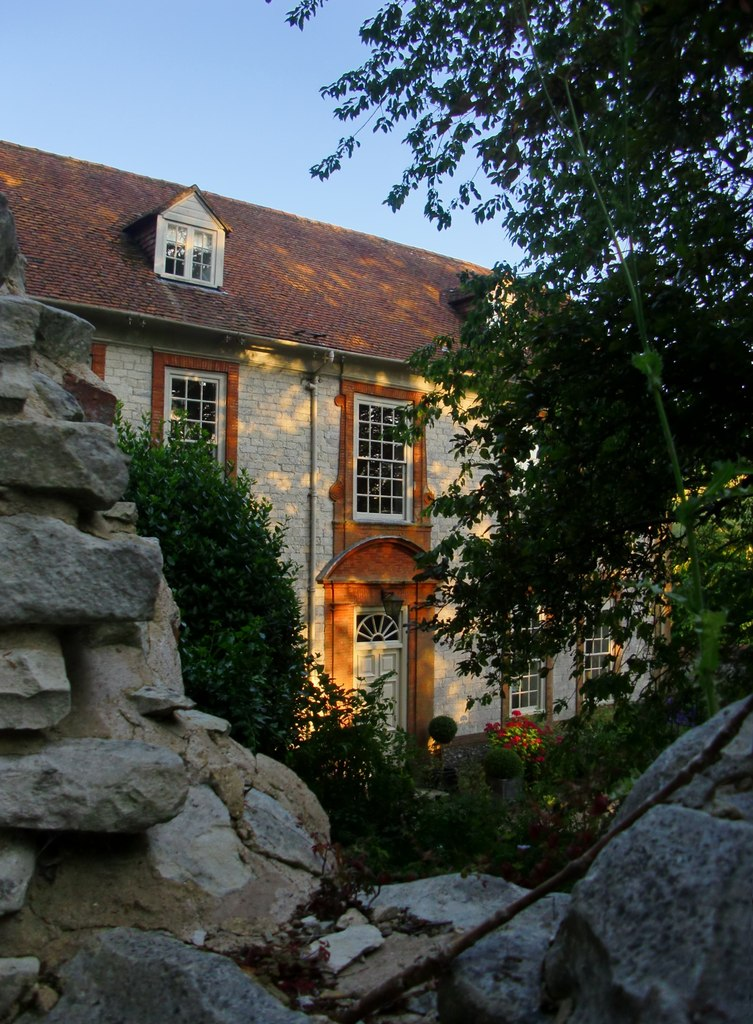
- Treyford Manor

- Location within West Sussex
- OS grid reference: SU824184
- Civil parish: Elsted and Treyford
- District: Chichester
- Shire county: West Sussex
- Region: South East
- Country: England
- Sovereign state: United Kingdom
- Post town: Midhurst
- Postcode district: GU29 0
- Police: Sussex
- Fire: West Sussex
- Ambulance: South East Coast
- UK Parliament: Chichester

Treyford is a hamlet, Anglican parish and former civil parish, now in the civil parish of Elsted and Treyford, in the Chichester district of West Sussex, England. The hamlet sits on the Elsted to Bepton Road 4 miles (6.4 km) southwest of Midhurst. In 1931 the civil parish had a population of 104.

== History ==
Treyford (Treverde) was listed in the Domesday Book of 1086 in the ancient hundred of Dumpford as having 21 households: eight villagers, eight smallholders and five slaves; with ploughing land, woodland, meadows and a mill, it had a value to the lord of the manor of £5.4. The lord of the manor was Robert, son of Theobald.

In 1861, the population was 123, and the area of the Anglican parish was 1,260 acres (510 ha). On 1 April 2003 the civil parish was abolished and merged with Elsted to form "Elsted & Treyford".

== Parish church ==
The old parish church of St Mary, according to Kelly's Directory of 1867

...is an ancient building, now disused: chancel and nave Early English, or FirstPointed, style.

Kelly's continues:

A new and handsome church (St. Peter's) was erected, and consecrated in 1849, at the sole expense of the patrons, the Rev. L. Vernon Harcourt and the Hon. Mrs. Vernon Harcourt, of West Dean House: it is from the designs of B. Ferrey, Esq., and consists of a chancel, with nave, side aisles, and tower and spire at the north-west angle: the seats are all open and of English oak, as is the high-pitched roof: the style is of the earlier Decorated period: the spire, conspicuous over the surrounding country, is 120 feet high.

The ruins of the old church are a listed building.

== See also ==
- Devil's Jumps, Treyford
- Treyford to Bepton Down
