= Elsted and Treyford =

Civil parish in West Sussex, England

Coordinates: 50.96998°N 0.83917°W

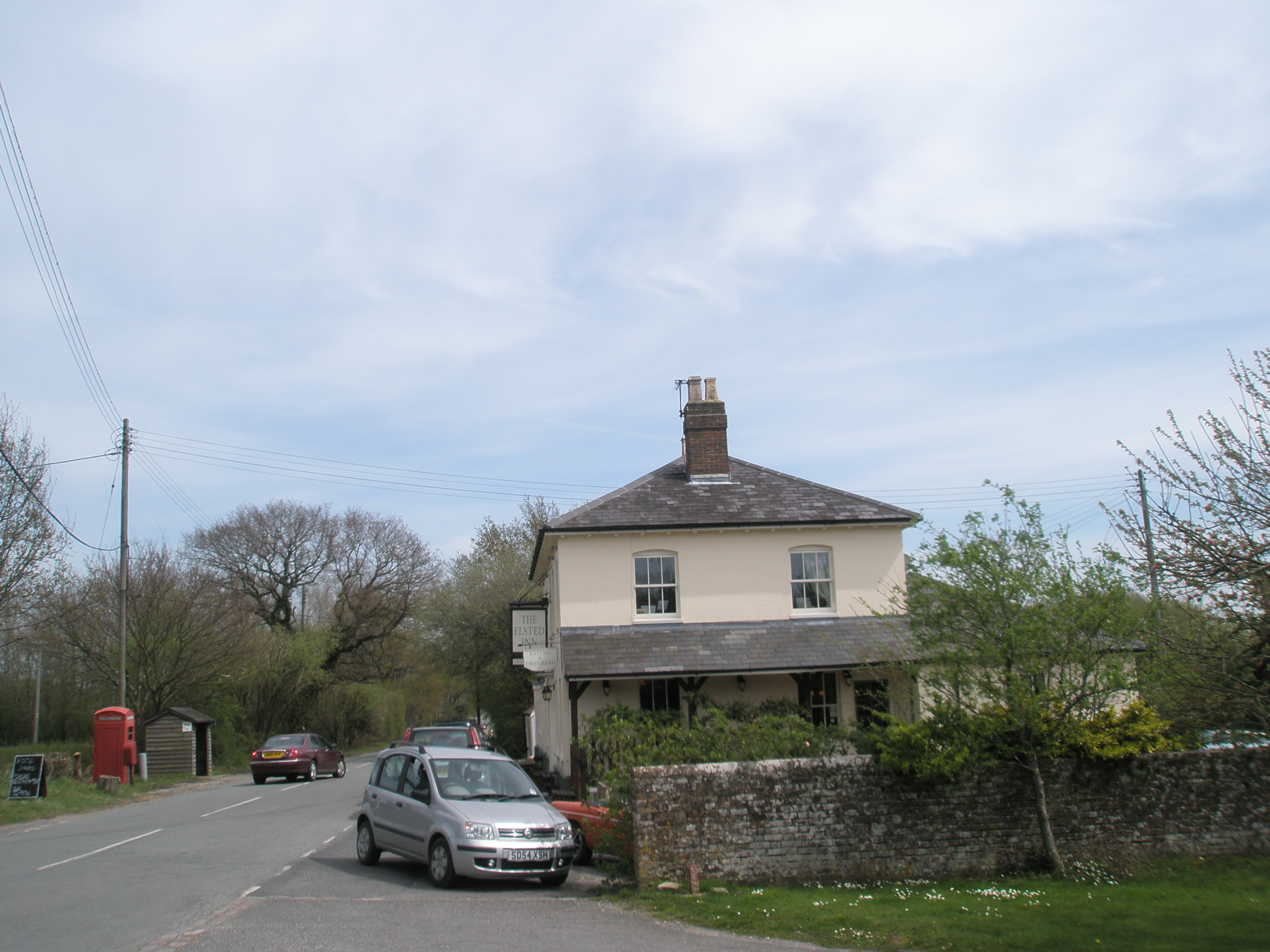
- Elsted Marsh

- Location within West Sussex
- Area: 15.90 km^{2} (6.14 sq mi)
- Population: 246 (2011)
  - Density: 16/km^{2} (41/sq mi)
- OS grid reference: SU816195
  - London: 48 miles (77 km) NE
- Civil parish: Elsted and Treyford
- District: Chichester
- Shire county: West Sussex
- Region: South East
- Country: England
- Sovereign state: United Kingdom
- Post town: MIDHURST
- Postcode district: GU29
- Dialling code: 01730
- Police: Sussex
- Fire: West Sussex
- Ambulance: South East Coast
- UK Parliament: Chichester

Elsted and Treyford is a civil parish in the Chichester district of West Sussex, west of Midhurst. It contains the settlements of Elsted, Elsted Marsh, Treyford, Didling and Hooksway.

The parish contains two churches, St Paul in Elsted and St Andrew, known as the Shepherds' Church, in the hamlet of Didling. It also contains the site of Treyford church.

Hooksway has a 16th-century pub, the Royal Oak.

In the 2001 census there were 114 households with a total population of 253 of whom 116 were economically active. At the 2011 Census the population was 246.

The Devil's Jumps, Treyford, and Beacon Hill are nearby.
