= Iping =

Village in West Sussex, England

Coordinates: 50.99853°N 0.7859°W

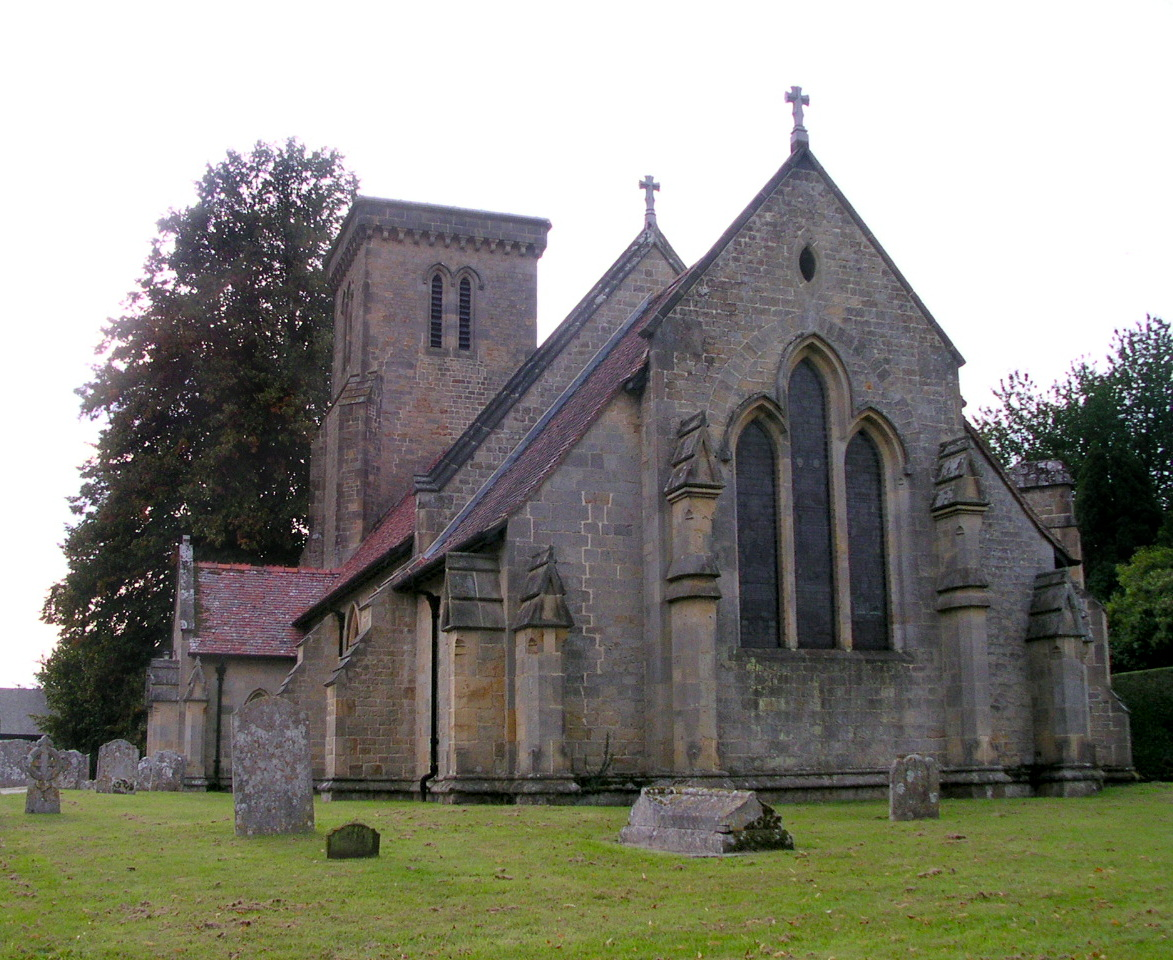
- Iping Church

- Location within West Sussex
- OS grid reference: SU852228
- Civil parish: Stedham with Iping
- District: Chichester
- Shire county: West Sussex
- Region: South East
- Country: England
- Sovereign state: United Kingdom
- Post town: Midhurst
- Postcode district: GU29
- Dialling code: 01730
- Police: Sussex
- Fire: West Sussex
- Ambulance: South East Coast
- UK Parliament: Arundel and South Downs

Iping is a village and former civil parish, now in the parish of Stedham with Iping, in the Chichester district of West Sussex, England. It lies just off the A272 road 2 miles (3.2 km) west of Midhurst, on the River Rother. In 1931 the parish had a population of 400.

== Etymology ==
The Old English name means settlement of the family or followers of a man called Ipa.

== History ==
=== Iron age ===
There is an Iron Age contour fort on the hill at Hammer Wood north of the village.

=== Iping Roman station ===
This rectangular earthwork with rounded corners lies astride the Roman road between two major British tribal centres at Noviomagus Regnorum (Chichester) and Calleva Atrebatum (Silchester), which runs north–south through Iping. Measuring 86 by 112 metres (282 ft × 367 ft), the area enclosed by the turf defences was about 0.9 ha (2 1/4 acres), and would have contained the official posting station or mansio and perhaps an iron-smithy. It is similar in size to the way stations at Hardham and Alfoldean on Stane Street. The station is situated at National Grid Reference SU:844261 (51° 1'40.46"N - 0°47'51.16"W), just over two miles to the north of Iping village and little over half a mile from the crossroads in the centre of the village of Milland, just south-east of the point where the Roman road crossed the Hammer Stream. Although unexcavated, surface finds of Roman material have been found within the confines of the earthwork. It could easily be confused with the Hammer Wood Iron Age contour fort which lies much closer to modern Iping.

=== Domesday Book ===
Iping was listed in the Domesday Book (1086) in the ancient hundred of Easebourne as having 15 households: eight villagers, two smallholders and five slaves; with woodland, ploughing land, meadows, a church and a mill, it had a value to the lord of the manor of £4.

=== Modern era ===
In 1861, the population of the parish was 404 and its area was 1,925 acres (779 ha).

Iping is the setting for the classic H. G. Wells science fiction story (1897) The Invisible Man.

Iping Water Mill was producing paper until the 1920s when a fire ended 900 years of various types of milling.

On 1 April 1974 the parish was abolished and merged with Stedham with Iping.

== Parish church ==
St Mary's Church, Iping, is a solid sandstone Victorian church which was rebuilt in 1885. The church was built on the site of an old Saxon church and it is thought an even earlier church was on the site before this.

== Commons ==
Iping Common sits south of the A272 and is managed by the Sussex Wildlife Trust. This heathland is a Site of Special Scientific Interest and is part of the larger Iping and Stedham Commons.
