= Elsted =

Village and parish in West Sussex, England

Coordinates: 50.97006°N 0.83902°W

- St Paul's Church

- Location within West Sussex
- OS grid reference: SU816195
- Civil parish: Elsted and Treyford
- District: Chichester
- Shire county: West Sussex
- Region: South East
- Country: England
- Sovereign state: United Kingdom
- Post town: Midhurst
- Postcode district: GU29 0
- Police: Sussex
- Fire: West Sussex
- Ambulance: South East Coast
- UK Parliament: Chichester

Elsted is a village, Anglican parish and former civil parish, now in the civil parish of Elsted and Treyford, in the Chichester district of West Sussex, England. The village is on the Midhurst to South Harting Road 4.5 miles (7.2 km) west of Midhurst. In 1961, the civil parish had a population of 188. On 1 April 2003, the civil parish was abolished and merged with Treyford to form "Elsted & Treyford".

== History ==
Elsted (Halestede) was listed in the Domesday Book (1086) within the ancient hundred of Dumpford. At that time, it comprised 32 households: seven villagers, 23 smallholders, and two slaves; with ploughing land, pasture and woodland for pigs, as well as a mill and a church. It had a value to the lord of the manor of £15.

In 1861, the area was 1,789 acres (724 ha), and the population was 174.

== Parish church ==
The small parish church, St. Paul's, located north of the crossroads, has a nave which had become derelict, leaving only the chancel in use as the village church until it was rebuilt in the 1950s. The surviving north wall is of Norman style herringbone stonework, with two round arched doorways filled in to make lancet windows.

== Amenities ==
The village has one public house, The Three Horseshoes, and another at the former Elsted railway station at Elsted Marsh east of the village: the Elsted Inn, formerly the Railway Inn.

== Notable people ==
- Thomas Weelkes (1575-1623), composer and organist
- Alwyne Michael Webster Whistler (1909–1993), British Army general
- William Downes Willis (1790-1871), rector at Elsted until his death

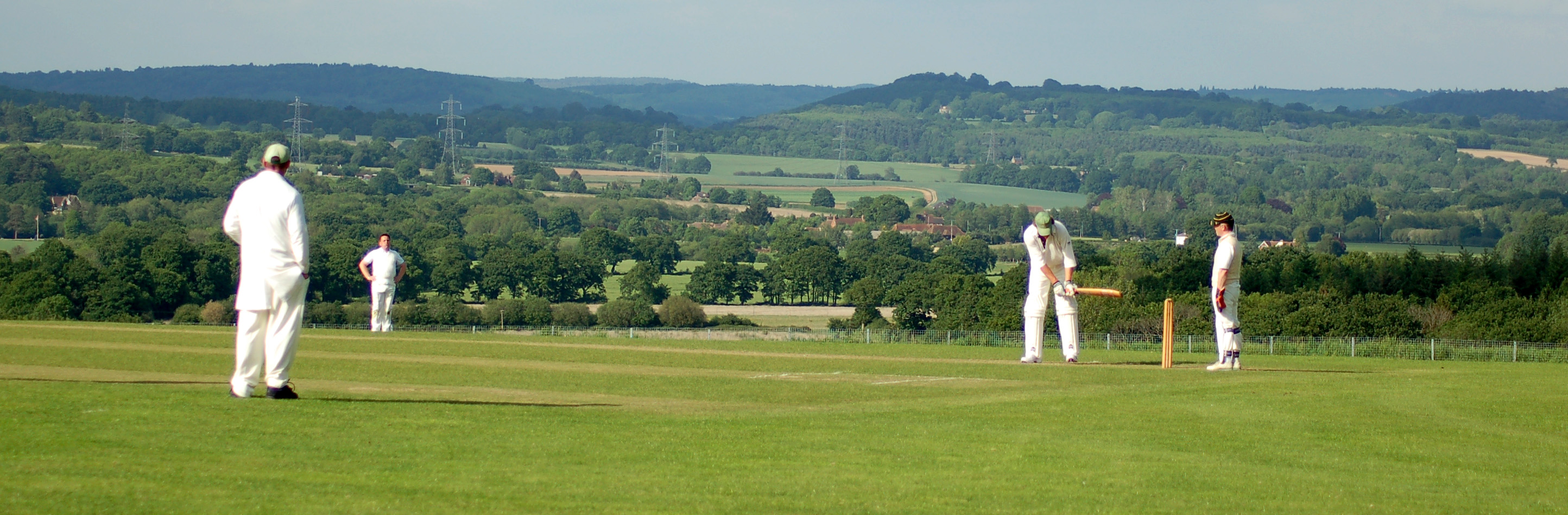
Looking north from the Village Hall over the new cricket pitch in 2007
