= Bepton =

Village and parish in West Sussex, England

Coordinates: 50.95689°N 0.78246°W

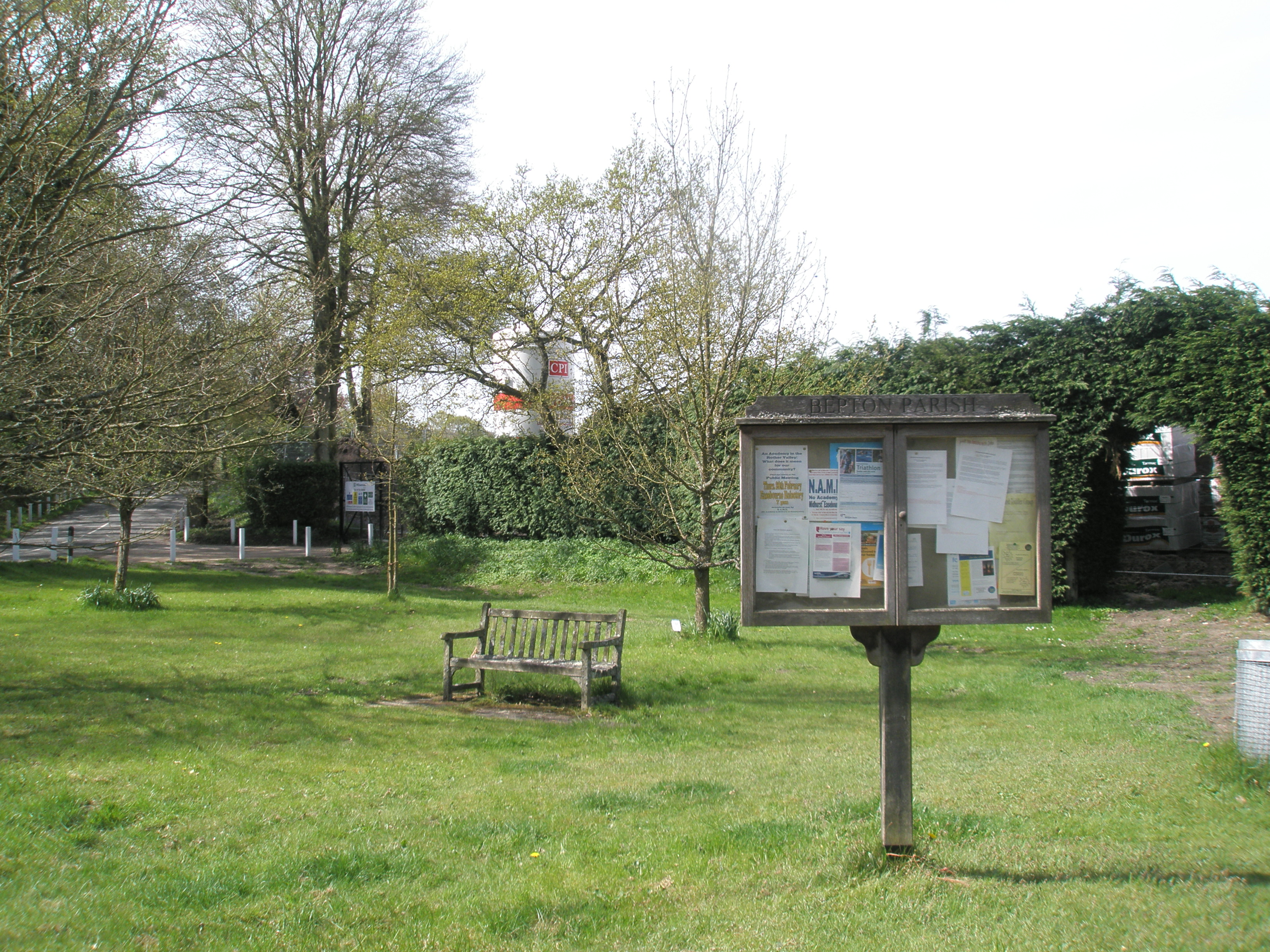
- Bepton Common

- Location within West Sussex
- Area: 7.93 km^{2} (3.06 sq mi)
- Population: 234. 2011 Census
  - Density: 31/km^{2} (80/sq mi)
- OS grid reference: SU856182
  - London: 47 miles (76 km) NE
- Civil parish: Bepton
- District: Chichester
- Shire county: West Sussex
- Region: South East
- Country: England
- Sovereign state: United Kingdom
- Post town: MIDHURST
- Postcode district: GU29
- Dialling code: 01730
- Police: Sussex
- Fire: West Sussex
- Ambulance: South East Coast
- UK Parliament: Chichester

Bepton is a village, Anglican parish and civil parish in the Chichester district of West Sussex, England. According to the 2001 census it had 104 households with a population of 249 of whom 117 were economically active. The village is about 3 miles (4.8 km) south-west of Midhurst. The hamlet of Bepton Common (grid reference SU871205) is in the north-east corner of the parish, just outside Midhurst.

== History ==
Bepton (Babintone) was listed in the Domesday Book (1086) in the ancient hundred of Easebourne as having 23 households: 10 villagers, 10 smallholders and three slaves. With ploughing land and a church, it had a value to the lord of the manor of £5. The lord was an unspecified Geoffrey, and the tenant-in-chief was Earl Roger of Shrewsbury.

In 1861, the population was 211, the parish was 1,224 acres (495 ha) and was mainly arable land. In Kelly's Directory of 1867, the church of St Mary was described as "an ancient flint building in the Anglo-Norman style, and has a nave, chancel, and tower".

In 1931, its population was documented at 292. By 1953, its area had expanded to 1,910 acres (770 hectares).

== Transport ==
Road access to Bepton is by approximately 1.5 miles (2.4 km) of country lanes off the A286 road from either Bepton Road, Midhurst, or Bell Lane, Cocking.

The nearest railway stations are 11 miles (18 km) west or north of the village, at Petersfield or Haslemere, both on the main line between London and Portsmouth.
