= List of former places of worship in Chichester District =

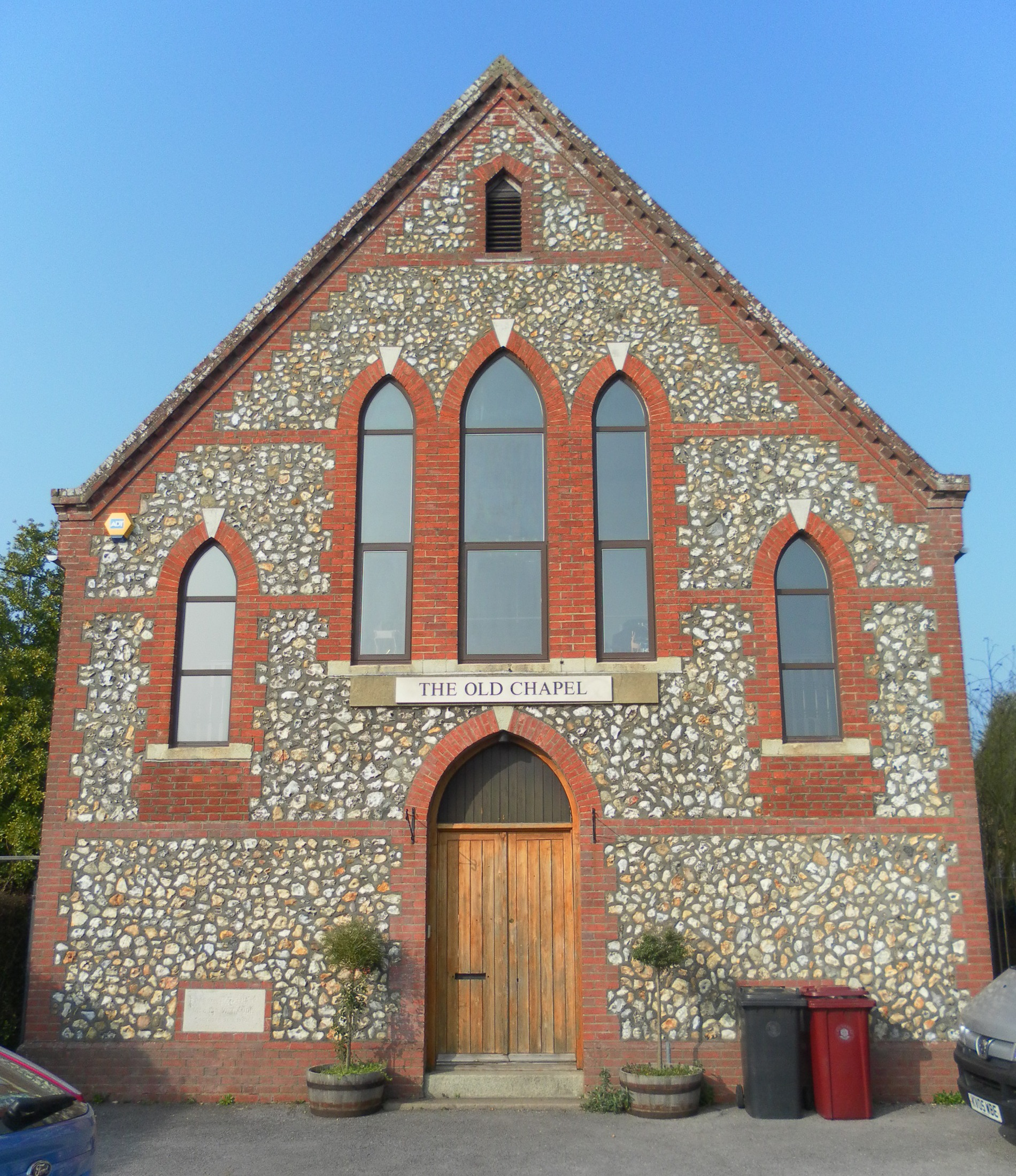
Throughout the district of Chichester, churches and chapels have fallen out of religious use and in many cases now have a new function. "The Old Chapel" at Nutbourne, now in commercial use, was built for Bible Christian worshippers in 1905.

In the district of Chichester, a large rural area in the English county of West Sussex, there are more than 50 former churches, chapels and other places of worship that still stand but that are no longer in religious use. Many are in the ancient city of Chichester, the district's largest centre of population: many medieval and Victorian Anglican churches were built there to serve tiny parishes (sometimes covering only a few streets) that were later combined with others, and chapels serving various Nonconformist denominations were closed after their congregations declined. Elsewhere, in villages and scattered farming communities in the rest of the district, churches and chapels were superseded by new buildings, closed due to declining attendance or shifts in population, or rendered unusable because of structural problems. A few former places of worship are now ruinous but still survive in derelict or fragmentary form. Many others are fully usable and have been converted to new uses: residential, commercial, educational, social and others. Some former churches stand empty awaiting a new function.

Of the 54 former places of worship in the district as of 2026, 21 have been listed by English Heritage for their architectural and historical importance. A building is defined as "listed" when it is placed on a statutory register of buildings of "special architectural or historic interest" in accordance with the Planning (Listed Buildings and Conservation Areas) Act 1990. The Department for Culture, Media and Sport, a Government department, is responsible for this; English Heritage, a non-departmental public body, acts as an agency of the department to administer the process and advise the department on relevant issues. There are three grades of listing status: Grade I, the highest, is defined as being of "exceptional interest"; Grade II* is used for "particularly important buildings of more than special interest"; and Grade II, the lowest, is used for buildings of "special interest". As of February 2001, there were 80 buildings with Grade I status, 114 with Grade II* status and 3,057 with Grade II status in the district.

== Overview of the district ==
The district of Chichester is on the west side of West Sussex.

The district of Chichester covers about 300 square miles (780 km^{2}) and takes up most of the western half of West Sussex. The population in 2011 was 113,800. The ancient city of Chichester (originally a Roman town), with 23,731 residents at the time of the 2001 Census, is the largest settlement; there are also small towns, villages and hamlets. Only East Wittering, Midhurst, Selsey and Southbourne civil parishes have more than 3,000 people.

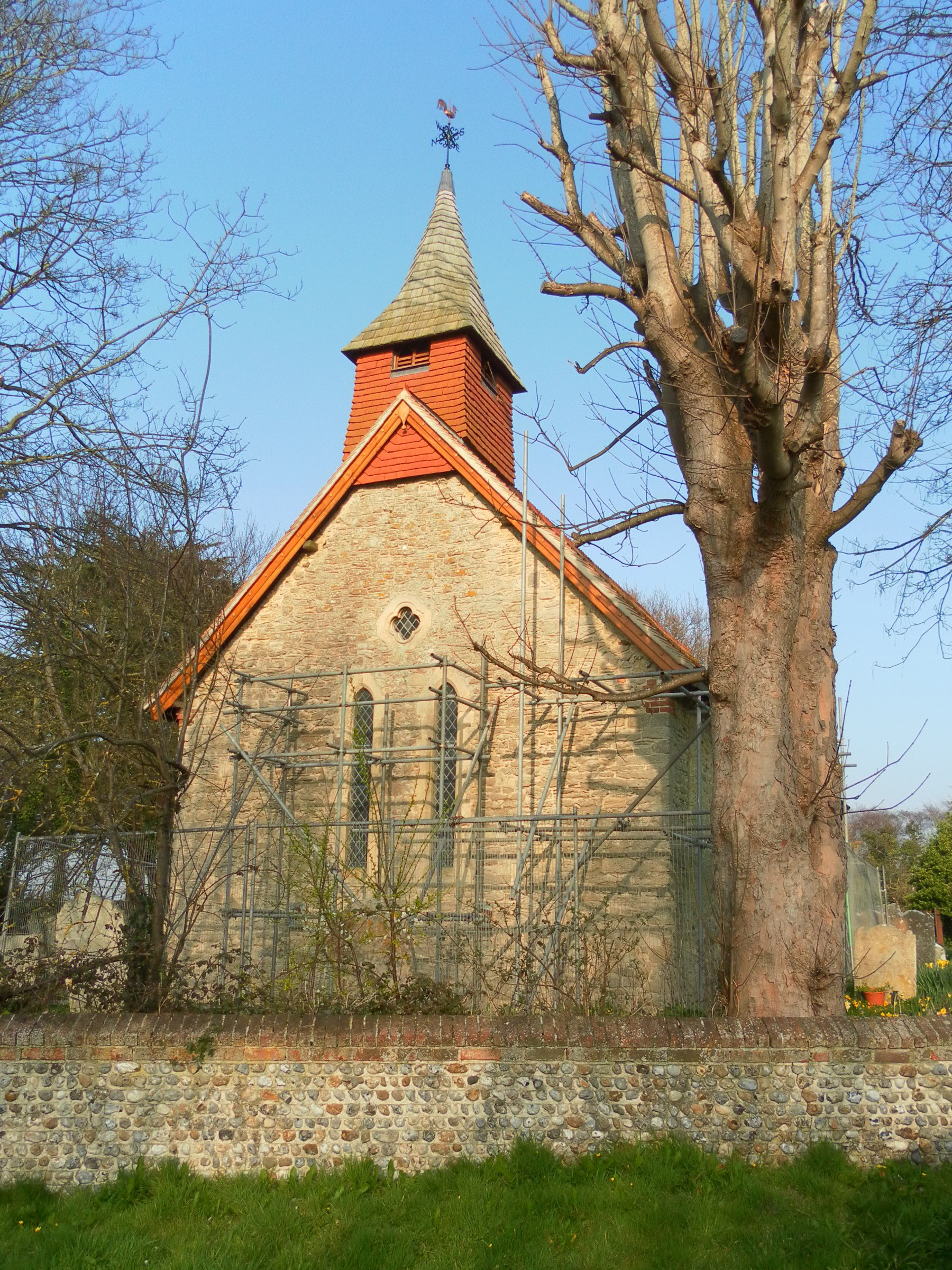
The former Church of the Assumption of St Mary the Virgin in East Wittering (photographed in March 2012) stands empty and requires ongoing maintenance.

The city of Chichester has eight former Anglican churches, including six in the ancient city centre. St Olave's Church dates from the 11th century; the Churches of All Saints-in-the-Pallant and St Andrew-in-the-Oxmarket were built in the 13th century; and the Churches of St John the Evangelist, St Bartholomew and St Peter the Great all date from the 19th century Anglican churchbuilding fervour that added hundreds of new buildings across England, not least in Sussex. Several other churches existed but have now gone, and there were eight ancient parishes; also, many of the churches were close together in the northeastern quarter of the city. This may account for both the small size of the ancient churches and the closure of many in the 20th century. Churches in the suburbs of Portfield and Rumboldswyke were declared redundant in 1981 and 1994 respectively. Portfield's is now a doll and mechanical musical instrument museum, and St Andrew-in-the-Oxmarket is an arts centre; St Olave's Church is a bookshop; Rumboldswyke and All Saints-in-the-Pallant have been converted into offices; St Peter the Great's Church has become a bar and restaurant; and the former Hornet Bible Christian Chapel is now a Chinese takeaway. Eastgate Hall, a Baptist place of worship from the 17th century until the mid-20th century, has had various secular uses including a restaurant, and is now a betting shop.

Elsewhere in the district, several other former Anglican parish churches are now closed for public worship. Examples are East Wittering, where the isolated 12th-century building was replaced with a modern church near the centre of population; Merston, where St Giles' Church was shut in 2010 because the roof was unsound; West Lavington, whose parish was united with that of Cocking when the church became too expensive for the small congregation to maintain; and Milland, where a new church was built alongside the old Tuxlith Chapel. Small settlements within larger parishes, including Bedham, Bexley Common, Henley Common and Rake, had their own mission churches (chapels of ease to the parish church) at various times during the 19th and 20th centuries but have now lost them.

Roman Catholicism has always had a strong following in West Sussex, and the two former churches of that denomination in the district both closed because they were replaced by larger buildings. At Midhurst the old church became a restaurant, and a barn served as a Mass Centre in Nutbourne until a permanent church was built at nearby Bosham. In contrast, various Protestant Nonconformist denominations that were strong in the 19th and early 20th centuries have declined, leading to the closure and sale of many chapels – often small, simple buildings in rural locations. The city of Chichester was a Presbyterian stronghold in the 18th century, supporting the Baffin's Hall chapel (now an auction gallery) from 1721. Calvinistic causes opened chapels catering for groups whose frequent splits and amalgamations led to the adoption of various denominational descriptions: chapels at Fernhurst, Midhurst and Petworth, all named Ebenezer, were used at various times by Strict Baptists, Particular Baptists, Independents and Gospel Standard Baptists, while a building with the same name in central Chichester passed from Independents to Congregationalists. The same happened at South Harting, where a meeting house (unusually built of clunch) that was provided for Independents in 1800 was ultimately superseded by a Congregational chapel, which survives in use, in 1871. Several Congregational chapels in other villages closed before the denomination united with the Presbyterian Church of England to form the United Reformed Church: Broadbridge, Cocking, Funtington and Wisborough Green all lost theirs. Even chapels that survived beyond the 1972 union were not immune from decline: Bosham Congregational Church, latterly Bosham United Reformed Church, held its final service in 2005. Methodism also experienced decline, and the gradual merger of several sub-groups (Bible Christians, Primitive Methodists, Wesleyans and others) to form the Methodist Church of Great Britain in 1932 reduced the number of chapels needed for worship. In West Sussex, just as in neighbouring counties, it proved popular to convert these buildings – sturdily built, often attractively designed and usually sold cheaply – into houses (as at Somerley, Sidlesham, Fernhurst, Walderton and West Wittering) or for commercial use, as evidenced by the former Bible Christian chapels in both Chichester and Nutbourne. The now-vanished Society of Dependants (also known as Cokelers), a small and obscure sect found in Surrey and Sussex, were based at Loxwood in Chichester district; their old chapel there is still in use by another congregation, but former Cokeler chapels in both Northchapel and Chichester have now fallen out of religious use.

== Former places of worship ==
Former places of worship
| Name | Image | Location | Denomination/ Affiliation | Grade | Notes | Refs |
|---|---|---|---|---|---|---|
| St Michael and All Angels Church | | Bedham; 50.9876°N 0.5534°W | Anglican | – | William Townley Mitford MP paid for a combined school and church in this remote wooded part of the parish of Fittleworth in 1880. The "somewhat understated" Gothic Revival red brick and stone building is now derelict: the school closed in 1925 and the church in 1959. | |
| Bexley Hill Mission Chapel | | Bexley Common; 51.0199°N 0.6981°W | Anglican | – | A preacher from nearby Henley Common Mission Hall founded a chapel in a disused cottage at Bexley Common in about 1900. It fell out of use after his death, but the building survives in ruinous condition. | |
| Binderton Chapel | | Binderton, West Dean; 50.8892°N 0.7922°W | Anglican | II | Now ruinous, this single-cell flint, brick and chalk chapel replaced Binderton's original parish church at the behest of the owner of Binderton House. His son Thomas Smythe (Note: Or Smyth. His father was also Thomas.) built it in the 1670s. It remained unconsecrated and fell out of religious use in the 18th century. | |
| Bosham United Reformed Church | | Bosham; 50.8310°N 0.8583°W | United Reformed Church | II | An oyster shed served as a chapel from 1812 until this "pleasant" (to Pevsner) Classical-style three-bay pedimented chapel was built in 1837. A schoolroom followed in 1875. The final service took place on 21 June 2005, and the brick and pebble-fronted building was sold. | |
| Broadbridge Congregational Chapel | | Broadbridge, Bosham; 50.8414°N 0.8454°W | Congregational | – | Built in the Edwardian era along with the surrounding houses in the Broadbridge area near Bosham railway station, this chapel—set back from the road behind houses—has been converted with minimal alteration into a cottage. | |
| St John the Evangelist's Church | | Chichester; 50.8354°N 0.7749°W | Anglican | I | James Elmes designed this proprietary chapel in 1812. It is a Classical-style octagonal preaching-house of pale brick whose interior resembles a Nonconformist chapel: the large pulpit and galleries are more prominent than the altar. The CCT look after the church, which became redundant in 1973. | |
| St Olave's Church (Note: Sometimes spelt St Olav.) | | Chichester; 50.8372°N 0.7787°W | Anglican | I | This small church in the northern quarter of the city centre underwent restoration in 1851 but is originally 11th-century with some 13th-century work (especially in the tiny, nearly square chancel). The 25 1/2-by-17 1/3-foot (7.8 m × 5.3 m) nave is topped with a steepled bell-turret. In the 1950s the church became a SPCK bookshop. The bookshop is now owned by the St Olav Trust, a charity made up of representatives from local churches, of all denominations. Although it serves as a bookshop the building is still a consecrated church. | |
| St Andrew-in-the-Oxmarket Church | | Chichester; 50.8366°N 0.7769°W | Anglican | II* | A "simple demure roughcast church" of the 13th century, hidden behind buildings along a narrow alley, this single-cell building has windows of a slightly later date and a bell-turret. Redundant since 1952, it is now a museum. | |
| Church of All Saints-in-the-Pallant | | Chichester; 50.8355°N 0.7786°W | Anglican | II | Called "as simple as a barn" by Pevsner, this single-cell 63 1/2-by-22 1/2-foot (19.4 m × 6.9 m) flint church is 13th-century with a Victorian vestry. Redundant since 1969, it was sold for office space in 2008. There is some Purbeck Marblework inside. | |
| St Bartholomew's Church | | Chichester; 50.8365°N 0.7862°W | Anglican | II | The circular St Sepulchre's Church was wrecked in 1642. George Draper built a Neoclassical replacement on the site 190 years later using stone and galleted flint. Macdonald Gill made changes in 1929, then the church became redundant in 1959 (at which point its benefice was united with that of St Paul's Church) and was used by a theological college. | |
| St Peter the Great's Church | | Chichester; 50.8370°N 0.7816°W | Anglican | II | Built for £5,650 to Richard Cromwell Carpenter's design in 1848–52, and highly regarded by Pevsner, this Gothic Revival stone church stands opposite the cathedral. A tower was planned, but a porch was built in 1881 instead. It was sold for commercial use and is now a bar. | |
| Eastgate Hall | | Chichester; 50.8357°N 0.7734°W | Baptist | II | Baptists worshipped on the site from 1671, but in 1728 the chapel was rebuilt in its present form: a stuccoed tile-clad building whose gable end was topped with round finials. Sold in 1954, when the congregation moved to a new church, it passed through various uses before becoming a Coral betting shop. | |
| Ebenezer Chapel | | Chichester; 50.8380°N 0.7771°W | Congregational | II | St Martin's Hall was recorded in 1741 as a stable, then a storeroom and warehouse. Seceders from another chapel converted it into an Independent place of worship in 1833, adding a Sunday School in 1857. After the congregations joined each other again, the stuccoed and gabled Gothic Revival building was incorporated into a hospital and later became a house. | |
| Zion Chapel | | Chichester; 50.8399°N 0.7821°W | Independent | – | Built in 1833 for Independents who had first met in 1822, this first fell out of use in 1878 when worshippers transferred to Providence Chapel. The stuccoed "minimal Gothic Revival" building then passed to The Salvation Army, who sold it in the early 21st century. It was extensively altered and is now Citadel House. | |
| Hornet Bible Christian Chapel | | Chichester; 50.8362°N 0.7720°W | Methodist | – | Between 1865 and 1907, George Draper's Gothic Revival flint and yellow-brick chapel was used by Bible Christians; then it was a United Methodist church until 1968. After closure it entered commercial use and is now a Chinese restaurant. For 30 years until 1835, Bible Christians used a building on Orchard Street. | |
| Greyfriars Chapel | | Chichester; 50.8392°N 0.7765°W | Pre-Reformation | I | The last remaining section of Chichester's former Franciscan friary is this church, built between 1269 and 1282 in an austere contemporary Gothic style. After the Dissolution of the Monasteries in the 1540s, it became the city's Guildhall; the 5th Duke of Richmond bought it in 1824, and it is now a museum and war memorial. | |
| Baffin's Hall | | Chichester; 50.8356°N 0.7761°W | Presbyterian | II | Built for Presbyterians and later used by Unitarians, Baffin's Hall is a red and grey brick chapel of 1721. The façade has two arched windows flanking a bricked-up arch and flanked in turn by projecting wings. After closure in 1930 it became an auction room. Its marriage registration was cancelled in September 1934. | |
| Dependants Chapel | | Chichester; 50.8392°N 0.7690°W | Society of Dependants | – | John Sirgood's localised Nonconformist sect, also known as Cokelers, established a chapel on this street-corner site in or before 1891. The stucco-clad building, in the Vernacular style, became a house after its closure in 1975. | |
| St Wilfrid's Chapel | | Church Norton, Selsey; 50.7549°N 0.7652°W | Anglican | I | Northeast of Selsey near the beach overlooking Pagham Harbour is the chancel of Selsey's former parish church. The rest of the building was moved to the village centre and became St Peter's Church. The old church is 13th-century and retains a Perpendicular Gothic east window. | |
| Cocking Congregational Chapel | | Cocking; 50.9493°N 0.7528°W | Congregational | – | This stone and red-brick building, which is now a house, dates in its present form from 1907 but was merely a rebuild of a 101-year-old Congregational chapel. | |
| St Peter's Church | | East Lavington (Note: The village is also known as Woolavington.); 50.9381°N 0.6547°W | Anglican | II* | After its redundancy in 1972, this plain Early English Gothic church became the private chapel of the adjacent Seaford College. The chancel arch, north aisle and its arcade are original, but there was a major Victorian restoration by G.E. Street. | |
| Church of the Assumption of St Mary the Virgin | | East Wittering; 50.7751°N 0.8637°W | Anglican | II* | A new church was built in the village centre in the 1950s, and this isolated 13th-century building was declared redundant in 1983. It was sold at auction for £191,000 in July 2021. It is 12th- and 13th-century and has a Norman doorway with chevron carving and elaborate capitals. | |
| Ebenezer Chapel | | Fernhurst; 51.0498°N 0.7255°W | Independent | – | This Vernacular-style local stone and brick chapel of 1852, built by a Mr Manfield, served Independents and Calvinistic Baptists who had seceded from an earlier Particular Baptist cause. Haslemere Strict Baptist Chapel administered it. | |
| Providence United Methodist Chapel | | Fernhurst; 51.0503°N 0.7261°W | Methodist | – | Providence Chapel, built in 1845, was used by Baptists and later (until about 1963) United Methodists before passing to the Exclusive Brethren. They moved to a new building in the village, and the lancet-windowed local stone and brick chapel became a house after the cancellation of its worship certification in March 1989. | |
| Funtington Congregational Chapel | | Funtington; 50.8661°N 0.8449°W | Congregational | – | This 200-capacity chapel dates from 1864 and incorporates stones from the original spire of Chichester Cathedral, which had collapsed in 1861. The building is now the Time Machine Fun Centre, a museum concerned with the science of time. | |
| St Michael's Church | | Hammer; 51.0835°N 0.7482°W | Anglican | – | This former church and church hall in Linchmere parish has been superseded by the other two churches in the parish, at Linchmere itself and in Camelsdale. | |
| Henley Mission Hall | | Henley Common; 51.0229°N 0.7265°W | Anglican | – | In 1884–85, Colonel Hollist and Lord Egmont sponsored the construction of this mission chapel to St Mary's Church at Easebourne, in the hamlet of Henley Common. Easebourne's vicar also left money in his will. The brick and tile structure is now a house. | |
| Pentecostal Mission Hall | | Hermitage, Southbourne; 50.8436°N 0.9275°W | Pentecostal | – | This metal hut was registered in accordance with the Places of Worship Registration Act 1855 as a mission chapel for Christians not otherwise designated. It is on the road leading to Thorney Island. It was used by a group of Pentecostal worshippers who originally met at a house on the same road. The building was acquired second-hand from Selsey, where it was in secular use, taken apart and transported to Hermitage, where it was rebuilt on a site where a footpath leaves Thorney Road. The operation cost £130.9s.9d. | |
| St Giles' Church | | Merston; 50.8163°N 0.7328°W | Anglican | I | The roof of this isolated marshland church became unsafe in 2010, so the church closed. The north aisle has such a low roof that there is no room for windows. The nave and chancel date from the 13th century; the arcade to the aisle may be contemporary. | |
| Ebenezer Chapel | | Midhurst; 50.9845°N 0.7416°W | Baptist | – | This opened in 1840 and was in continuous use until the Calvinistic cause failed in 1936. It passed into secular use in the 1950s. The Early English Gothic Revival chapel is of stone with red brickwork. | |
| Zion Chapel | | Midhurst; 50.9834°N 0.7446°W | Baptist | – | Opened on 12 September 1833, this was converted (with significant alteration) into a Masonic hall after the congregation stopped using it for worship in 1886. Locally important Baptist Benjamin Pewtress (d. 1854) is buried in a grave outside the chapel. The Classical-style pedimented building is of stucco-clad stone. | |
| St Francis of Assisi's Church | | Midhurst; 50.9860°N 0.7394°W | Roman Catholic | – | Charles Alban Buckler's sandstone-built Early English Gothic Revival church, with a bellcote at one end, was superseded by a new church in 1958, after which it became a restaurant. It stands on Rumbolds Hill in the town centre. | |
| Tuxlith Chapel | | Milland; 51.0478°N 0.8238°W | Anglican | II | Milland's old church was superseded by the larger St Luke's Church, built on an adjacent site in 1879. The old building, just one stone-walled room topped with a bell-cote, made a "telling contrast" to its "fussy" replacement, in Pevsner's words. After a long period of disuse, the building was rescued by the FFC charity. | |
| Dependants' Chapel | | Northchapel; 51.0540°N 0.6440°W | Society of Dependants | – | Along with Loxwood, Northchapel was the main centre of the localised Society of Dependants (Cokelers) sect. As well as this chapel, which was in use between 1870 and 1988, the community operated a cooperative shop in the village. The porch-fronted gabled chapel is set back behind houses on Petworth Road, and is of Petworth stone and brick. | |
| Nutbourne Bible Christian Chapel | | Nutbourne; 50.8434°N 0.8839°W | Methodist | – | A Bible Christian cause formed in this village in 1841, but this chapel was not built until 1905. After the Methodist mergers of the 20th century, it joined the Methodist Church of Great Britain, and continued thus until its closure and conversion into a commercial building. It has flint and brick walls and lancet windows. | |
| Chapel of the Holy Nativity | | Nutbourne; 50.8434°N 0.8961°W | Roman Catholic | – | A Mass Centre linked to St Richard's Church at Chichester was founded in a barn on Farm Lane in Nutbourne. It closed after a permanent church opened at nearby Bosham; stained glass windows and internal fittings were transferred there. The building is now part of the Catholic Bible School complex. Its marriage registration was not cancelled until 2006. | |
| Ebenezer Chapel | | Petworth; 50.9869°N 0.6101°W | Baptist | – | Built of brick in 1887, originally for Independents, this small Strict Baptist chapel was aligned with the Gospel Standard movement. It closed in November 2006 after the congregation reduced to one person, and two years later residential conversion was announced. Its registration for marriages was not formally cancelled until March 2017. | |
| Petworth Congregational Chapel | | Petworth; 50.9873°N 0.6087°W | Congregational | II | In use from 1819 until 1849, after which a new chapel (still in use) was built on Golden Square, this yellow-brick Classical-style building has been altered while in secular use but retains parts of a pediment, tall arched windows and a rusticated entrance porch. | |
| Plaistow Mission Hall | | Plaistow; 51.0660°N 0.5670°W | Baptist | – | Henry Cowan MP built this stone, flint and brick mission chapel in 1907. It was converted into a house in 2000, then rebuilt in a distinctive Modernist style in 2010, winning local and national architectural awards. | |
| All Saints Church | | Portfield, Chichester; 50.8404°N 0.7569°W | Anglican | – | Situated opposite Chichester cemetery down a rural lane, this flint and stone Gothic Revival church was designed in 1869–71 by Henry Woodyer. The tall chancel has an apsidal end, and a Lady chapel was built in 1915. It was declared redundant in 1981. After closure, the church became a museum of dolls and mechanical musical instruments. | |
| Rake Mission Church | | Rake; 51.0422°N 0.8587°W | Anglican | – | This was built in 1879 as a mission chapel to St Luke's Church at Milland, which was granted parish status two years earlier. The turret-topped Early English Gothic Revival red-brick building, now a house, was by George Edmund Street. | |
| Gospel Hall | | Rogate; 51.0137°N 0.8412°W | Brethren | – | This former Gospel Hall, on Fyning Lane near the hamlet of Fyning in Rogate parish, now houses an architectural services company. | |
| St Mary's Church | | Rumboldswyke, Chichester; 50.8300°N 0.7664°W | Anglican | II* | Now the headquarters of HMDW Architects, the old parish church of Rumboldswyke was in use from the 11th century until its redundancy in July 1994. A simple nave and chancel are divided by a bulky arch with no mouldings. Lancet windows were added in the 13th century. | |
| Sidlesham Wesleyan Chapel | | Sidlesham; 50.7700°N 0.7851°W | Methodist | – | Sidlesham's first Wesleyan chapel dated from 1824. James Clayton, who is commemorated on a stone outside, rebuilt it in 1878 in a Gothic Revival style with lancet windows and flint, brick and stonework. It became a house in the 1980s after its closure at the start of that decade. Its marriage registration, granted in 1906, was cancelled in 1986. | |
| Earnley Tabernacle | | Somerley, Earnley; 50.7780°N 0.8436°W | Methodist | – | Situated at the north end of Earnley parish, this Methodist chapel served the community from 1839—a date prominently displayed on the stone in its gable—until the late 20th century, but it was ruinous by 1980. Now refitted as a house, its flint and red-brick walls and arched windows have been fully restored. | |
| Old Meeting House | | South Harting; 50.9688°N 0.8781°W | Independent | – | Founded for an Independent Congregational group in 1800, this building was extended in 1828 but later fell out of religious use: a new chapel opened in the village in 1871. It is a Vernacular-style clunch-built structure with some brickwork. | |
| Harting Primitive Methodist Chapel | | South Harting; 50.9701°N 0.8807°W | Methodist | – | Now the Shaxson Memorial Hall, this was built for Primitive Methodists in 1872. Gothic Revival in style and with stone-dressed red-brick walls, it has cross-gables to the sides. | |
| St Mary's Church | | Treyford; 50.9617°N 0.8276°W | Anglican | II* | Benjamin Ferrey's new church for this rural area, completed in 1849 (but since closed and destroyed), rendered this 13th-century church obsolete, and it fell into dereliction. Most of the exterior walls remain next to a farmyard in a thickly wooded area. | |
| Primitive Methodist Chapel | | Walderton; 50.8898°N 0.8788°W | Methodist | – | Primitive Methodists, and latterly the Methodist Church of Great Britain, used this building for worship until 1958, after which it became a house. It dates from the 1860s, has bargeboards and is Vernacular in style. | |
| St Mary Magdalene's Church | | West Lavington; 50.9774°N 0.7313°W | Anglican | II* | Expensive repairs and a dwindling congregation forced this church near Midhurst to close in 2009, and it was declared redundant. William Butterfield's Gothic Revival stone church dates from 1850 and has a rood screen of Sussex Marble. | |
| West Marden Evangelical Chapel | | West Marden; 50.9164°N 0.9055°W | Evangelical | – | A mission room was founded in this village in the parish of Compton, and was financially provided for by the will of the parish church's incumbent in 1901. It was later registered as an Evangelical place of worship. | |
| Bethesda Chapel | | West Wittering; 50.7860°N 0.8716°W | Methodist | – | This stands on Chapel Lane outside the village. In its original form it dates from 1811, but an extension was built in 1858. The stone building is now a house, but it retains its stone date plaque. It was registered for marriages in March 1948 and formally deregistered in March 2017. | |
| Salvation Army Hall | | Westbourne; 50.8595°N 0.9292°W | Salvation Army | – | A building on the site was registered as a Free church between 1912 and 1948, and was later re-registered for worship by The Salvation Army. A new building was put up and licensed accordingly in 1968. | |
| Congregational Mission Church | | Wisborough Green; 51.0222°N 0.5109°W | Congregational | – | Now a house with the name Old Church, this 120-capacity chapel dates from 1909. It is constructed of red brick with some tiles. | |

== See also ==
- Grade I listed buildings in West Sussex
- List of current places of worship in Chichester (district)
- List of demolished places of worship in West Sussex

== Bibliography ==
- Chambers, Ralph (1953). The Strict Baptist Chapels of England: Sussex. Vol. 2. Thornton Heath: Ralph Chambers.
- Coppin, Paul (2006). 101 Medieval Churches of West Sussex. Seaford: S.B. Publications. ISBN 1-85770-306-5.
- Elleray, D. Robert (1981). The Victorian Churches of Sussex. Chichester: Phillimore & Co. Ltd. ISBN 0-85033-378-4.
- Elleray, D. Robert (2004). Sussex Places of Worship. Worthing: Optimus Books. ISBN 0-9533132-7-1.
- Homan, Roger (1984). The Victorian Churches of Kent. Chichester: Phillimore & Co. Ltd. ISBN 0-85033-466-7.
- Homan, Roger (1997). "Mission and Fission: the organization of Huntingtonian and Calvinistic Baptist causes in Sussex in the 18th and 19th centuries". Sussex Archaeological Collections. 135. Lewes: Sussex Archaeological Society: 265–282. doi:10.5284/1085045. ISSN 0143-8204.
- Lines, Wendy (2002). Billingshurst and Wisborough Green. Images of England. Stroud: Tempus Publishing. ISBN 0-7524-2482-3.
- Morgan, Roy R. (1992). Chichester: A Documentary History. Chichester: Phillimore & Co. Ltd. ISBN 0-85033-851-4.
- Nairn, Ian; Pevsner, Nikolaus (1965). The Buildings of England: Sussex. Harmondsworth: Penguin Books. ISBN 0-14-071028-0.
- Rudkin, David J. (1974). The Hermitage and The Slipper. Westbourne: David J. Rudkin.
- St Olav Christian Bookshop (2026). "About us".
- Stell, Christopher (2002). Nonconformist Chapels and Meeting-houses in Eastern England. Swindon: English Heritage. ISBN 1-873592-50-7.
- Swinfen, Warden; Arscott, David (1984). Hidden Sussex. Brighton: BBC Radio Sussex. ISBN 0-9509510-0-5.
- Wales, Tony (1999). The West Sussex Village Book. Newbury: Countryside Books. ISBN 1-85306-581-1.
