= Hubert Bennett (architect) =

British architect

Sir Hubert Bennett, FRIBA (4 September 1909 – 13 December 2000) was a British architect.

Bennett was born in Lancashire, where his father was surveyor and architect to the Duke of Bridgewater's estate. He qualified at Manchester School of Architecture, and taught and worked in Leeds. In 1943 he became the chief architect of Southampton and in 1945 he became the county architect of the West Riding of Yorkshire, where he designed many schools and housing developments.

He was Architect to the Greater London Council (formerly the London County Council) and Superintending Architect of Metropolitan Buildings from 1956 to 1971, succeeding Sir Leslie Martin.

In that role, he oversaw many controversial post-war housing projects in London. He was knighted in 1970.

== Selected works ==
- Keighley Technical College (1955-56)
- Hammersmith flyover, West London (1961)
- Draper House, Elephant and Castle, London (1965)
- (with Jack Whittle) Queen Elizabeth Hall and Purcell Room, London (1967)
- (with Jack Whittle) Hayward Gallery, London (1968)
- (with François Druet) Palais des Festivals et des Congrès, Cannes, France (1982)
- Altar of Tuxlith Chapel, Milland, West Sussex (1990s)

== Sources ==
- "Sir Hubert Bennett" obituary, The Times, 15 December 2020.
- Profile, ukwhoswho.com. Accessed 24 January 2023.
