= Portus (disambiguation) =

Portus (which means "harbour" in Latin) may refer to Portus, a harbour of ancient Rome and an archaeological site.

It may also refer to:

== People ==
- Franciscus Portus (1511 – 1581), Greek-Italian classical scholar
- Portus Baxter (1806 – 1868), American politician
- Alexander Portus (1834 – 1905), Australian engineer and politician
- G. V. Portus (1883 – 1954), Australian academic
- William Portus Cullen (1855 – 1935), Australian chief justice and politician
- Leocán Portus (1923 – 2006), Chilean politician

== Places ==
- El Portús, Cartagena, Spain; a beach

Various Roman ports

- Portus, at the mouth of the Tiber, Italy
- Portus Adurni, modern Portchester, England
- Portus Cale, modern Porto, Portugal
- Portus Dubris, modern Dover, England
- Itius Portus, perhaps Boulogne or Wissant, France
- Portus Julius, near Naples, Italy

== See also ==
- Portus Mercatorum, a literal rendering of the Latin name for Copenhagen (a rare alternative to the city's standard Latin name, which is the loanword Hafnia)
- Portus Mariae, a literal rendering of the Latin name for Mariehamn
- Portus Magnus (disambiguation)
- Port (disambiguation)
- Portius
