= Murder of Valerie Graves =

2013 murder in the United Kingdom

Coordinates: 50.81164°N 0.84854°W

Valerie Graves
- Born: 25 December 1958
- Died: 29 or 30 December 2013 (aged 55); Bosham, West Sussex, England
- Cause of death: Murder by bludgeoning

Valerie Graves (25 December 1958 – 29/30 December 2013) was an artist and grandmother who was murdered in December 2013 in Bosham, West Sussex, England.

== Life ==
Graves had two adult children and had owned a gallery and craft studio in Roxburghshire, having lived in Scotland for ten years. She had moved to Bracklesham Bay not long before the murder to look after her then 87-year-old mother Eileen.

== Christmas 2013 ==
Eileen, Valerie, her sister Janet, and Janet's partner, Nigel, were housesitting in Smugglers Lane, Bosham, for friends who were out of the country at the time. Several members of her family and friends visited the house over this time and enjoyed both the Christmas celebrations and Valerie's birthday, which was on Christmas Day.

=== Murder ===
On the morning of 30 December, Janet found Graves's body in her bedroom, having suffered severe head and facial injuries. A patio door, leading directly from the bedroom outside to the back of the premises, was found to be unlocked.

== Investigation ==
A few days after the murder, a hammer was found by police at the entrance to the driveway of Harts' Farm on Hoe Lane, some 600m from the murder scene. The hammer was confirmed to be the murder weapon. A local man was arrested on 14 January 2014 and questioned about the murder, but was bailed and released without further action.

In November 2014, a partial DNA profile for the suspect was obtained. In January 2015, Sussex Police began a voluntary mass DNA screening programme in Bosham, asking men aged 17 and over to give samples. At the time, officers had interviewed 9,500 people in relation to the case, a reward of £20,000 had been offered and the murder had been featured on Crimewatch.

In July 2019 Cristian Sabău was arrested in his home in Dej, Romania on a European Arrest Warrant. Sussex Police sought his extradition. He appeared in court in Cluj-Napoca.

He was extradited to the UK and was scheduled to appear before Brighton Magistrates' court on 20 July 2019. He was remanded in custody with a further court appearance scheduled for 30 September.

== Conviction ==
In November 2019 Sabău was convicted of her murder after pleading guilty. The prosecutor said that Sabău had entered the house with the intent to burgle it, expecting it to be empty. He had been told that a safe in the house contained a large amount of cash and ingots. He had previously done odd jobs for the owners. When he encountered Valerie Graves he attacked her with a hammer, leaving injuries that the prosecution compared to those sustained in traffic accidents. Judge Christine Laing jailed him for life with a minimum term of 23 years and 272 days.

== Television ==
The murder was the subject of the Sky documentary series Killer in My Village (Season 4, Episode 8). It has also been featured in the series "Donald MacIntyre: Unsolved".
