= Timothy Darvill =

English archaeologist and author (1957–2024)

- Born: 22 December 1957; Cheltenham, England, United Kingdom
- Died: 5 October 2024 (aged 66)
- Education: University of Southampton (PhD)
- Spouse: Caoimhe Irvine (m. 2024)

Timothy Darvill OBE FSA (22 December 1957 – 5 October 2024) was an English archaeologist and author, best known for his publications on prehistoric Britain and his excavations in England, Wales, and the Isle of Man. He was Professor of Archaeology in the Faculty of Science and Technology Bournemouth University in England. In April 2008, he co-directed excavations within Stonehenge, together with Geoffrey Wainwright and Miles Russell, to examine the early stone structures on the site. The work featured heavily in a BBC Timewatch programme which examined the theory that Stonehenge was a prehistoric centre of healing. He was appointed Officer of the Order of the British Empire (OBE) in the 2010 Queen's Birthday Honours for services to archaeology.

== Career ==
After completing a PhD at Southampton University on the Neolithic of Wales and the west of England, he worked for the Western Archaeological Trust and the Council for British Archaeology before establishing a private practice offering consultancy services in the field of archaeological resource management. He was appointed to the Chair of Archaeology in the newly established archaeology group at Bournemouth Polytechnic (now Bournemouth University) in October 1991 and between 2007 and 2010 was Director of the Centre for Archaeology, Anthropology and Heritage. The author of over twenty books and more than 200 papers and articles, he served as Chairman of the Institute of Field Archaeologists, vice-president of the Society of Antiquaries of London, and was a Member of the Council of the National Trust. At the time of his death he was chairman of the board of directors of Cotswold Archaeology and a vice-president of the Royal Archaeological Institute. His research interests focused on archaeological resource management and the Neolithic of northwest Europe.

Darvill was elected as a fellow of the Society of Antiquaries of London in 1988.

== Personal life and death ==
Darvill was born on 22 December 1957 and raised in the Cotswolds and contributed to the local archaeology scene, including being chairman of Cotswold Archaeology. He was a guitarist and played in a band called the Standing Stones.

In 2024, Darvill married his partner, fellow archaeologist, Caoimhe Darvill, nee. Irvine. They met at Bournemouth University in 2020.

Darvill died from cancer on 5 October 2024, at the age of 66.

== Bibliography ==
- Darvill, T. C.; M. Parker Pearson; R. Smith & R. Thomas, eds. (1978). New approaches to our past : an archaeological forum : conference proceedings. Southampton: Southampton University Archaeological Society.
- Megalithic Chambered Tombs of the Cotswold Severn Region (Vorda, 1982)
- Prehistoric Gloucestershire (Alan Sutton, 1987)
- Ancient Monuments in the Countryside (English Heritage, 1987)
- Prehistoric Britain (Batsford, 1987; Yale University Press 1987; Routledge 1996)
- Cirencester: town and landscape (with Christopher Gerrard. Cotswold Archaeological Trust, 1994)
- Planning for the Past: an assessment of archaeological assessments 1982–91 (with Stephen Burrow and Deborah-Anne Wildgust. English Heritage, 1995)
- Prehistoric Britain from the Air (Cambridge University Press, 1996)
- Neolithic Houses in Northwest Europe and Beyond (edited with Julian Thomas. Oxbow Books, 1996)
- Making English Landscapes (edited with Katherine Barker. Oxbow Books, 1997)
- MARS: The Monuments at Risk Survey of England 1995 (with Andrew Fulton. Bournemouth University and English Heritage 1998)
- The Cerne Giant: an antiquity on trial (with Katherine Barker, Barbara Bender, and Ronald Hutton. Oxbow Books, 1999)
- Prehistory: a teacher’s guide (with Mike Corbishley and Peter Stone. English Heritage, 2000)
- Anglo-Russian Archaeology Seminar: recording systems for archaeological projects (edited with Gennadii Afanas’ev and Eileen Wilkes. Bournemouth University and the Institute of Archaeology, Russian Academy of Sciences, Moscow, 2000) ISBN 1-85899-104-8
- One Land, Many Landscapes (edited with Martin Gojda. British Archaeological Reports International Series, 2001)
- Neolithic Enclosures in Atlantic Northwest Europe (edited with Julian Thomas. Oxbow Books, 2001)
- The Archaeology of the Uplands (CBA and Royal Commission on the Historic Monuments of England, 1986)
- Concise Oxford Dictionary of Archaeology (Oxford University Press, 2002)
  - --do.-- Second edition. 2008
- Oxford Guide to Archaeological Sites in England (with Paul Stamper and Jane Timby. Oxford University Press, 2002)
- Megaliths from Antiquity (Antiquity Papers 3. Edited with Caroline Malone. Antiquity Publications, Cambridge, 2003)
- The Long Barrows of the Cotswolds and Surrounding Areas (Tempus, 2004)
- Heritage of Value: archaeology of renown (edited with Clay Mathers and Barbara Little. University Press of Florida, 2005)
- Stonehenge World Heritage Site: an archaeological research framework (English Heritage and Bournemouth University, 2005)
- Stonehenge: the biography of a landscape (Tempus, 2006)
- Prehistoric Britain (Routledge, 2010)
- "Mythical rings? Waun Mawn and Stonehenge Stage 1". Antiquity. 96 (390): 1515–1529. December 2022. doi:10.15184/aqy.2022.82.
