= Bosham Head =

Part of a Roman statue found in England

Coordinates: 50.8374°N 0.7813°W

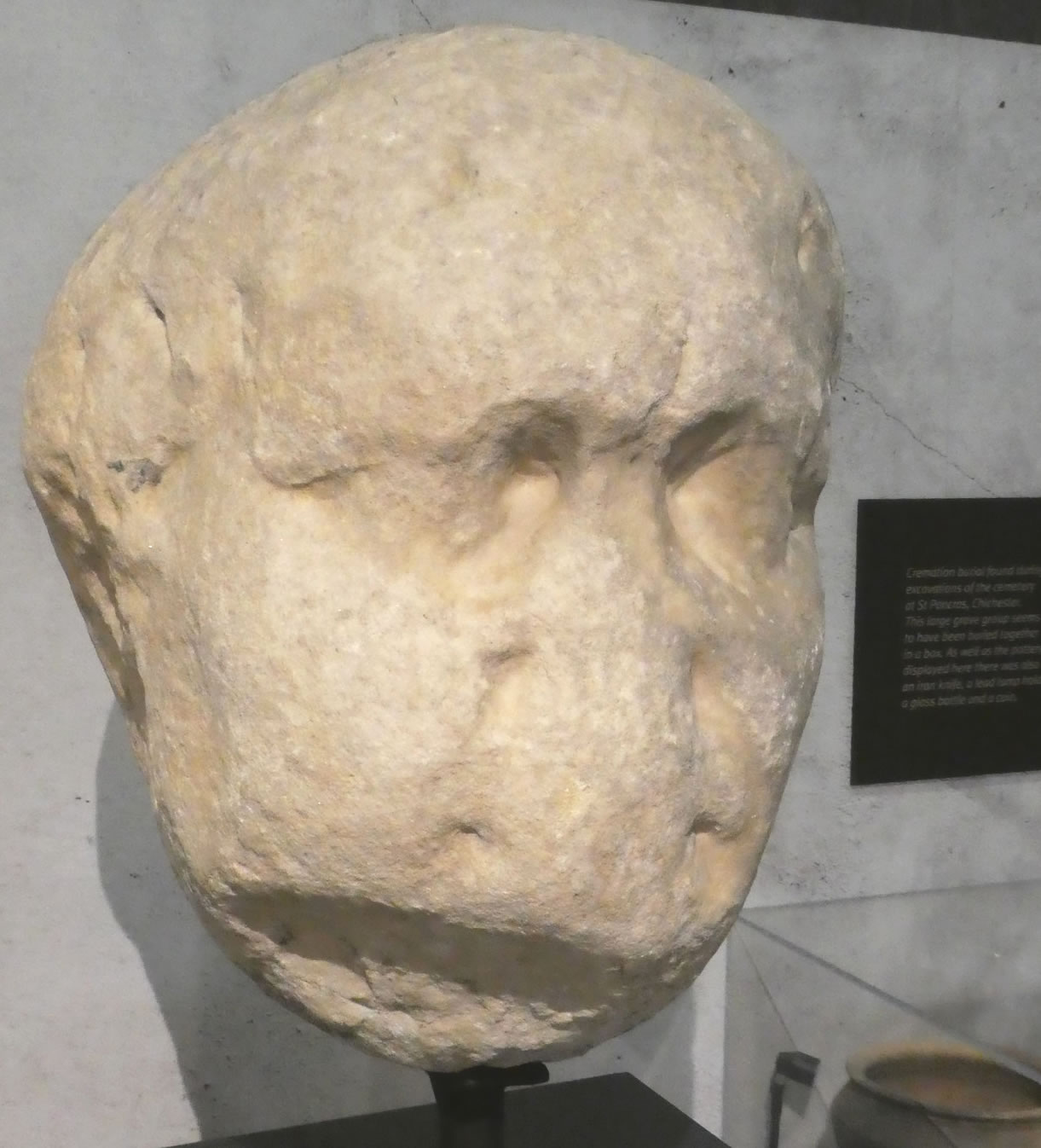
- Artist: Unknown
- Year: AD 121–122
- Medium: Stone
- Condition: Poor
- Location: The Novium; Chichester

The Bosham Head is part of the largest Roman statue found in Britain, a large (50cm high), 375-pound (170 kg) sculpted piece of stone that was discovered in Bosham, near Chichester, around 1800. It later resided for some time in the garden of the Bishop of Chichester's palace before being exhibited in the Chichester Museum where it now stands.

In 2013, 3D laser scans led Dr Miles Russell and Harry Manley of Bournemouth University to conclude that enough survived to suggest that the head was that of a lost sculpture of Emperor Trajan (53–117), perhaps erected by Hadrian at the mouth of Chichester Harbour.

== See also ==
York Head
