= Portus Magnus =

A number of Roman ports were known as portus magnus (Latin: grand port):

- Portus Magnus, Spain: modern Portmán
- Portus Magnus, Spain: modern Almería
- Portus Magnus, Algeria: modern Bethioua
- Portus Magnus, Egypt: modern Alexandria Port
- Portus Magnus (Mauretania), in the Roman province of Mauretania Caesariensis
- Magnus Portus: modern Bosham, near Chichester, England

== See also ==
- Portus Augusti
- Portus Divinus
- Portus (disambiguation)
- Magnus (disambiguation)
