= St Andrew-in-the-Oxmarket Church =

Arts centre and former church in Chichester, England

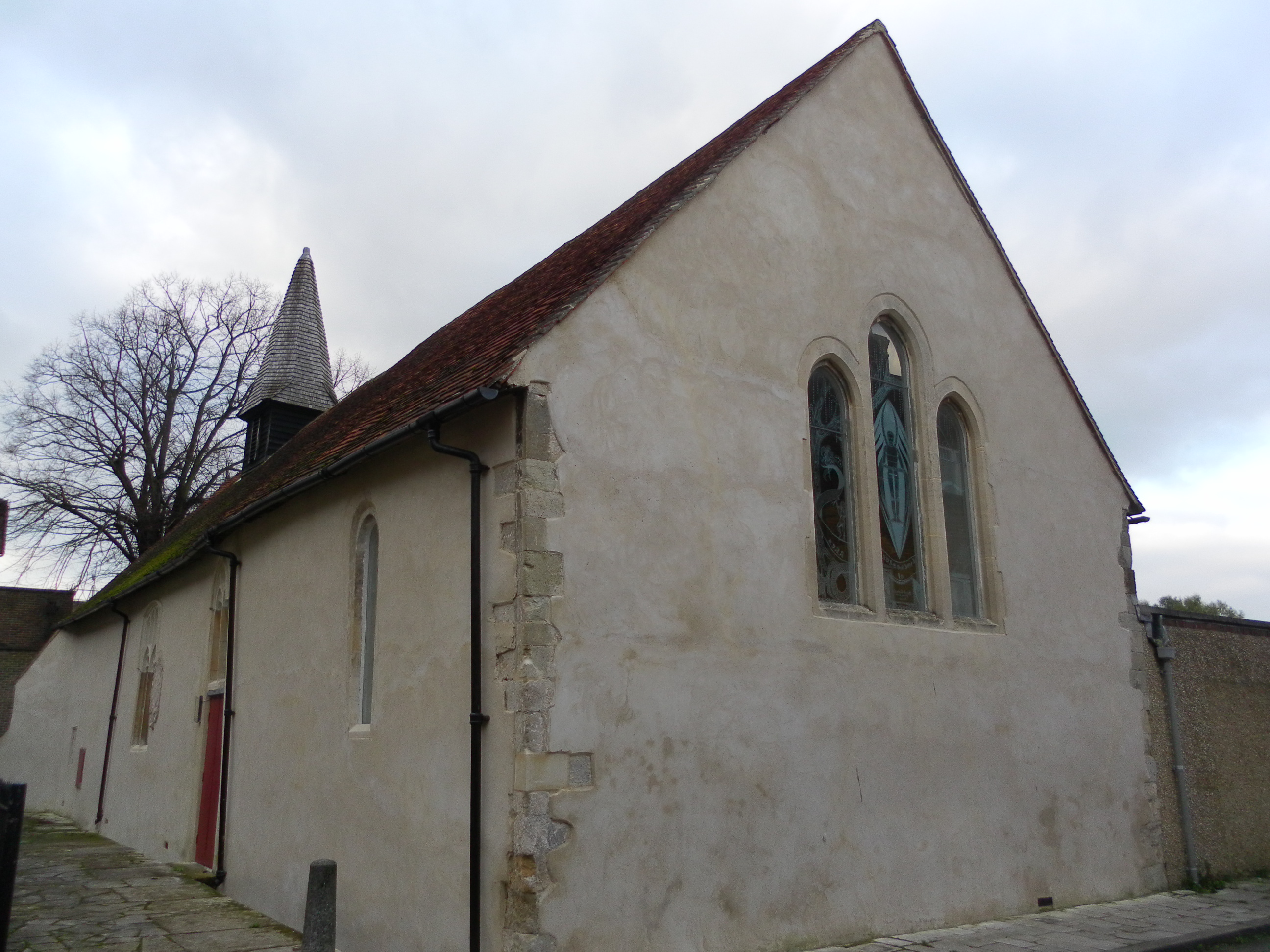
- St Andrew-in-the-Oxmarket Church in 2012.
- Interactive map of the St Andrew-in-the-Oxmarket Church area

General information
- Location: St Andrew's Court, East Street, Chichester, England
- Coordinates: 50.8366°N 0.7768°W
- Current tenants: Oxmarket Centre of Arts
- Construction started: 13th century

St Andrew-in-the-Oxmarket Church (later known as the Chichester Centre of Arts and the Oxmarket Centre of Arts) is a former Anglican church in the centre of the cathedral city of Chichester in West Sussex, England. The building has existed since the 13th century and was used as a church from then until the mid 20th century, when wartime damage forced it to close. It is now an arts centre, having been converted in 1976 and extended 13 years later. Historic England has listed the building at Grade II* for its architectural and historical importance.

== History ==
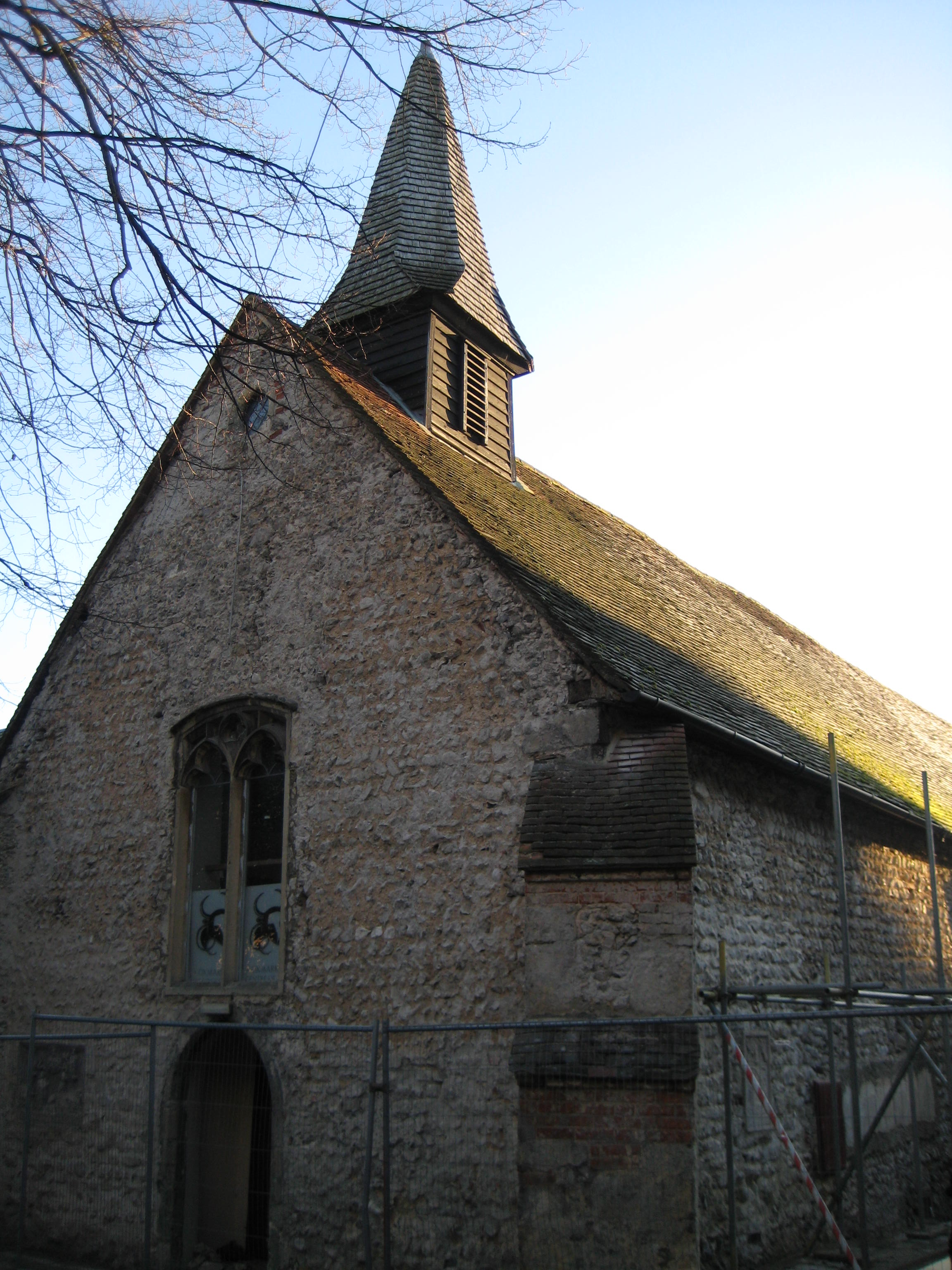
St Andrew-in-the-Oxmarket Church in 2010.

St Andrew-in-the-Oxmarket Church existed as a chapel in the 13th century. It is situated near East Street in central Chichester, accessible only by way of two alleyways. Historically, the church was the property of the Dean of Chichester, and the church owned much land in the area until the Reformation.

Additions to the church were made in the 14th, 15th and 19th centuries. The north window of the church depicts Saint Cecilia, and the south window of the church has a tribute to poet William Collins, who is buried in the church. The church used to house a portrait of William Cawley, though this been moved to Chichester Cathedral.

In 1878, the parish of All Saints-in-the-Pallant—a former church which was also built in the 13th-century— was merged into the St Andrew-in-the-Oxmarket parish. In 1943, during the Second World War, St Andrew-in-the-Oxmarket Church was badly damaged by bombing. The congregation of St Andrew-in-the-Oxmarket moved into the unused All Saints-in-the-Pallant church. The church was deconsecrated in the 1950s, by which time it was disused and empty. In the 1960s, Archdeacon of Chichester Lancelot Mason proposed turning the church into an art gallery as Chichester had no art galleries at the time. Between 1971 and 1976, the building was restored and converted from a church into an arts centre. In 1976, the church opened as the Chichester Centre of Arts, which was later renamed to the Oxmarket Centre of Arts. In 1989, the church was extended using rubble stone. In 2020, planning permission was given for more renovations to be made to the building in order to modernise it.

St Andrew-in-the-Oxmarket Church is a Grade II* listed building. A wall to the north of the church is also Grade II listed. The church is open to the public, and multiple artworks are on display there.

== Architecture ==
The church, a small building which "in scale [is] exactly like churches in nearby villages", is built of stone and flint. The outside walls are rendered apart from at the east end, where the quoins are of stone dressed with ashlar, and the west end which is supported by substantial buttresses. The stonework which has been obscured by render includes some reused fragments of herringbone pattern work of the Norman era and rubble taken from the demolished Roman walls around the city centre. The windows, all lancets, vary in date from 13th- to 19th-century; the three-light east window dates from the latter. The doorway at the west end is 14th-century. On the roof is a weatherboarded bell-cot topped with a short broach spire.

Inside, the plan is simple: a nave and chancel with no chancel arch or structural division. There is a wooden gallery, and the timber roof is 19th-century. The extension of 1989 was designed by architect Peter Fleming and consists of a two-bay projection with glazed gables, built onto the north wall.

== See also ==
- Grade II* listed buildings in West Sussex
- List of former places of worship in Chichester District
