= Purcell Room =

Concert and performance venue in London, England

Coordinates: 51.5065°N 0.1159°W

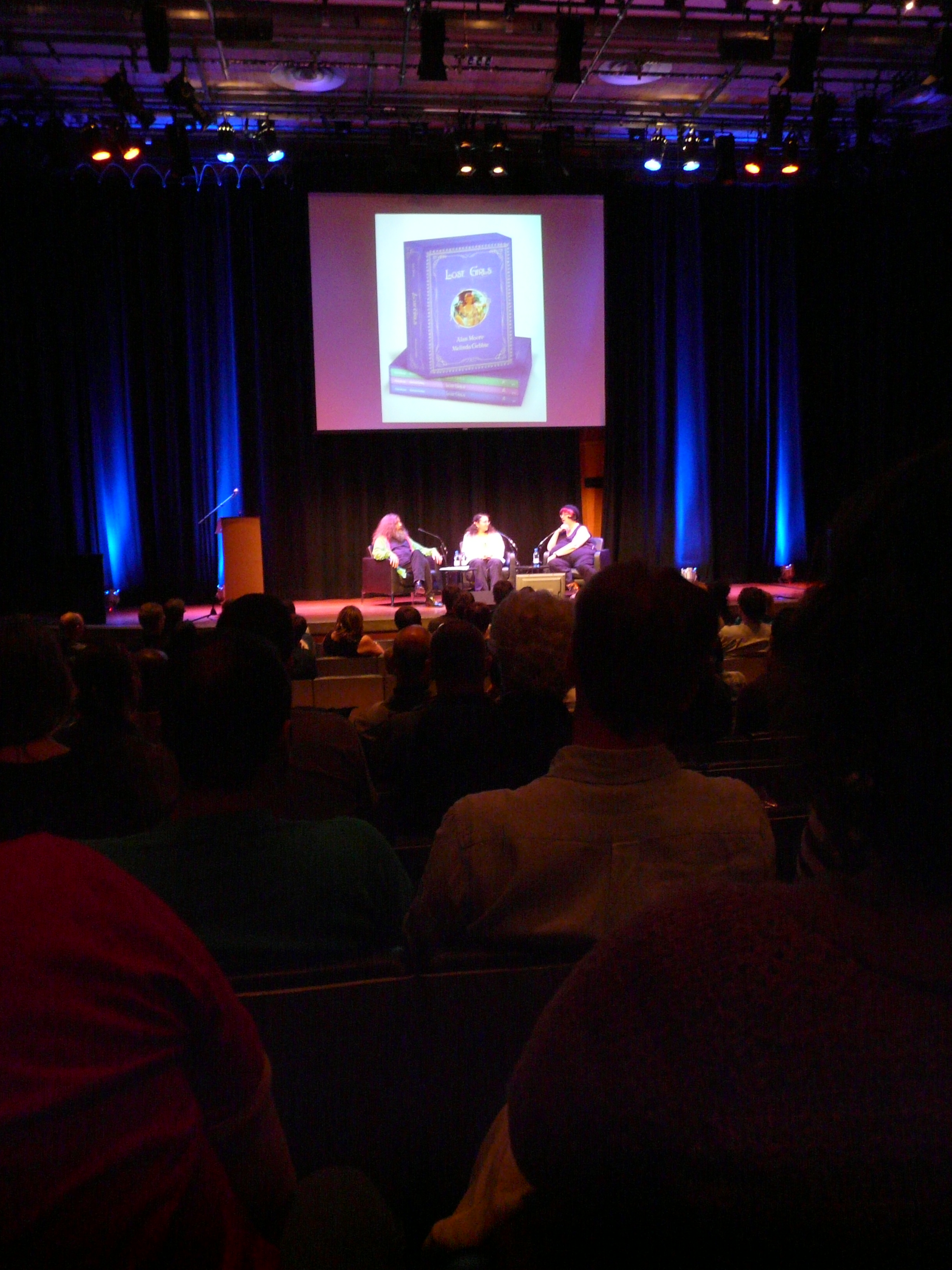
London Literature Festival, 2008

The Purcell Room is a concert and performance venue which forms part of the Southbank Centre, one of Central London's leading cultural complexes. It is named after the 17th century English composer Henry Purcell and has 370 seats. The Purcell Room has hosted a wide range of chamber music, jazz, mime and poetry recitals. In the context of the Southbank Centre it is the smallest of a set of three venues, the other two being the Royal Festival Hall, a large symphony hall, and the Queen Elizabeth Hall (QEH), which is used for orchestral, chamber and contemporary amplified music.

The Purcell Room was built at the same time as the Queen Elizabeth Hall, with which it shared a common foyer building and architectural features as an example of Brutalist architecture. The focus of the building is its interior space and it makes few concessions to external decoration. From outside, even its position within Southbank Centre is not easy to discern. The Queen Elizabeth Hall and Purcell Room were designed, with The Hayward, as additions to the Southbank Centre arts complex by Hubert Bennett, head of the architects department of the Greater London Council, with Jack Whittle, F.G West and Geoffrey Horsefall.

The venue was temporarily closed in September 2015, for major renovations, and re-opened in 2018.

== Architecture ==
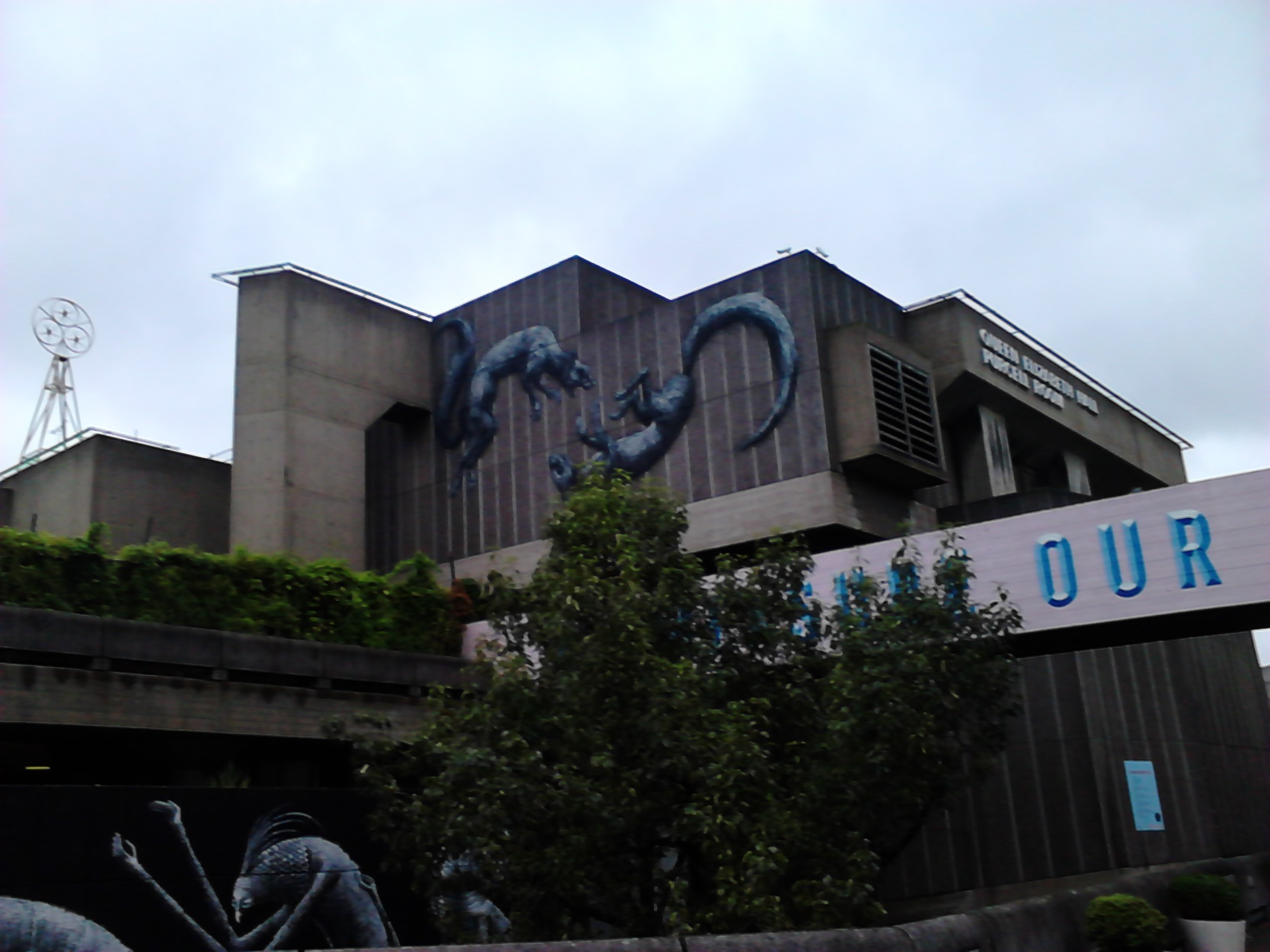
Purcell Room auditorium, foyer and high level bridge to The Hayward

The Purcell Room stands between the Queen Elizabeth Hall (QEH) auditorium and The Hayward, aligned parallel to Waterloo Bridge, with the stage backing on to the side of the QEH auditorium (the north-west end). The auditorium is cantilevered out over the centre access road and its rear façade faces the entrance to The Hayward. The auditorium is reported to be fitted with a Helmholtz resonator to allow its acoustic properties to be modified.

The access link from the foyer building (shared with the QEH) is through a massive sculpted concrete casing, visible from outside the entrance to The Hayward, near the overhead bridge. The artists' foyer is between the Purcell Room and QEH auditoriums at ground level.

The treatment of the ventilation services is an early example of the external treatment of such equipment. This idea later reached a peak in the Centre Georges Pompidou in Paris and Lloyd's building in London in the 1970s and 80s respectively.

The roof of the building, which is supported independently of the auditorium, holds the plant room for both the QEH and the Purcell Room. The plant room's three massive vents are housed high above the walkway near the entrance to the Hayward and also towards the Waterloo Bridge side of the north corner of the roof. Large concrete ducts lead from the plant room: vertically to the foyer building below via the mysterious concrete tower, and horizontally to the QEH auditorium.
