= Bosham Hoe =

Village in West Sussex, England

Coordinates: 50.809°N 0.847°W

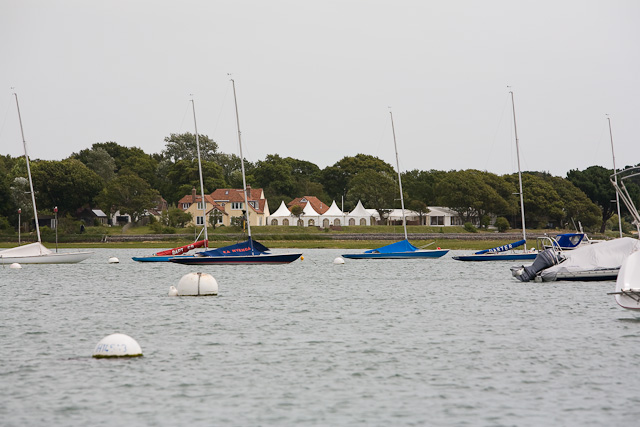
A house in Bosham Hoe

Bosham Hoe is a hamlet and private estate on the shore of Chichester Harbour in the English county of West Sussex. It is some two kilometres south of the village of Bosham (where the population at the 2011 Census was included).

In 2007 the estate had the second highest house prices in Sussex.
