= Tuxlith Chapel =

- Milland Old Church
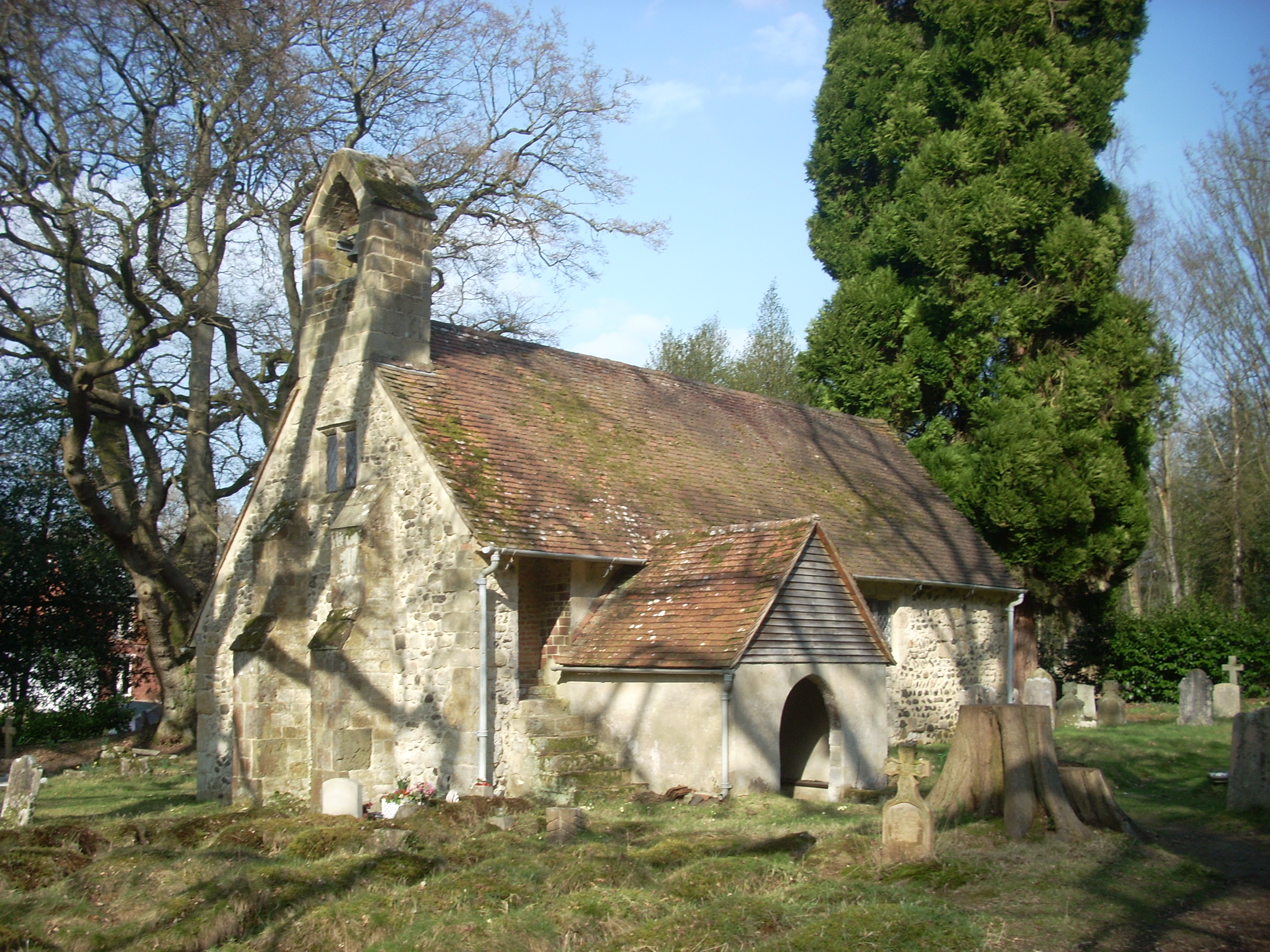
- Tuxlith Chapel

- Location in West Sussex
- 51.0478°N 0.8238°W
- OS grid reference: SU 825 282
- Location: Milland, West Sussex
- Country: England
- Denomination: Anglican
- Website: Friends of Friendless Churches

Architecture
- Functional status: Redundant
- Heritage designation: Grade II
- Designated: 18 June 1959
- Architectural type: Church
- Style: Gothic
- Completed: 18th century
- Closed: 1879

Specifications
- Materials: Plastered stone rubble with ashlar dressings, tiled roof

Tuxlith Chapel, also known as Milland Old Church, is a redundant Anglican church in the village of Milland, West Sussex, England (grid reference SU 825 282). It is recorded in the National Heritage List for England as a designated Grade II listed building, and is under the care of the Friends of Friendless Churches.

== History ==
It has been stated that the church was built as a chapel of ease to St George, Trotton, in the 16th century. However, there must have been an earlier building on the site because during conservation work a blocked window dating from the 12th century, and herringbone masonry in the north wall in Norman style were found. The earliest surviving documentary evidence relating to the church is a bequest in a will dated 1532 to "the Church of Tyklyth". The parish registers go back to 1581. In the 17th century a gallery was added, approached by steps from outside the church. During the following century a north transept was built. However, during the 19th century, due to growth of the local population, the building became too small for the size of the congregation, and a new church dedicated to St Luke was built to the west of it in 1879.

The old church was used as a Sunday school until the 1930s, when it became unused and its fabric deteriorated. It was listed as Grade II listed building in 1959, at which time it was described as being "disused and neglected". The church was declared redundant in 1974. It was one of the first churches to be owned by the charity, the Friends of Friendless Churches. At that time the charity was only a pressure group, but its constitution was changed so that it could instigate repair and renovation of the churches in its possession. The charity holds a 99-year lease with effect from 1 January 1974. After its acquisition the building was immediately made waterproof. Money has since been raised for further restoration work, helped by the Friends of Tuxlith Chapel, a group founded in 1993. It is now used as a community centre, and it hosts concerts and meetings. Improvements to the furniture of the church have been undertaken, including restoration of the pulpit in 1993, and a new altar designed by Sir Hubert Bennett.

== Architecture ==
Tuxlith Chapel is constructed in plastered stone rubble with ashlar dressings and has a tiled roof. Its plan is L-shaped, consisting of a chancel with a north transept and a north porch, and a nave with a south porch. On the south wall are stone steps which led up to the former gallery. On the west gable is a bellcote. On the sides of the east window are Commandment Boards containing the Creed and the Lord's Prayer.

Contrasting it favourably with St Luke's Church, its 19th-century replacement, architectural historian Nikolaus Pevsner described it as making "a very telling contrast between true piety and 19th-century religious advertisement".

== See also ==
- List of former places of worship in Chichester (district)
