= Old Town Hall, Bosham =

Municipal building in Bosham, West Sussex, England

Old Town Hall
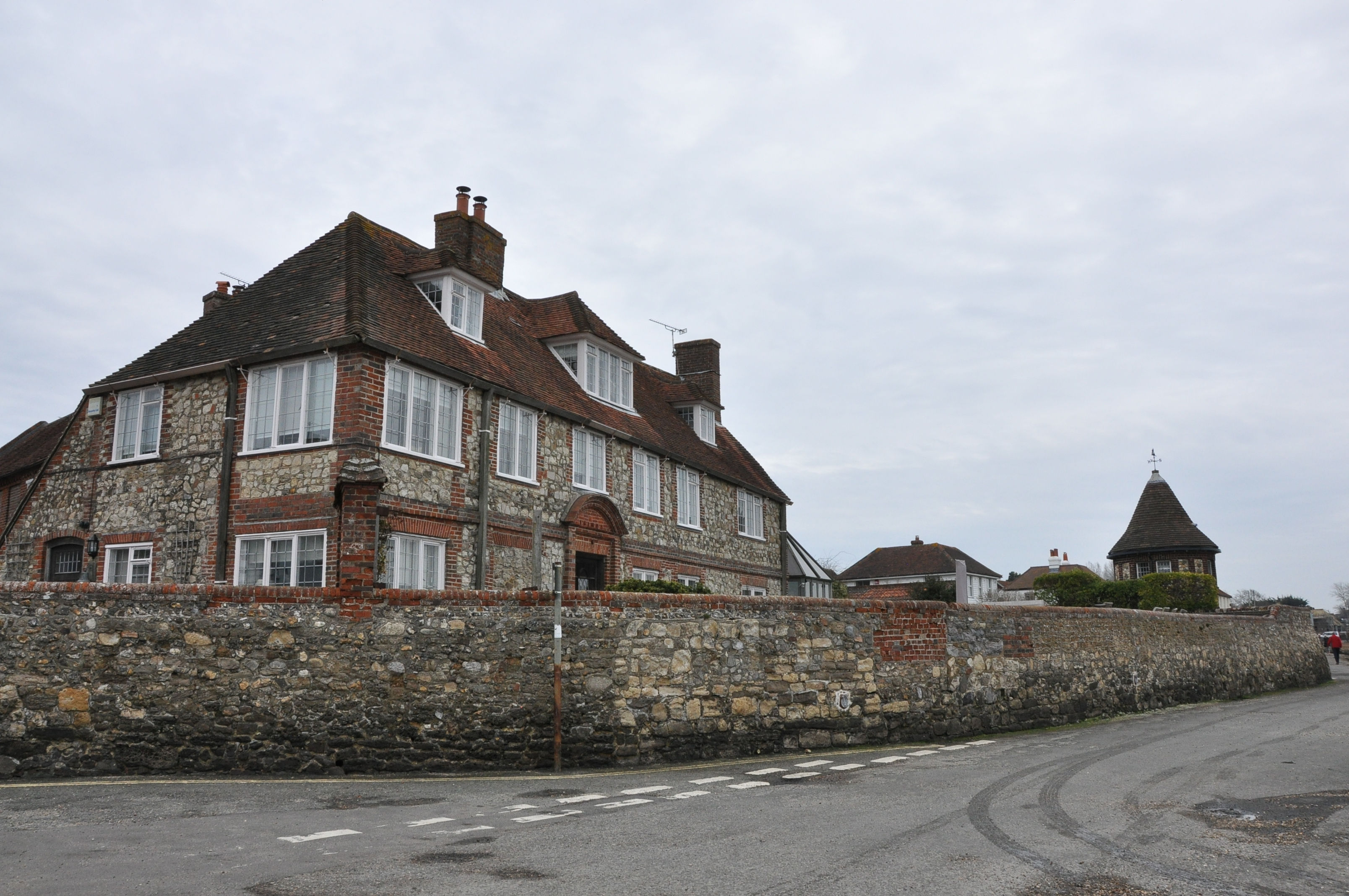
- The building in 2016

- Shown in West Sussex
- 50.8287°N 0.8570°W
- Location: Shore Road, Bosham

History
- Built: 1694

Site notes
- Architectural style: Neoclassical style

Listed Building – Grade II
- Official name: Chandler's House
- Designated: 28 January 1986
- Reference no.: 1229816

The Old Town Hall is a historic building on Shore Road in Bosham, a town in West Sussex, in England. The structure, which has been converted into a private house, is a Grade II listed building.

== History ==
The current structure consists of several properties overlooking Chichester Harbour, including a couple of workman's cottages and an early town hall, which individually date back to 1694. The properties were built in rubble masonry with red brick dressings. The old town hall was used as a local meeting place, possibly by the feudal representatives of the lords of the manor, who, in the 18th century, were the Earls of Berkeley. The properties were later amalgamated to form an integrated structure. To the left of the old town hall, there was a raised walkway, known as the "Trippit", which was built of stones from all over Europe and which had arrived in Bosham as ship's ballast.

By the early 19th century, the building was being used as a private house. A pumping station, in the form of a rotunda, designed in the William and Mary style, was erected in the garden in the early 1930s. The house then remained in the hands of the Mackenzie family, from 1934 until well into the 21st century. It was marketed for sale for £4.5 million in April 2021.

== Architecture ==
The design of the house involves an asymmetrical main frontage of six bays facing onto Shore Road. It has two storeys and an attic. It features a doorway designed in the neoclassical style and formed by a pair of brick pilasters supporting a segmental pediment. The other bays on the ground floor and all the bays on the first floor are fenestrated by casement windows. There are three dormer windows at attic level and there is a tiled roof. Internally, it contains five bedrooms, three reception rooms and five bathrooms, plus a home office with sail loft. There are exposed wooden beams throughout. The house also has boat moorings. The building, which has been heavily restored, was grade II listed in 1986, at which time it was known as Chandler's House.
