= Holy Trinity Church, Bosham =

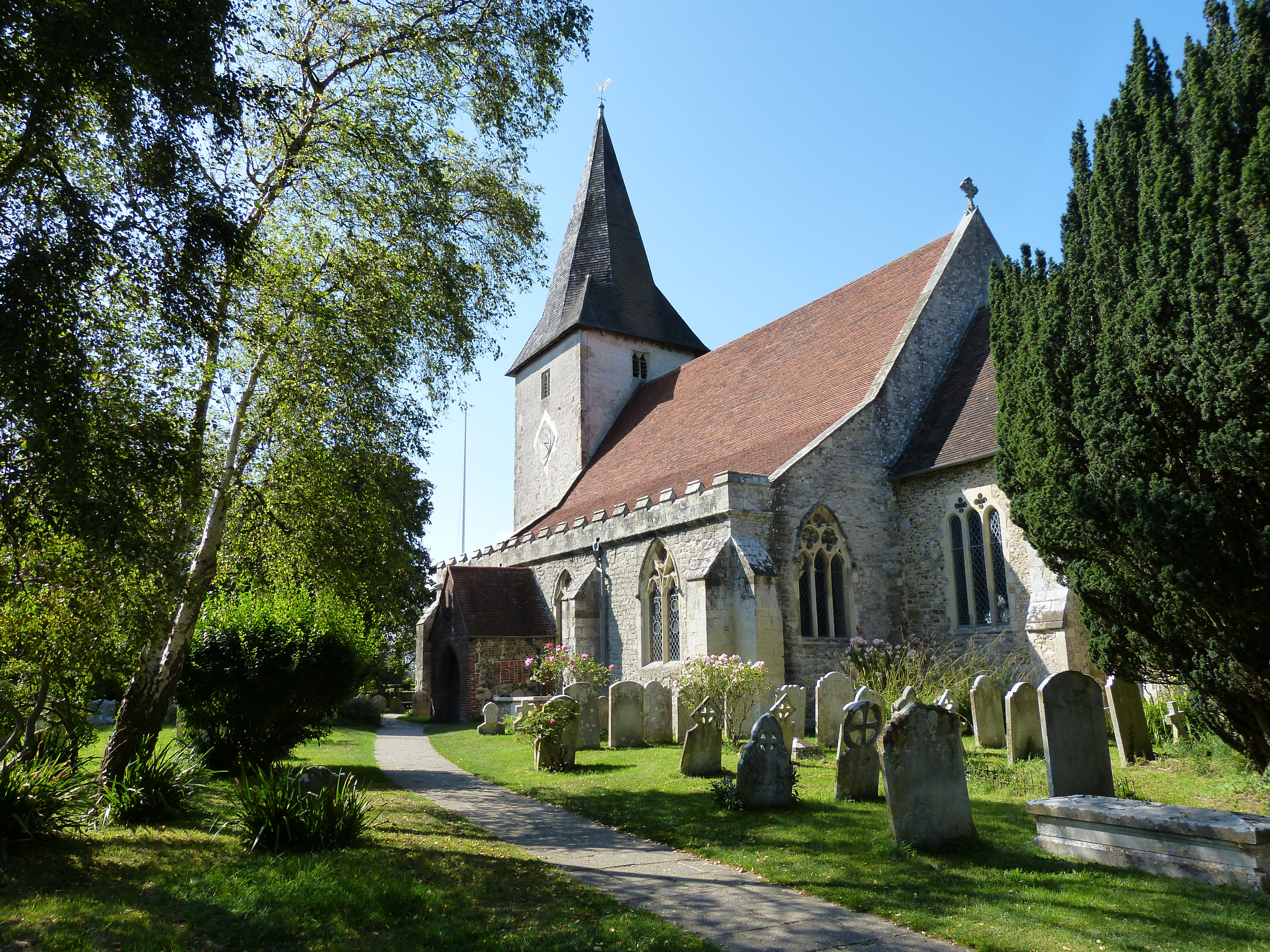
- Holy Trinity Church, Bosham
- 50°49′44″N 0°51′33″W
- OS grid reference: SU 804 039
- Location: Bosham
- Country: England
- Denomination: Church of England
- Website: http://boshamchurch.org.uk/

History
- Dedication: Holy Trinity

Architecture
- Heritage designation: Grade I
- Designated: 5 June 1958

Administration
- Diocese: Diocese of Chichester
- Deanery: Westbourne Deanery

Holy Trinity Church is a Grade I listed Anglican church, a parish church in Bosham, West Sussex. There was a church on this site in Saxon times, and the oldest parts of the building date from that period.

== History ==
=== Background ===
Bede wrote that Bishop Wilfrid, visiting Bosham in 681, found a small monastery with five or six brethren led by Dicul, an Irish monk. The building may have been on or near the site of the present church.

Before the Norman Conquest, Bosham Church and its estate were given by King Edward the Confessor to his Norman chaplain Osbern FitzOsbern. Osbern retained these after the Conquest; he became Bishop of Exeter in 1072 and attached these holdings to the bishopric. Succeeding Bishops of Exeter continued to hold the church and estate of Bosham until the Dissolution of the Monasteries.

=== The building ===
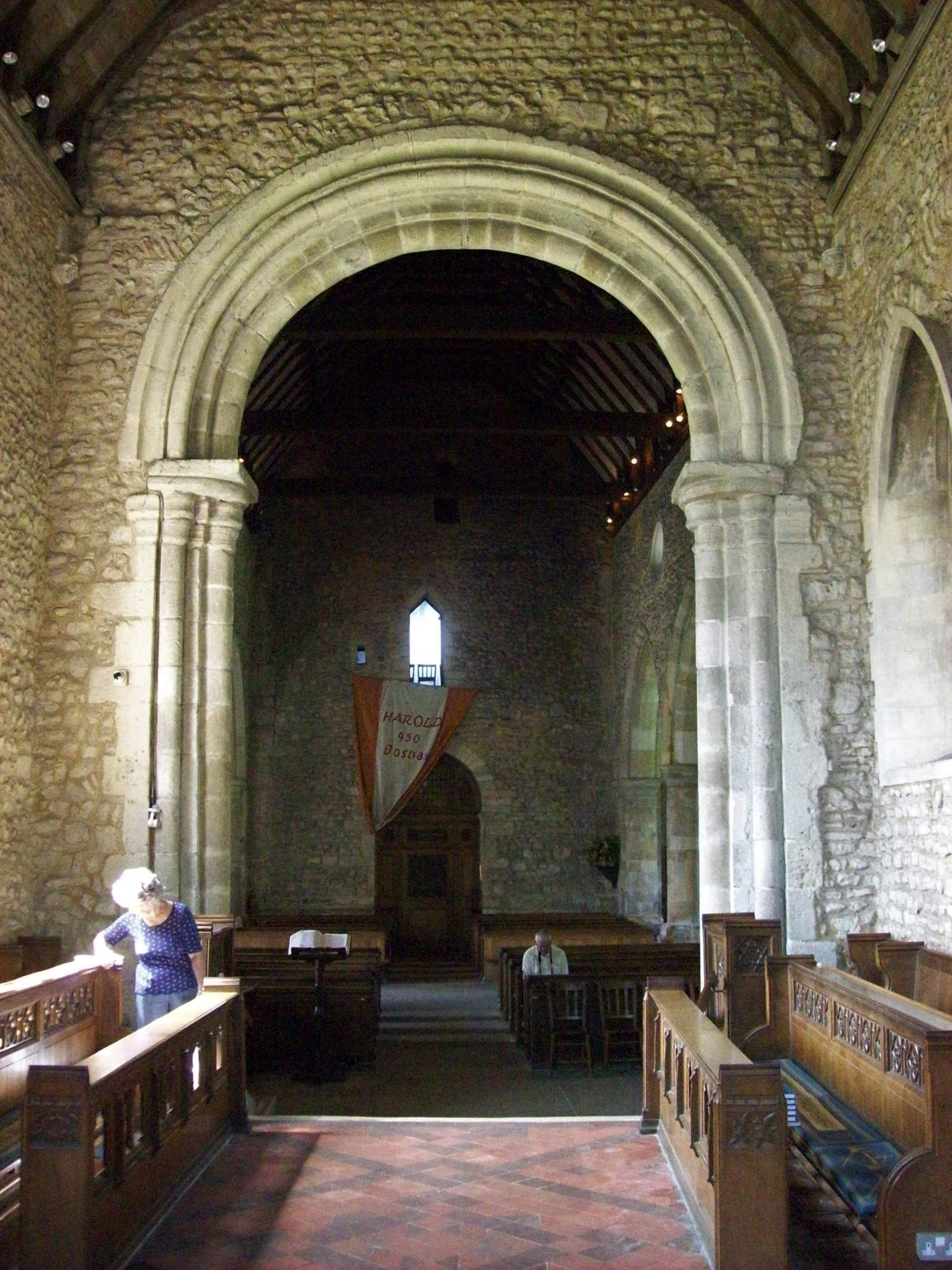
The chancel arch

Roman remains have been found in Bosham, and it is thought the church may be on the site of a Roman basilica.

The church is built of rubble with ashlar dressing; it has a tiled roof and a shingled spire. The lower part of the tower of the church, the chancel arch, and the tower arch, are Saxon. The chancel was extended to the east in the 12th century, and again in the 13th century when a sacristy was added on the north side; about this time aisles were added to the nave. The top storey of the tower is of the 15th century.

The font is of the late 12th century; it is an octagonal block with two shallow arches carved on each side, supported by a thick central shaft and four slender shafts.

The south porch is of the 16th or 17th century.

=== King Canute's daughter ===
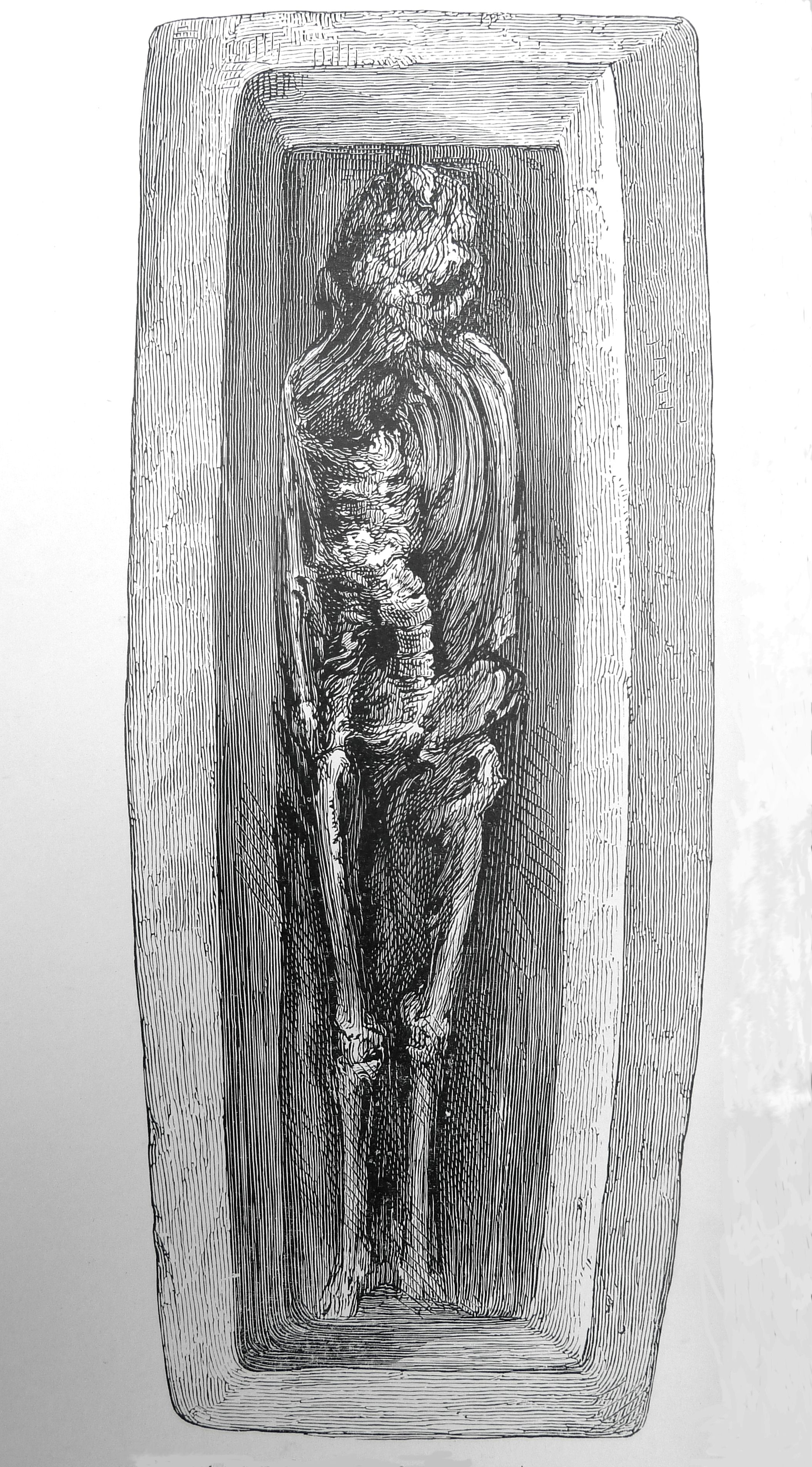
A drawing of the coffin reputedly of King Canute’s daughter

There is a tradition that a daughter of King Canute drowned in a nearby millstream and was buried in the church. A small stone coffin was found near the chancel arch in 1865, but it is not known if there is any connection.

== King Harold ==
Bosham was the principal home of Harold Godwinson, king of England in 1066; the Bayeux Tapestry shows him and his retinue riding to Bosham before sailing to Normandy to meet William, Duke of Normandy. In 1954, workmen replacing stones under the chancel arch, a burial place commonly reserved for royalty, rediscovered the coffin thought to be of King Canute's daughter, and also found a well-crafted coffin containing a skeleton; the coffin was resealed after examination of the remains by a coroner. The investigation was so unprofessional that little valid information can be drawn from it.

In 2003, amateur historians sought permission from the consistory court of the Diocese of Chichester to exhume the remains, in order to confirm if they were those of King Harold. DNA was to be compared with DNA of three people claiming to be his descendants. Permission was refused. It was stated that exhumation should only be carried out on "special and exceptional grounds" or for a "good reason"; the court heard that the three supposed descendants each had different DNA. As of October 2023, there had been no further investigation of the coffin's content.

== See also ==
- Grade I listed buildings in West Sussex
- List of current places of worship in Chichester District
