= Bosham =

Village and parish in West Sussex, England

Coordinates: 50.8289°N 0.8595°W

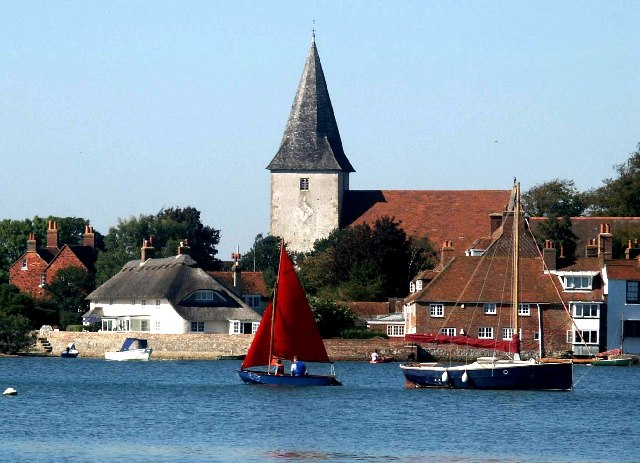
- Bosham Waterfront and Church

- Location within West Sussex
- Area: 13.75 km^{2} (5.31 sq mi)
- Population: 2,900 2011 Census including Charlton and East Lavant
  - Density: 210/km^{2} (540/sq mi)
- OS grid reference: SU8003
  - London: 57 miles (92 km) NE
- Civil parish: Bosham
- District: Chichester
- Shire county: West Sussex
- Region: South East
- Country: England
- Sovereign state: United Kingdom
- Post town: CHICHESTER
- Postcode district: PO18
- Dialling code: 01243
- Police: Sussex
- Fire: West Sussex
- Ambulance: South East Coast
- UK Parliament: Chichester
- Website: Parish Council

Bosham (/ˈbɒzəm/) is a coastal village, ecclesiastical parish and civil parish in the Chichester District of West Sussex, within the historic county of Sussex, England, centred about 2 miles (3.2 km) west of Chichester with its clustered developed part west of this.

== Geography ==
The parish has an area of 317,379 ha (784,260 acres). Its land forms a broad peninsula projecting into natural Chichester Harbour where Bosham has its own harbour and inlet on the western side.

== Demography ==
In the 2021 national census its population was 2968, a reduction from 4256 a decade earlier. 98% were ethnically white: 63.6% described themselves as Christian, while 34.7% self-identified as having "no religion".

=== Neighbourhoods ===
==== Broadbridge ====
Broadbridge, sometimes known as New Bosham more developed round the A259 road and the Coastway railway line including Bosham railway station as with most stations in the county with direct services to London as well as the cities of Brighton and Portsmouth. The locality is increasingly referred to by its earlier name, Broadbridge.

==== Bosham village and Bosham Hoe ====
Bosham is surrounded by varying width green buffer land, the vast bulk of which is the south of the peninsula. This includes the site of the original village centre on the harbour as well as the farmland and private property of Bosham Hoe. At spring tides the sea comes up high flooding the rural lower road and some car parking spaces.

== History ==
=== Roman ===
The site has been inhabited since Roman times, and is close to the famous palace at Fishbourne. Several important Roman buildings have been found in northern Bosham around Broadbridge including a possible temple, a small theatre and a mosaic. The Bosham Head, part of the largest Roman statue from Britain, was found nearby. A legionary's helmet was found in Bosham harbour and is now in Lewes museum. The helmet is of late Claudian date, the time of the invasion.

Tradition holds that Emperor Vespasian maintained a residence in Bosham, although there is no evidence of this. There are also said to be remains of a building popularly thought to be a villa belonging to Vespasian, at the Stone Wall in the parish. Pottery and tile fragments, of both Roman and early British period, have been discovered in the area, confirming pre-Anglo-Saxon activity. The possible Roman harbour there was part of the natural harbours between Portsmouth and Chichester known as Magnus Portus (Note: The name Magnus Portus was used for several Roman ports and harbours.) and its position, as latitude and longitude, was plotted as part of Ptolemy's Geography.

=== Anglo-Saxon and Norman periods ===
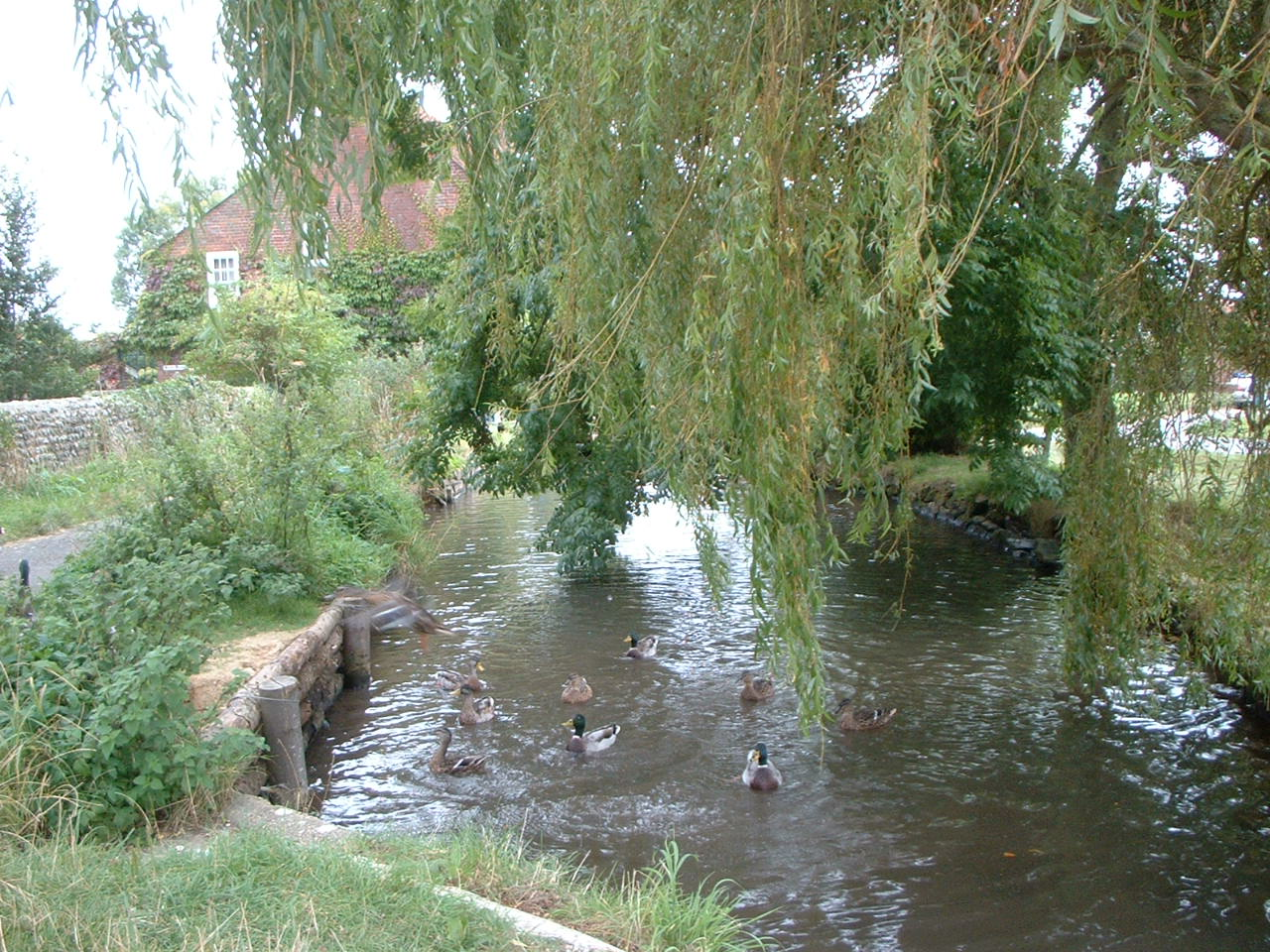
The mill-stream where King Canute's daughter is reputed to have drowned.

Much of Bosham's history during the Early Middle Ages is ecclesiastical. Bede mentions Bosham in his book The Ecclesiastical History of the English Nation, speaking of Wilfrid's visit there in 681 when he encountered a Celtic monk, Dicul, and five disciples in a small monastery. The village is one of only five places that appear on the map attached to the Anglo-Saxon Chronicle of around this time.

In 850, the original village church was built possibly on the site of a Roman building, and in the 10th century was replaced with Holy Trinity Church, situated beside Bosham Quay, that still serves as the local place of worship. There is a tradition that a daughter of Canute the Great drowned in a nearby brook and was buried there, although there seems to be little evidence for this. The tradition was originally linked to a fourteenth- or fifteenth-century effigy. In 1865 a coffin containing a child's skeleton was discovered, buried in the nave in front of what is now the chancel of Holy Trinity Church. This was thought to be Canute's daughter.

There is a legend that around this time Bosham Church was plundered by Danish pirates, who stole the tenor bell. As the pirate ship sailed away, the remaining church bells were rung. The tenor bell miraculously joined in, destroying the ship. The bell is still said to ring beneath the waters whenever the other bells are rung.

==== Harold Godwinson ====
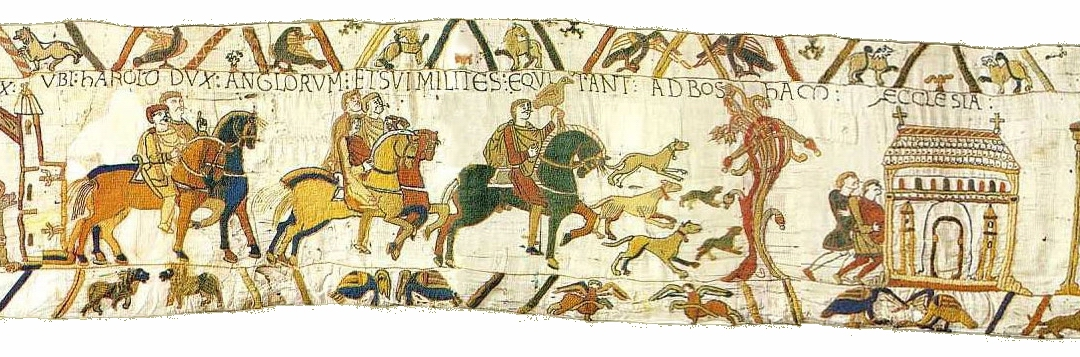
In the Bayeux Tapestry's second scene, "Where Harold, Earl of the English, and his knights ride to Bosham Church." (above, AD BOSHAM ECCLESIA)

Bosham is mentioned by name in the Bayeux Tapestry, where in 1064 Harold stops to pray in the church before sailing to meet with William of Normandy and confirm Edward the Confessor’s decision that William will succeed him as king. Later on his deathbed Edward changes his mind, naming Harold as his successor and, thereby, setting into motion the Norman conquest.

"Ubi Harold Dux Anglorum et sui milites equitant ad Bosham ecclesia[m]"
(Where Harold, Earl of the English, and his army ride to Bosham church)

Harold's strong association with Bosham and the recent discovery of an Anglo-Saxon grave in the church has led some historians to speculate that King Harold was buried there following his death at the Battle of Hastings, rather than Waltham Abbey as is often reported. The speculation began in 1954, when the nave was re-paved, and the body of King Canute's reputed daughter was re-examined. It was discovered that the body of a richly dressed man was buried beside the child's. A request to exhume the grave in Bosham church was refused by the Diocese of Chichester in December 2004, the Chancellor ruling that the chances of establishing the identity of the body as that of Harold Godwinson were too slim to justify disturbing a burial place.

==== Domesday Book ====
The Domesday Book of 1086 listed Bosham as a Hundred, and one of the wealthiest manors in England. It included the nearby village of Chidham. Bosham was confirmed to be in the possession of Osbern, Bishop of Exeter, who had been granted the land by his kinsman, Edward the Confessor. It possessed 112 hides (~13,000 acres or 5,300 ha) in different parts of the country. Unlike many places, lordship of much of Bosham remained in the same hands after the conquest as before, although the ownership of Earl Godwin's land was under the ownership of King William at the time of the survey.

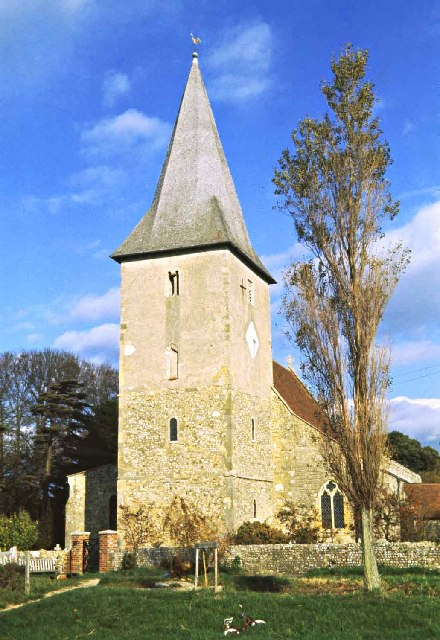
Holy Trinity Church. The lower storeys of the tower are Saxon.

=== Modern times ===
Bosham was the scene of a brutal murder in 2013 that was not solved for nearly six years. The case featured on the Sky documentary series Killer in My Village (Season 4, Episode 8).

== Landmarks ==
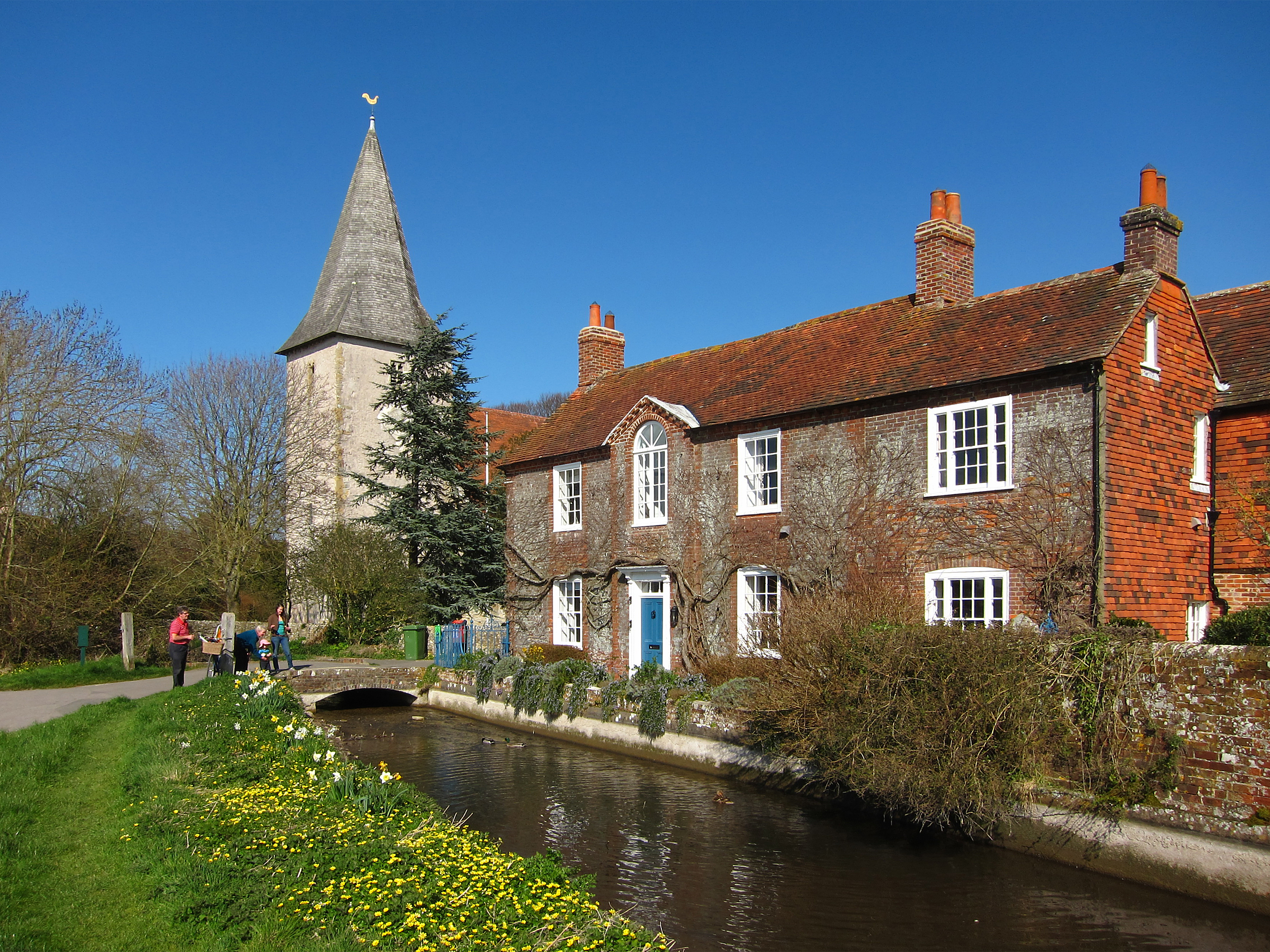
The Grade II listed 18th-century Brook House with Holy Trinity church behind

The Holy Trinity Church is a historic building of some note – it has been in existence at least since Anglo-Saxon times, and is mentioned in the Domesday Book. It has been dedicated to the Holy Trinity since the early part of the 14th century; its previous dedication is not known. Much of the building retains its original Saxon architecture, dating from about the late 800s. The tower houses an original Saxon window. There is also a 13th-century crypt, which is speculated to have been a charnel house used to harbour the bones of those from the collegiate church nearby.

Holy Trinity occasionally hosts concerts and recitals.

Chichester Harbour, a Site of Special Scientific Interest is partly within the parish. This is a wetland of international importance, a Special Protection Area for wild birds and a Special Area of Conservation. The harbour is of particular importance for wintering wildfowl and waders of which five species reach numbers which are internationally important.

Notable buildings in Bosham include the Old Town Hall, built in 1694.

== Sports and recreation ==
=== Bosham Sailing Club ===
Bosham Sailing Club (BSC) is the oldest sailing club in Chichester Harbour and was founded in 1907. Its clubhouse is the Old Mill on Bosham Quay with a terrace overlooking the picturesque harbour.

=== Bosham F.C. ===
Bosham Football Club was founded in 1901. They were one of the founding members of the Sussex County League Division Three in 1983. Bosham have won the Division Three title on three occasions – and finished runner-up once – earning promotion to Division Two, with their highest finishes being 7th place in 1985–86 and 1994–95 seasons. This period also saw the club take part in the FA Vase. In 2012, the club were demoted into the West Sussex League on ground grading issues, and now play in the League's Premier Division. Also known as 'The Robins', the team play their home fixtures at Bosham's local recreation ground on Walton Lane. The club also operates a reserve side, and youth team – known as the 'Bosham Cygnets', composed of local youngsters.

=== Bosham Cygnets ===
Bosham Cygnets is a youth football team who currently compete at both Under 15 and Under 18 level – where the club has two sides – in the Arun & Chichester Youth League. The club play their fixtures on a Sunday. Over the years, the Cygnets have been renowned for encouraging young footballing talent and acted as a feeder for regional Centre of Excellences at local professional Football League clubs, including Portsmouth, Southampton and Brighton & Hove Albion.

== In popular culture ==
- The X-Files episode Fire has its cold open set in the village.

== See also ==
- Boscombe
- Herbert of Bosham
