= Milland =

Village and parish in West Sussex, England

Coordinates: 51.03601°N 0.80607°W

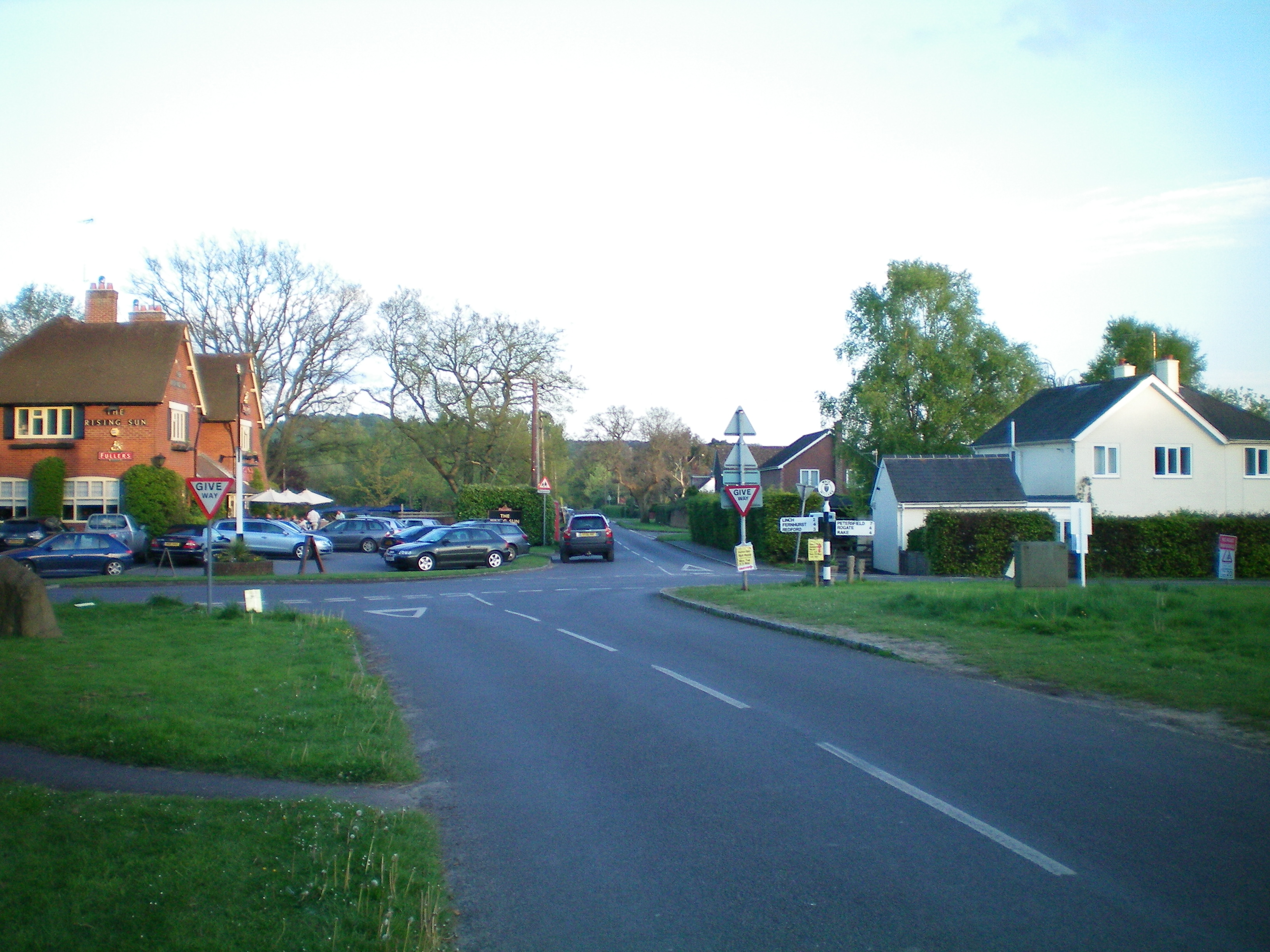
- Milland Crossroads

- Location within West Sussex
- Area: 20.34 km^{2} (7.85 sq mi)
- Population: 891 2011 Census
  - Density: 41/km^{2} (110/sq mi)
- OS grid reference: SU838269
  - London: 44 miles (71 km) NE
- Civil parish: Milland
- District: Chichester
- Shire county: West Sussex
- Region: South East
- Country: England
- Sovereign state: United Kingdom
- Post town: LIPHOOK
- Postcode district: GU30
- Dialling code: 01428
- Police: Sussex
- Fire: West Sussex
- Ambulance: South East Coast
- UK Parliament: Chichester
- Website: https://www.milland-wsx-pc.gov.uk/

Milland is a village and civil parish in the Chichester district of West Sussex, England. It is situated north of the A272 road on the border with Hampshire.

In the 2001 census the parish covered 5,023 acres (20.33 km^{2}) and had 332 households with a total population of 829 of whom 394 residents were economically active. At the 2011 Census the population was 891.

The village lies along a section of the Chichester to Silchester Way Roman road, almost the only part to have survived in modern use. At the southern end of the village the boundary banks of a mansio, a Roman posting station on the road, are visible.

The parish has an Anglican church, St. Luke's, the independent Milland Evangelical Church (MEC) and the disused Tuxlith Chapel which is in the care of a national charity the Friends of Friendless Churches.

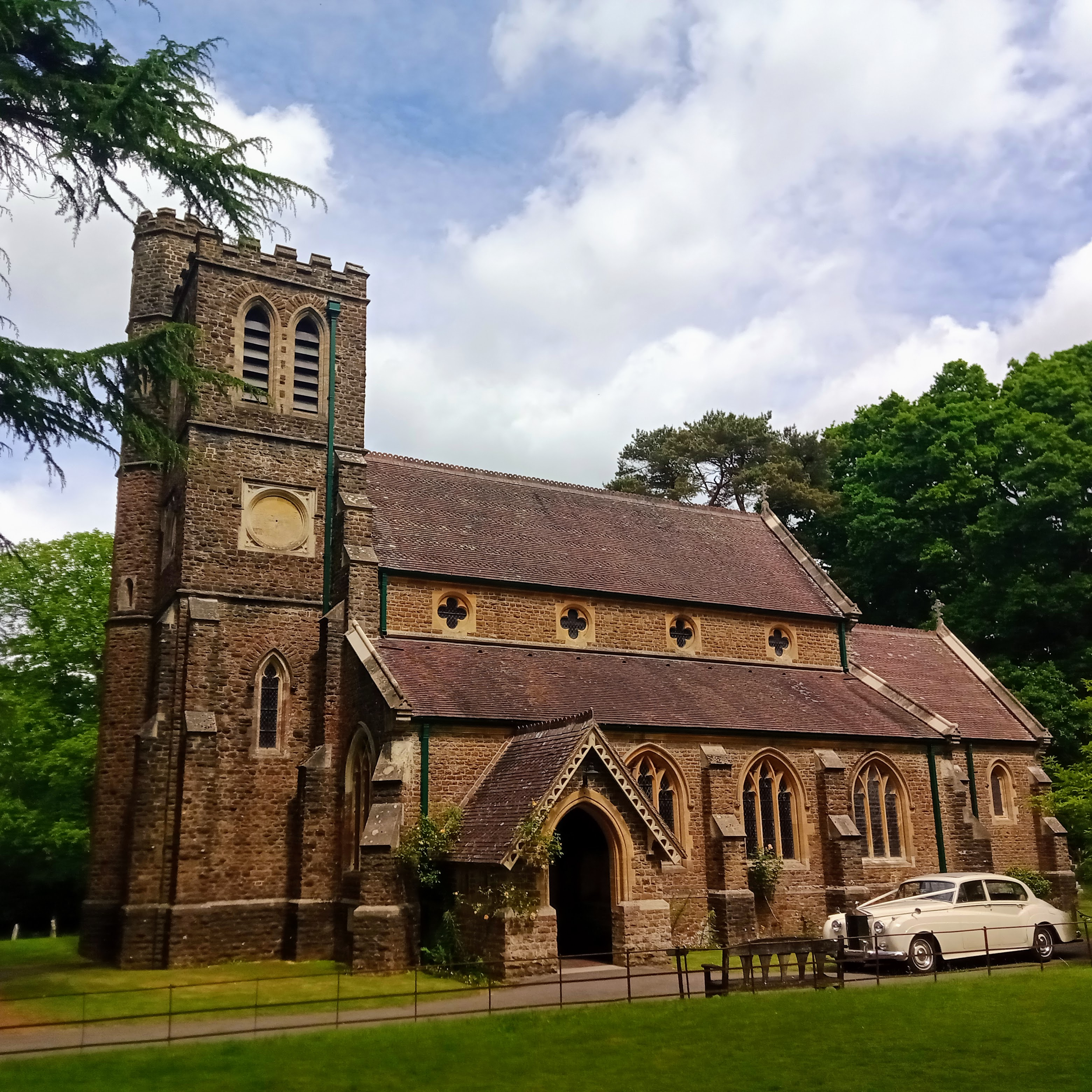
The Parish Church of St Luke, Milland.

The Parish Church of St Luke was built close to the site of the disused Tuxlith Chapel, in order to serve the communities of both Milland and Rake. It was built between 1878 and 1880, to replace the smaller chapel as the Parish Church.

== Hamlets ==
Hamlets within the civil parish include: Borden to the south, Queens Corner and Titty Hill to the southeast, Wardley and Shufflesheeps to the northeast, Ripsley to the northeast and Great Trippetts to the west.

== Employment ==
Whilst farming and working the land were most important for most people in the past, the Iron and other industries were significant from the Middle Ages.

== Estates ==
There have been several large estates in the village but none dominant.

Dangstein House was the home of Captain James Lyon of the East India Company. In 1851, Reginald Nevill and Lady Dorothy Nevill bought the estate. Lady Dorothy laid out ornamental gardens, a fernery and hothouses.

== Famous visitors ==
Both the Kaiser and Winston Churchill were guests of the Dowager Lady Massereene and Ferrard at Milland Place before the First World War. The Kaiser played racquets despite his withered arm.
