= Listed buildings in Arun District =

There are around 1,000 Listed buildings in Arun District, East Sussex, which are buildings of architectural or historic interest.

- Grade I buildings are of exceptional interest.
- Grade II* buildings are particularly important buildings of more than special interest.
- Grade II buildings are of special interest.

The lists follow Historic England’s geographical organisation, with entries grouped by county, local authority, and parish (civil and non-civil). The following lists are arranged by parish.

Parish	Listed buildings list	Grade I	Grade II*	Grade II	Total
Aldingbourne	Listed buildings in Aldingbourne				33
Aldwick	Listed buildings in Aldwick				20
Angmering	Listed buildings in Angmering				63
Arundel	Listed buildings in Arundel	4	7	196	207
Barnham	Listed buildings in Barnham, West Sussex				24
Bersted	Listed buildings in Bersted				19
Bognor Regis	Listed buildings in Bognor Regis				80
Burpham	Listed buildings in Burpham				22
Clapham	Listed buildings in Clapham, West Sussex				14
Climping	Listed buildings in Climping				23
East Preston	Listed buildings in East Preston, West Sussex				12
Eastergate	no listed buildings				
Felpham	Listed buildings in Felpham				20
Ferring	Listed buildings in Ferring				20
Findon	Listed buildings in Findon, West Sussex				26
Ford	Listed buildings in Ford, West Sussex				4
Houghton	Listed buildings in Houghton, West Sussex				19
Kingston	Listed buildings in Kingston by Ferring				6
Littlehampton	Listed buildings in Littlehampton				83
Lyminster	Listed buildings in Lyminster				18
Madehurst	Listed buildings in Madehurst				10
Middleton-on-Sea	Listed buildings in Middleton-on-Sea				6
Pagham	Listed buildings in Pagham				31
Patching	Listed buildings in Patching				15
Poling	Listed buildings in Poling, West Sussex				11
Rustington	Listed buildings in Rustington				36
Slindon	Listed buildings in Slindon				62
South Stoke	Listed buildings in South Stoke, West Sussex				13
Walberton	Listed buildings in Walberton				40
Warningcamp	Listed buildings in Warningcamp				11
Yapton	Listed buildings in Yapton				32
Total (Arun district)	—	24	29	926	979

== See also ==
- Grade I listed buildings in West Sussex
- Grade II* listed buildings in West Sussex
