= List of places of worship in Arun =

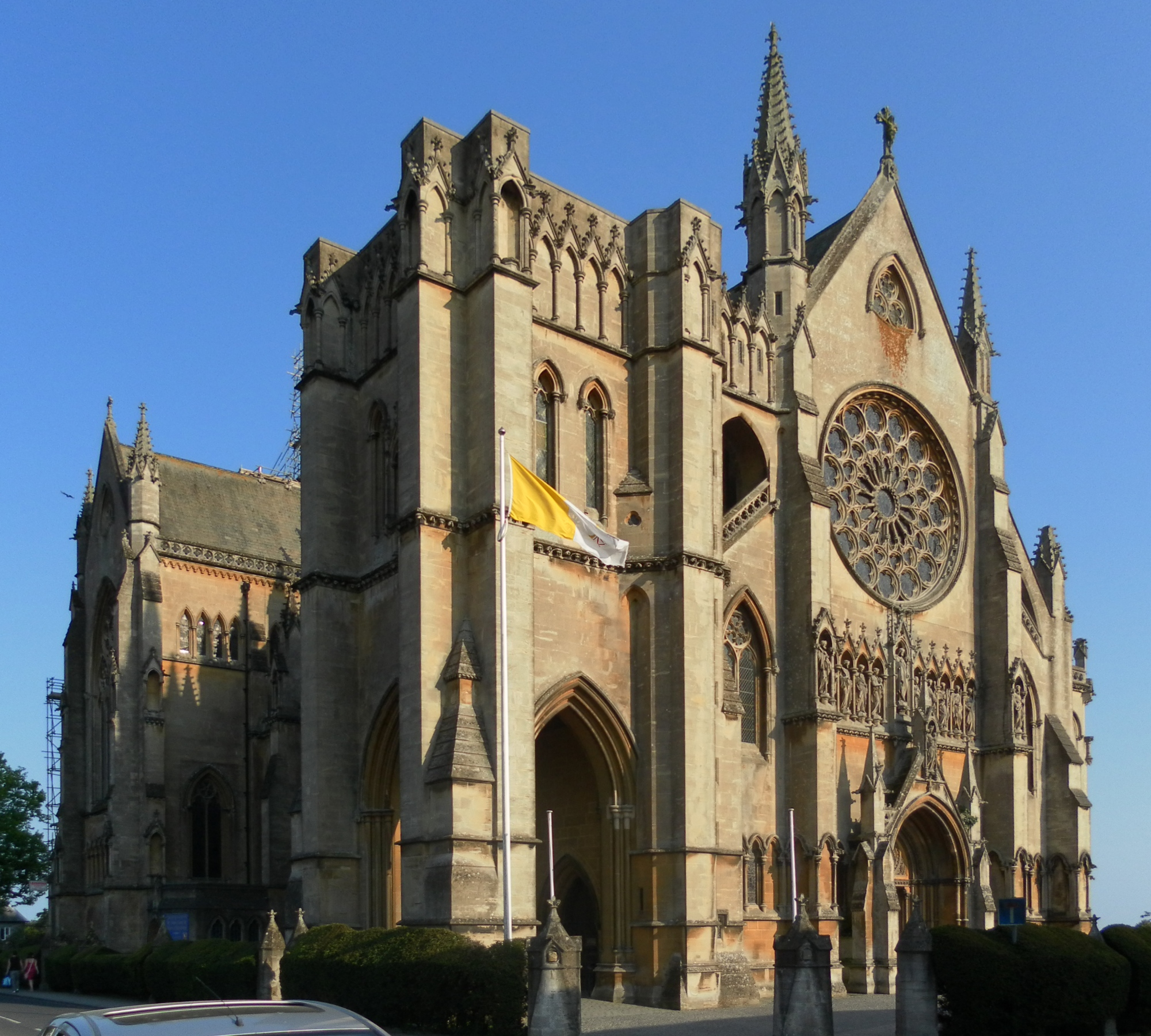
The French Gothic Revival Roman Catholic cathedral at Arundel, built in 1870–73, dominates the town's skyline.

The district of Arun, one of seven local government districts in the English county of West Sussex, has 91 current and former places of worship. There are 71 active churches, chapels and meeting rooms and one mosque serving the dense urban development on the English Channel coast and the mostly rural hinterland of ancient towns and villages; a further 21 former places of worship still stand but are no longer in religious use.

The 2021 United Kingdom census found that the majority of the district's population was Christian. Many churches, serving both the Church of England—the country's Established Church—and a wide variety of other Christian denominations, are located in the main towns of Littlehampton and Bognor Regis—Victorian seaside resorts which form the focal points of the nearly continuous urban area around the River Arun estuary. Surrounding villages, and their ancient and modern churches, have been absorbed by the 20th-century growth of these towns. Further north, the important hilltop town of Arundel has a Roman Catholic cathedral and a long established Church of England parish church, and was a centre of Nonconformist worship. Muslims in the area are served by a mosque and Islamic community centre in Bognor Regis.

English Heritage has awarded listed status to nearly 40 current and former church buildings in Arun. A building is defined as "listed" when it is placed on a statutory register of buildings of "special architectural or historic interest" in accordance with the Planning (Listed Buildings and Conservation Areas) Act 1990. The Department for Culture, Media and Sport, a Government department, is responsible for this; English Heritage, a non-departmental public body, acts as an agency of the department to administer the process and advise the department on relevant issues. There are three grades of listing status. Grade I, the highest, is defined as being of "exceptional interest"; Grade II* is used for "particularly important buildings of more than special interest"; and Grade II, the lowest, is used for buildings of "special interest". As of February 2001, there were 23 Grade I-listed buildings, 24 with Grade II* status and 913 Grade II-listed buildings in Arun.

== Overview of the district and its places of worship ==
The district of Arun is on the West Sussex coast.

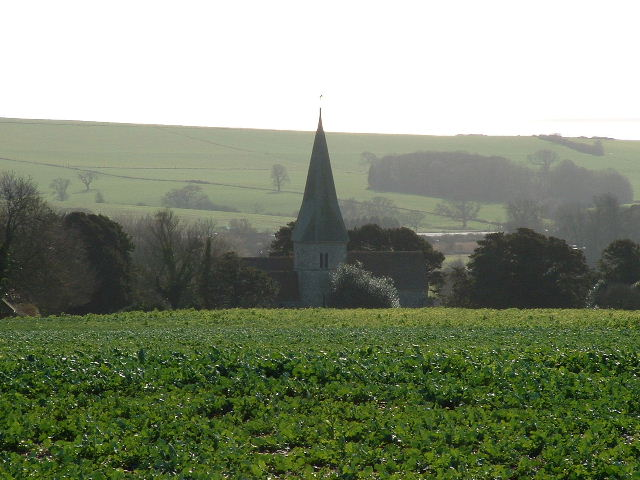
In the rural north of the district, churches such as this one at Patching nestle on the slopes of the South Downs.

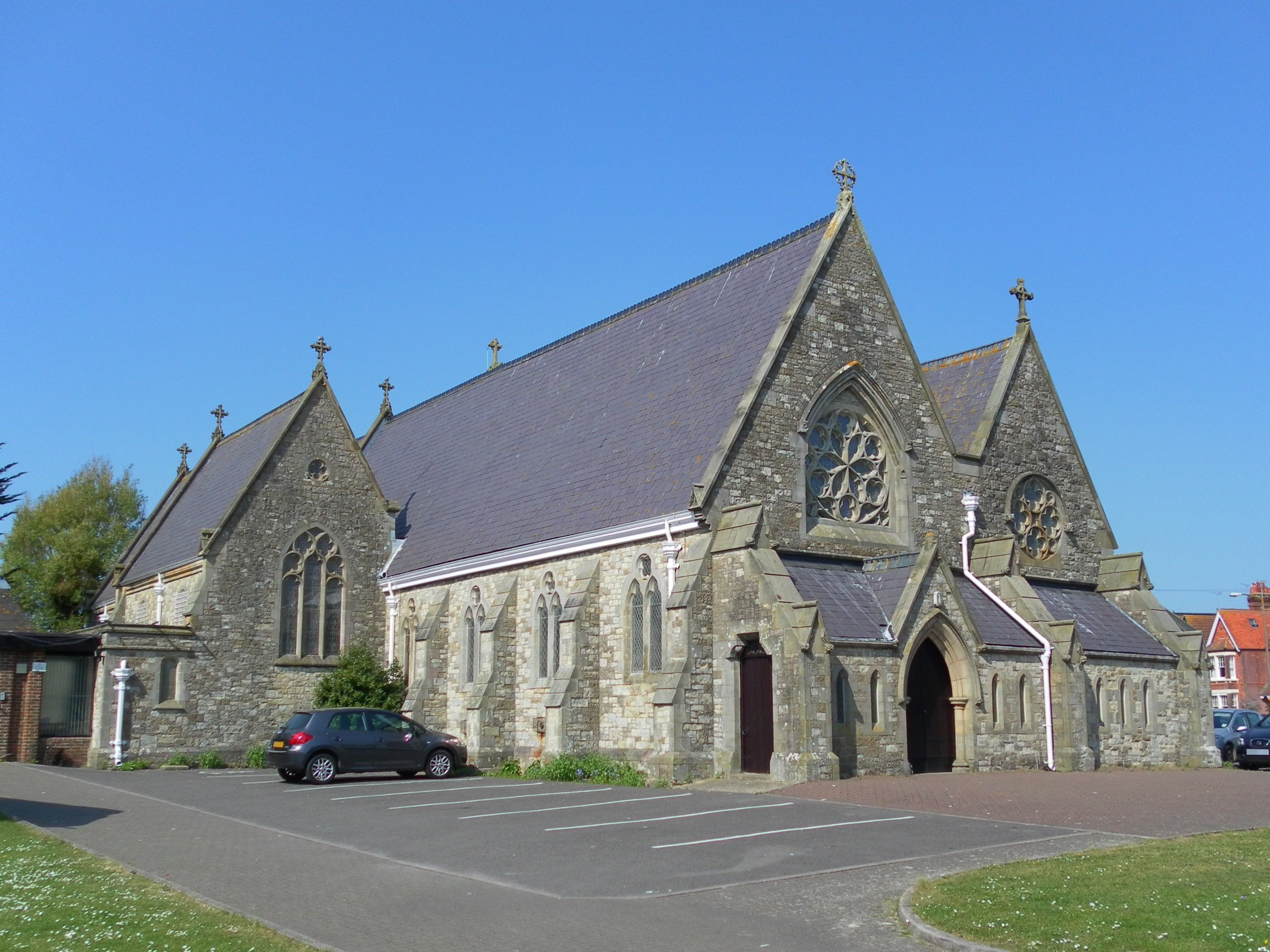
St Catherine's Roman Catholic church was founded in Littlehampton in the 1860s.

The district of Arun, created in 1974, covers a 22,811-hectare (56,370-acre) area of the English Channel coast and its hinterland in the county of West Sussex. Clockwise from the coast, it is bordered by the districts of Chichester, Horsham and Adur and the borough of Worthing. Its name comes from the River Arun, which flows north–south through the middle of the district and reaches the sea at Littlehampton, one of the main towns and the district's administrative headquarters. Littlehampton developed as a seaside resort in the 19th century; now, together with its eastern suburbs of Rustington, East Preston and Angmering (originally separate villages), it forms part of the Brighton/Worthing/Littlehampton conurbation. Each urban centre has several churches including an old Anglican parish church. West of the Arun estuary, the Bognor Regis conurbation includes the suburbs of Elmer, Middleton-on-Sea, Felpham, Aldwick and Pagham, and the 19th-century seaside resort of Bognor (suffixed Regis from 1929) itself. Many churches exist within this urban area as well. The mostly flat hinterland supports a market gardening industry and several villages and suburbs whose development was stimulated by 19th-century rail links. Further north, on the southern slopes of the South Downs, hamlets such as Madehurst, Houghton, Burpham and Poling have existed for hundreds of years, clustered around their churches. Also in the north of the district is Arundel, an ancient hilltop town with a landmark castle and Roman Catholic cathedral which together make it "from a distance ... one of the great town views in England". Until the coastal strip became heavily urbanised from the late 19th century, Arundel was the "main urban focus" of the area, and it supported places of worship for several Christian denominations. Protestant Nonconformism was particularly strong in the town.

Anglicanism, England's state religion, is represented by ancient and modern churches throughout the district. Simple Norman-era and early medieval buildings include those at Ford, Burpham (whose cruciform design is uncommon in the area), Tortington and Pagham. Another period of churchbuilding started in the 19th century in response to increasing urbanisation. In Bognor Regis, a church dedicated to St John the Baptist was built speculatively in 1821; it was pulled down in favour of Arthur Blomfield's large, "uninspired" replacement of 1886. This was in turn demolished in 1972, and the town's main Anglican church is now St Wilfrid's, a stone Gothic Revival building of 1910 by George Fellowes Prynne. Littlehampton's parish church, dedicated to St Mary, has medieval origins but was completely rebuilt in 1826 and again in 1935 (in an "eerie, disembodied Gothic Revival" style according to Ian Nairn and Nikolaus Pevsner). In the late 19th and 20th centuries, suburbs such as North Bersted, Aldwick and Wick were allocated parishes and given their own churches. Mission rooms—small, cheap chapels of ease in outlying settlements distant from their parish church—were opened in places such as Lidsey, Westergate and Warningcamp.

Roman Catholic worship was outlawed for centuries after the English Reformation, but from the mid-19th century it experienced "a striking growth ... in and around Arundel", helped by the construction of the lavish Church of Our Lady and St Philip Howard in 1869–73. This became Arundel Cathedral in 1965 when the Roman Catholic Diocese of Arundel and Brighton was created, and is the administrative centre of that region. The staunchly Catholic Dukes of Norfolk, whose seat is at Arundel Castle, were influential in Catholicism's development in Arundel and the rest of England for many years. An Anglican vicar of the 1860s said there were more Roman Catholics than Anglicans in the parish of Arundel, and about 750 lived in the area in 1973. Elsewhere in the district, Roman Catholic worship has taken place at Slindon since the late 18th century, and the present church dates from 1865; a late-19th-century priest at Arundel founded churches at Angmering, Houghton (both now closed) and Littlehampton; and Rustington and East Preston gained churches in the 20th century. Monks of the Servite Order founded Bognor Regis's Church of Our Lady of Sorrows in 1881.

Protestant Nonconformism—a strong force in Sussex since the 17th century—continues to thrive. Baptists, Methodists, the United Reformed Church, Plymouth Brethren, Quakers and other denominations are represented in the main towns and in some cases the smaller villages: for example, Baptists have met at Walberton since the 1840s and Methodists at Westergate since 1851. Congregationalists—predecessors of the current United Reformed denomination—found success in Arundel, where their chapel of 1838 (now a market) thrived until the late 20th century and established daughter churches in nearby villages such as Yapton. Quakers in Littlehampton took over a former Penny School building as their place of worship, and converted barns house Brethren in Felpham, Evangelicals in Aldwick and Baptists in Angmering (whose "strangely towered" former chapel is now in residential use). Baptists in Arundel and Walberton also sold their original chapels and built new ones.

For centuries, coastal erosion has affected the area covered by the modern district. Several churches and whole settlements have been lost to the sea or to depopulation brought about by erosion. Cudlow and Ilsham, both in Climping parish, lost their churches by the 17th century, as did nearby Atherington. The church at Middleton-on-Sea fell into disrepair by the late 18th century, and the sea was eroding the graveyard, revealing dead bodies. Destruction came in 1838, when a high tide engulfed the ruins. A new church was built soon afterwards. The ancient chapel of St Bartholomew at Bognor was washed away in the early 16th century. In the parish of Angmering, only St Margaret's Church survives: it was described as the church of West Angmering during the medieval era, when East Angmering and Barpham each had their own building. Barpham's fell down and went out of use in the 16th century, and East Angmering's was derelict by the same time and no longer survives. Excavations in the 20th century revealed fragmentary remains of each. Some other churches and chapels fell out of use before the English Reformation but survive in other uses—for example at Bilsham (now a house), Nyetimber (part of a retirement home complex) and Bailiffscourt (in the grounds of a luxury hotel).

== Religious affiliation ==
According to the 2021 United Kingdom census, 164,889 lived in Arun district. Of these, 52.11% identified themselves as Christian, 0.7% were Muslim, 0.3% were Buddhist, 0.24% were Hindu, 0.16% were Jewish, 0.05% were Sikh, 0.52% followed another religion, 39.88% claimed no religious affiliation and 6.04% did not state their religion. The proportions of Christians and people who followed no religion were higher than the figures in England as a whole (46.32% and 36.67% respectively). Islam, Judaism, Hinduism, Buddhism and Sikhism had a lower following in the district than in the country overall: in 2021, 6.73% of people in England were Muslim, 1.81% were Hindu, 0.92% were Sikh, 0.48% were Jewish and 0.46% were Buddhist.

== Administration ==
All Anglican churches in Arun district are part of the Diocese of Chichester, whose cathedral is at Chichester, and (with one exception) the Archdeaconry of Chichester—one of three subdivisions which make up the next highest level of administration. In turn, this archdeaconry is divided into five deaneries. The churches at Clapham, Ferring, Findon and Patching are in the Rural Deanery of Worthing. Those at Aldingbourne, Aldwick, Angmering, Arundel, Barnham, Binsted, Bognor Regis, Burpham, Climping, East Preston, Eastergate, Felpham, Ford, Lyminster, Madehurst, Middleton-on-Sea, North Bersted, Pagham, Poling, Rustington, Slindon, South Bersted, South Stoke, Walberton, Wick and Yapton, and the two in Littlehampton, are part of the Rural Deanery of Arundel and Bognor. Houghton's church is within the Rural Deanery of Petworth in the Archdeaconry of Horsham.

The Roman Catholic Diocese of Arundel and Brighton, whose cathedral is at Arundel, administers the district's seven Roman Catholic churches. Arundel Cathedral itself, and the three churches (Bognor Regis, Rose Green and Slindon) which make up Bognor Regis and Slindon parish, are in Cathedral Deanery. East Preston, Littlehampton and Rustington's churches are part of Worthing Deanery. Littlehampton is part of a joint parish with Rustington. A Vigil Mass (First Mass of Sunday) is also offered at the chapel of the Convent of the Poor Clares at Crossbush and is open to the public; this location is part of Cathedral Deanery.

Some Methodist and United Reformed churches in the district are part of the South West Sussex United Area, founded in January 2010 as an ecumenical arrangement between the local Methodist Circuit and the Southern Synod of the United Reformed Church. Bognor Regis, Felpham, Rustington and Westergate Methodist Churches, Pagham and Rustington United Reformed Churches and the Littlehampton United Church (a joint congregation of both denominations) are part of the United Area.

Baptist churches at Angmering, Aldwick, Arundel, Bognor Regis, Ferring, and Littlehampton are administratively part of the West Sussex Network of the South Eastern Baptist Association.

== Current places of worship ==
Current places of worship
Name	Image	Location	Denomination/ Affiliation	Grade	Notes	Refs
St Mary the Virgin Church (More images)		Aldingbourne; 50.8415°N 0.6899°W	Anglican	I	Some early-12th-century work remains in the form of a window and a blank arcade—a reminder of a now vanished aisle. The ashlar and rubble exterior mostly dates from an 1867 restoration by Ewan Christian, although the unusual turreted wall of the south aisle remains. The tower is Early English in style.	
St Richard's Church (More images)		Aldwick; 50.7838°N 0.7110°W	Anglican	–	Francis Troup's church of 1933–34, serving this high-class interwar suburb of Bognor Regis, was condemned as "horrible" by Ian Nairn for its "debilitated Gothic Revival" design. It was founded on 3 April 1933 and is built of brown brick with stone dressings.	
St Margaret's Church (More images)		Angmering; 50.8289°N 0.4862°W	Anglican	II*	S.S. Teulon's wholesale rebuilding of 1852–53 retained some medieval fabric, including an Early English-style door (although this was resited). The substantial, buttressed tower dates from 1507, and a side chapel is dedicated to the Gratwick family. The church stands on raised ground in a large churchyard.	
Angmering Baptist Church (More images)		Angmering; 50.8248°N 0.4865°W	Baptist	–	The former Baptist chapel nearby was unsuitable by the 1960s, so this former barn was converted into a new church in 1970 and extended to give a capacity of 150 worshippers. Membership in 1985 was recorded as 87. The church was registered for worship and for marriages in July 1970.	
St Nicholas' Church (More images)		Arundel; 50.8559°N 0.5570°W	Anglican	I	In the 12th century, the pre-Norman Conquest church was linked to the abbey at Séez as a priory, and it thrived throughout the Middle Ages. The present flint, Caen stone and sandstone church dates from the 14th and 15th centuries: it was rebuilt from 1380 in the Perpendicular Gothic style. The Fitzalan Chapel forms the eastern section.	
Arundel Baptist Church (More images)		Arundel; 50.8524°N 0.5627°W	Baptist	–	The former Baptist chapel in Arun Street closed in 1967, but the cause was restarted six years later with the help of Angmering's church. Lancing's minister later took over responsibility. The 80-capacity building dates from 1980 and was registered for worship that August; a licence for marriages followed in April 1983.	
Cathedral of Our Lady and St Philip Howard (More images)		Arundel; 50.8552°N 0.5588°W	Roman Catholic	I	Joseph Hansom's design of 1868–69 was completed four years later. The Bath Stone French Gothic Revival building dominates the town's skyline despite the absence of a planned tower; the roof has a flèche, though. The tall, soaring interior has high-quality stained glass by Hardman & Co. It became a cathedral in 1965.	
St Mary the Virgin Church (More images)		Barnham; 50.8237°N 0.6435°W	Anglican	I	This simple church has Norman and 13th-century fabric. "One of Sussex's nicest exteriors" (according to Ian Nairn) has a white weatherboarded belfry. The plain nave and chancel have no division.	
Brethren Meeting Room (More images)		Barnham; 50.8341°N 0.6452°W	Plymouth Brethren Christian Church	–	This former caretakers' house associated with the adjacent school has been converted into a local meeting room serving members of the Plymouth Brethren Christian Church associated with the main Gospel hall at Aldingbourne. It was in use by 2014.	
St Mary's Church (More images)		Binsted; 50.8454°N 0.6061°W	Anglican	II*	Sir Thomas Jackson restored this small, remote Norman church in 1867. Some 12th-century work remains, though, including a mural featuring a Tree of Life. The building has a nave and chancel with no chancel arch, a small belfry and a timber-framed roof. It was upgraded from Grade II- to Grade II*-listed status in June 2021.	
St Wilfrid's Church (More images)		Bognor Regis; 50.7826°N 0.6845°W	Anglican	–	George Fellowes Prynne's Perpendicular Gothic Revival design has been criticised as "hard and heartless". The tall, wide church, built of stone with a multicoloured brick interior, appears unfinished: the two-bay nave is shorter than intended. An apse beyond it contains a Lady chapel. Now a parish church, it used to be a chapel of ease to the now demolished St John the Baptist's Church.	
The Shore Community Church (More images)		Bognor Regis; 50.7873°N 0.6828°W	Baptist	–	Baptists worshipped in Bognor Regis from 1903, but their original chapel passed to the Salvation Army and a new brick building was erected on Victoria Drive in 1964. It was registered for worship and for marriages in August 1965. Originally known as Bognor Regis Baptist Church and later as Open Gate Church, it adopted its present name in 2019.	
London Road Gospel Hall (More images)		Bognor Regis; 50.7870°N 0.6741°W	Exclusive Brethren	–	In the mid-20th century, Brethren worshipped in the former Primitive Methodist chapel of 1876 (demolished in 1970). They now occupy a meeting hall on the London Road. Under the name Burnett Hall, it was registered for worship in February 1958 and for marriages in September 1961.	
Bognor Regis Methodist Church (More images)		Bognor Regis; 50.7829°N 0.6759°W	Methodist	–	This centrally located church dates from 1925 and replaced the original 1840 chapel—demolished in 1980 after a period of commercial use. Another Methodist chapel existed between 1876 and 1932 nearby. James Withers adopted the Arts and Crafts style and provided a galleried and arcaded interior. The brown-brick exterior has a tower. The building was registered for worship in February 1925 and for marriages three months later. In November 2025 it was closed	
Shahjalal Muslim Society and Islamic Centre		Bognor Regis; 50.7886°N 0.6730°W	Muslim	–	This building on Spencer Street is a former vehicle workshop. Permission to convert it into a mosque and Islamic community centre was granted in 1999.	
RCCG True Vine Church (More images)		Bognor Regis; 50.7876°N 0.6798°W	Redeemed Christian Church of God	–	The Redeemed Christian Church of God denomination have registered part of the former Bognor Regis United Reformed Church for worship and for the celebration of marriages—the latter in February 2015. The building is now known as the Jeneses Community Arts Centre: it opened under that guise in July 2012.	
Friends Meeting House (More images)		Bognor Regis; 50.7817°N 0.6842°W	Quaker	–	Quakers in Bognor Regis worship at this meeting house on Victoria Drive. The residential building was purchased by the community for £105,000 in 1993. After minor alterations to the ground floor, which was converted into a "substantial open plan meeting room", it opened later that year and was registered for worship in January 1996.	
Church of Our Lady of Sorrows (More images)		Bognor Regis; 50.7842°N 0.6702°W	Roman Catholic	II	The town had a Servite priory and convent until the 1990s, and priests from the priory founded and served this church at first. Designed by Joseph Stanislaus Hansom, it was founded on 26 October 1881 and opened on 16 August 1882. Its tall west façade faces a narrow road, and the building goes back a long way: the interior feels open and spacious, although there are side chapels. The five-bay nave was extended by W.C. Mangan in 1955–57; he also added transepts, a Lady chapel and other rooms. The Early English Gothic Revival church is mostly of yellow brick and stone. Some windows are in the more intricate Perpendicular style. It was listed in June 2015.	
The Salvation Army: Bognor Regis (More images)		Bognor Regis; 50.7848°N 0.6776°W	Salvation Army	–	F.J. Rayner designed this pedimented red-brick chapel in 1903 for the town's Baptists. After their new church was built on Victoria Drive in the 1960s, the Salvation Army acquired and renamed it. It was registered for worship in April 1966 and for marriages in January 1971.	
Bognor Regis Spiritualist Centre (More images)		Bognor Regis; 50.7845°N 0.6724°W	Spiritualist	–	The congregation developed in 1940 and worshipped in a building in Argyle Circus until they raised enough money to purchase a site on nearby Sudley Road. They have occupied the present building there since 1961, and it was registered for worship in February of that year and for marriages in 1971. It has also been known as the United National Spiritualist Church and Bognor Regis National Spiritualist Church.	
St Mary's Church (More images)		Burpham; 50.8710°N 0.5244°W	Anglican	I	Unusual locally for its cruciform shape, this partly Norman church has a 13th-century chancel and a later tower. Sir Thomas Jackson's well-regarded renovation of 1868–69 rebuilt an aisle, porch and the south transept, all removed in 1800. The earliest work dates from the 1160s.	
St Mary's Church (More images)		Clapham; 50.8489°N 0.4446°W	Anglican	I	A simple downland church of the late Norman era, around the time of the transition to Early English Gothic, the church retains much 13th-century work despite a modest restoration in 1873. The flint building is aisled and has a hip-roofed tower.	
St Mary's Church (More images)		Climping; 50.8138°N 0.5778°W	Anglican	I	John Climping, a Bishop of Chichester, is the likely founder of this early-13th-century church, about which an ancient Sussex rhyme claims "Climping for perfection". The base of the tower, built in the 1170s, is remarkable for its flamboyance, and a deeply zigzag-moulded window above is unique. The impressive interior has many old fixtures.	
St Mary's Church (More images)		East Preston; 50.8125°N 0.4896°W	Anglican	I	The simple nave and chancel of this church are mostly 13th-century; an earlier doorway survives in the nave. The tower is slightly later and is Perpendicular Gothic in style. George Gilbert Scott restored the church and added an aisle in 1869, and the spire on the tower was removed in 1951.	
Church of Our Lady Star of the Sea (More images)		East Preston; 50.8087°N 0.4798°W	Roman Catholic	–	Initially served from Angmering, this is now the only church in the joint parish. The first building, now the church hall, dates from 1957; an extension built in 1987 created a new church adjoining this. Its tile-clad pyramid roof hides a square building. The church was registered for worship in August 1958, and its marriage registration dates from May 1960.	
St George's Church (More images)		Eastergate; 50.8377°N 0.6591°W	Anglican	II*	This aisleless Norman church was extensively renovated in the Victorian era: many ancient windows were replaced in particular (although one survives in the north wall). Norman-era herringbone brickwork is evident on the chancel wall. Some 14th-century stained glass survives.	
St Mary's Church (More images)		Felpham; 50.7907°N 0.6545°W	Anglican	II*	The original small 12th-century church has grown steadily over the centuries, gaining aisles, a 14th-century chancel, 15th-century castellated tower, porch and vestry. The clerestory is an unusual survivor from the 13th century. Poet William Hayley is commemorated inside.	
Kingdom Hall (More images)		Felpham; 50.7962°N 0.6366°W	Jehovah's Witnesses	–	This Kingdom Hall stands on Flansham Lane. It was registered for marriages in August 1987, and is used by the Bognor Regis Congregation of Jehovah's Witnesses. Its predecessor, a hall in part of a building on Gloucester Road in Bognor Regis town centre, was registered between April 1955 and August 1987.	
Felpham Methodist Church (More images)		Felpham; 50.7937°N 0.6388°W	Methodist	–	A former Society of Dependants chapel was used for Methodist services from 1932 until 1939, when the present red-brick church opened nearby. It was registered for worship in September of that year. The original capacity was 200, and the building was extended in 1985.	
Brethren Meeting Room (More images)		Felpham; 50.7939°N 0.6373°W	Plymouth Brethren Christian Church	–	Members of the Plymouth Brethren Christian Church now use this former school on Middleton Road, which was converted into a Roman Catholic church (dedicated to St Peregrine) in 1934. It was still used by that denomination until about 2003, and the Brethren bought it in mid-2008.	
St Andrew's Church (More images)		Ferring; 50.8125°N 0.4481°W	Anglican	I	The flint chancel is mid-13th-century (although Norman fabric remains, and the windows are later) and a roughcast nave was built in the 17th century. A well-proportioned interior and a tiled belfry contribute to the church's "soft village character".	
Ferring Baptist Church (More images)		Ferring; 50.8135°N 0.4491°W	Baptist	–	The village received its second church in 1973 when this modern-style building opened on Greystoke Road. It can hold 140 worshippers, and there were 73 recorded members in 1985. It was registered for worship and for marriages in May 1973.	
St John the Baptist's Church (More images)		Findon; 50.8648°N 0.4138°W	Anglican	I	A church existed at the time of the Domesday survey in 1086, but the present fabric is mostly 12th- and 13th-century. The flint and stone building apparently had apsidal transepts originally. Giles Gilbert Scott's restoration of 1866–68 affected the fittings more than the exterior. The king post timber roof is 15th-century.	
St Andrew's Church (More images)		Ford; 50.8243°N 0.5780°W	Anglican	I	This "very attractive small church" is set in a large churchyard next to the River Arun: its weatherboarded bell-turret was painted white as a navigational aid for ships. Most of the fabric is Norman, but a distinctive semicircular-gabled brick porch was added to the flint and pebble exterior in 1637 and some restoration took place in 1865. A vestry was added in about 1900.	
St Nicholas' Church (More images)		Houghton; 50.8947°N 0.5506°W	Anglican	II*	The present appearance of this simple single-cell building is attributable to a careful renovation in 1857. The aisleless nave and chancel form the body of the building, which also has a bellcot and an entrance porch. The church dates from the 13th century.	
St Mary's Church (More images)		Littlehampton; 50.8090°N 0.5387°W	Anglican	II	George Draper rebuilt the medieval parish church in flint in the Gothic Revival style in 1826, and it was remodelled again in 1899 by William White, who added a chancel in brick. Another rebuilding, this time by William H.R. Blacking in 1934–35 (in red brick and stone), gave the church an "eerie, disembodied Gothic" look.	
St James's Church (More images)		Littlehampton; 50.8124°N 0.5440°W	Anglican	–	New housing around the Arundel Road encouraged the founding of a church, of the same Anglo-Catholic character as the parish church, in 1899. Architects Wheeler and Godman replaced the temporary structure with the present flint and brick Gothic Revival-style church in 1908–10. An intended chancel was never added, and neither was a hall planned in 1949; the west wall is therefore plain. The font, reredos and lectern came from St Mary's Church.	
Littlehampton Baptist Church (More images)		Littlehampton; 50.8084°N 0.5375°W	Baptist	–	Baptists first met in the town in 1908. They moved from their temporary home in a hall to this stone-dressed red-brick "late medieval-style" chapel in 1910 and registered it for worship in October of that year. Subsequent enlargement was needed to cater for ever increasing membership, which exceeded 200 by 1985.	
Parkside Evangelical Church (More images)		Littlehampton; 50.8097°N 0.5313°W	Evangelical	–	Argyll Hall, by the river, was the town's first Evangelical chapel. The land was needed for roadbuilding in 1972, so the council helped the congregation move to a new site on St Flora's Road, where the present brick building was opened in 1973. It was recorded as a Brethren chapel in 1975, and when registered in June 1973 it was also described as Christian Brethren.	
Friends Meeting House (More images)		Littlehampton; 50.8097°N 0.5390°W	Quaker	II	A Mrs Welch founded a Dissenters' "Penny School" in 1835 on Church Street. Up to 65 pupils were on the roll, but it went out of use and was taken on by a succession of religious groups: Baptists, the Salvation Army and (from 1925) Exclusive Brethren. Quakers acquired it in 1965. The "fine" cobbled flint façade has some grey brickwork and pointed-arched windows with inset lancets.	
St Catherine's Church (More images)		Littlehampton; 50.8060°N 0.5396°W	Roman Catholic	II	The Duchess of Norfolk paid for this church, which was founded in 1862–63 and rebuilt to Matthew Ellison Hadfield's French Gothic Revival design in 1883 (when an aisle and a Lady chapel were added). As one of the earliest Roman Catholic churches in Sussex, it initially served a large area—as far as Bognor Regis, Ferring and Westergate. The exterior has gables, lancets and rose windows, and there is much marblework inside.	
Littlehampton United Church (More images)		Littlehampton; 50.8099°N 0.5442°W	United Reformed/Methodist	–	J.G. Stapleton's stone Early English-style church of 1861 was built for Congregationalists. Transepts were built in 1874, and the roof has a turret-like spire. Since 1980, the church has been shared with Methodists, whose three former churches were at Terminus Road (1825–1898; demolished 1981), New Road (1896–1980; demolished 1982) and Wick (1876–1968; demolished 1968).	
St Mary Magdalene's Church (More images)		Lyminster; 50.8335°N 0.5490°W	Anglican	I	Lyminster's parish church retains some Saxon work in the nave and chancel, although successive alterations in the 13th, 15th and 19th centuries changed its appearance. An arcade in the nave demonstrates the transition from Norman to early Gothic architecture. The castellated tower is Early English/Perpendicular Gothic.	
St Mary Magdalene's Church (More images)		Madehurst; 50.8810°N 0.6015°W	Anglican	II*	Although its origins are medieval, this remote church was effectively reconstructed in 1864 by Sir Thomas Jackson. The north aisle dates from then, but the chancel and nave retain their original layout. The tower has prominent buttresses.	
St Nicholas' Church (More images)		Middleton-on-Sea; 50.7942°N 0.6146°W	Anglican	–	The original church of this dedication was 13th-century and stood the site of an older one. Coastal erosion in the 18th century destroyed the graveyard and later the building itself: little remained by 1838, when a high tide wrecked it, and the ruins were removed by the time the new church was built nearby in 1849. The single-cell building was extended in 1929, 1949 and 1978.	
Holy Cross Church (More images)		North Bersted; 50.8005°N 0.6930°W	Anglican	–	This Early English Gothic Revival church is built of flint with some stonework. It was extended in 1971, but its distinctive west-end spire was taken down in 1977. It was originally a mission church, founded as a chapel of ease to St Mary Magdalene's Church at South Bersted. Sources vary as to its construction date, claiming either 1894 or 1904.	
Brethren Meeting Room		North Bersted; 50.8001°N 0.6959°W	Plymouth Brethren Christian Church	–	This meeting hall behind Chalcraft Lane was registered for worship in December 1970 and for marriages in June 1995. A sawmill on the site was converted into a place of worship in 1969.	
Gospel Hall		Norton, Aldingbourne; 50.8475°N 0.6874°W	Plymouth Brethren Christian Church	–	Planning permission for this meeting room, built alongside some plant nurseries, was granted in 2006. It was licensed for marriages in December 2007.	
Pagham United Reformed Church (More images)		Nyetimber; 50.7775°N 0.7386°W	United Reformed	–	The Presbyterian Church of England became part of the United Reformed Church in 1972. Eight years earlier, a congregation began meeting for worship in commercial premises in Pagham (and briefly a cricket pavilion), before building this new church in 1966. It was formally registered four years later. Originally called St Ninian's Church, it was renamed in 2010.	
St Thomas a Becket's Church (More images)		Pagham; 50.7701°N 0.7482°W	Anglican	I	The dedication of this large harbourside church is sometimes given as St Thomas the Martyr. There are transepts and aisles on the north and south sides of the nave; the north aisle is attached to the tower, which has a shingled spire. Vestries and a 19th-century porch make up the rest of the cruciform structure. It was heavily restored in 1837 by John Elliott.	
St John the Divine's Church (More images)		Patching; 50.8486°N 0.4570°W	Anglican	I	For many years a chapel linked to St Andrew's Church, West Tarring, this ancient flint and stone building is now administratively united with neighbouring Clapham. Repeated restorations in the 19th centuries, latterly by Henry Woodyer (1888–89), were responsible for the current appearance of the small church, which has a chancel, nave, porch, vestry and side tower with a shingle-hung spire.	
St Nicholas' Church (More images)		Poling; 50.8315°N 0.5146°W	Anglican	I	This village church has experienced little restoration and has a mostly Saxon nave with an early-13th-century aisle on the south side. The chancel and "particularly good" tower are later additions, and the entrance porch is 19th-century.	
Aldwick Free Church (More images)		Rose Green, Aldwick; 50.7841°N 0.7145°W	Baptist	–	This church in the Rose Green area of Aldwick is home to a congregation of Evangelical Baptists. With the name Aldwick Baptist Church it was registered for worship in June 1938 and for marriages the following July.	
St Anthony of Viareggio's Church (More images)		Rose Green, Aldwick; 50.7847°N 0.7160°W	Roman Catholic	–	This church in the parish of Bognor Regis is a converted bungalow, left in a will to the town's Servite friars. It was consecrated in May 1963 and registered for worship and for marriages eight years later. Antonio Maria Pucci (Anthony of Viareggio), to whom it is dedicated, was himself in the Servite Order.	
St Peter and St Paul's Church (More images)		Rustington; 50.8105°N 0.5103°W	Anglican	II	This Transitional Norman–Early English Gothic church retains its 12th-century tower with a contemporary arch and octagonal columns. The chancel is 13th-century, and much of the building dates from then or the following century. Little restoration has taken place.	
Kingdom Hall (More images)		Rustington; 50.8105°N 0.5121°W	Jehovah's Witnesses	–	The present building was originally a Christian Science reading room. Local Jehovah's Witnesses acquired it and converted it into a Kingdom Hall in 1962, and it continues to serve the denomination's Rustington Congregation. It was registered for worship in June 1962 and for marriages in October 1968.	
Rustington Methodist Church (More images)		Rustington; 50.8100°N 0.5084°W	Methodist	–	The present brick building of 1952, registered in October of that year and extended in 1975–76, is the town's third place of Methodist worship. A cottage served between 1875 and 1878, then a converted forge was used. Road improvements forced its demolition. The 1970s extension gave the congregation an attached hall and community centre.	
St Joseph's Church (More images)		Rustington; 50.8132°N 0.5009°W	Roman Catholic	–	Provision was made for Roman Catholic worship in Rustington in the 1940s, when the priest of Angmering travelled to celebrate Mass in the village hall. The present red-brick church, with a small corner bell-turret with a flat, large cap, dates from 1951. John D. Hicks was the architect. Registered for worship in July of that year, it was also licensed for marriages the following July.	
St Andrew's Church (More images)		Rustington; 50.8081°N 0.5147°W	United Reformed	–	Assistance from the Presbyterian church in Worthing helped a congregation to develop in Rustington in the 1950s. A Scout hut and a school were used for worship until the present low, steep-roofed building was erected in 1960–61. Additions were made in 1964. The church was registered for worship and for marriages in April 1961.	
St Mary's Church (More images)		Slindon; 50.8667°N 0.6357°W	Anglican	I	Sir Thomas Jackson's restoration of 1866 has been called "shocking", but some 11th-century work has been preserved in the nave. The church was lengthened in the 13th century, and the square font dates from that time. A well-regarded 16th-century wooden monument (the only such effigy in Sussex) inside the church commemorates Anthony St Leger.	
St Richard's Church (More images)		Slindon; 50.8680°N 0.6360°W	Roman Catholic	II	Bertel Thorvaldsen's miniature carving of Anthony James Radclyffe, 5th Earl of Newburgh, a piece with "great sculptural force", is inside Charles Alban Buckler's Early English-style flint church of 1865. The area's strong Roman Catholic tradition is reflected in the presence of a secret chapel at Slindon House, recorded from 1695 and used until the church was opened.	
St Mary Magdalene's Church (More images)		South Bersted; 50.7940°N 0.6751°W	Anglican	II*	The restoration of 1879–81 by Ewan Christian gives the rubble and ashlar church a solid appearance, as does the massively buttressed 13th-century tower. This is topped with a shingle-clad broach spire. The five-bay nave has lancet windows. The east window has colourful stained glass of 1880 by Hardman & Co.	
St Leonard's Church (More images)		South Stoke; 50.8807°N 0.5421°W	Anglican	I	The church existed at the time of the Domesday survey in 1086 and is still largely an 11th-century structure, although some restoration work was carried out in the Victorian era. There is a very narrow tower with a spire (added in the 19th century). The chancel and nave are unaisled, and there is a "lavish" porch on the south side.	
St Mary's Church (More images)		Walberton; 50.8430°N 0.6216°W	Anglican	I	The original Saxon building incorporated stones salvaged from Roman sites. It was associated with Boxgrove Priory until the 16th century, but declined thereafter and was restored in the 18th, 19th and 20th centuries. Richard Creed, a Victorian architect responsible for some of this work, has been criticised for his "clumsy" handling. There is a Saxon coffin inside.	
Walberton Baptist Church (More images)		Walberton; 50.8460°N 0.6230°W	Baptist	–	A Baptist congregation developed in the 1840s, with help from Worthing's church, and put up a chapel in 1847. This was replaced by the "imposing" building of 1886 which stands on the south side of the High Street (now opposite a 1950s church hall). It is partly tile-hung and features flint and polychrome brickwork. In 1973, the congregation became aligned to the FIEC. The capacity is 100. The building was not formally registered for worship until July 1920.	
Westergate Methodist Church (More images)		Westergate; 50.8404°N 0.6688°W	Methodist	–	Methodists in this part of Aldingbourne parish first worshipped in a former barn in 1851. This building served them until 1962, but it was converted into a house and a new church was built nearby in 1962. It was registered for worship in February of that year and for marriages three months later.	
All Saints Church		Wick; 50.8205°N 0.5435°W	Anglican	–	W.C. Street's chapel of ease to Lyminster parish church dates from 1882. The roof has a bellcot and there is a polygonal apse. The brick, flint and stone church, an Early English-style building with a capacity of 200, gained its own parish in 1973, and is now within a joint benefice with Littlehampton's two Anglican churches.	
Arun Community Church (Wickbourne Centre) (More images)		Wick; 50.8142°N 0.5478°W	Evangelical	–	Littlehampton's first Evangelical church, Argyll Hall, founded Wickbourne Chapel in the late 1950s. It was built in 1959 and served the Wick housing estate until 2004, when it was demolished and replaced by the Wickbourne Centre—a multi-use community and worship building funded by the Government's Sure Start programme. The WIRE project has been based at the church since 1996. The registration of the original chapel was carried over to the new building.	
St Mary's Church (More images)		Yapton; 50.8231°N 0.6076°W	Anglican	I	This church dates almost entirely from the period 1180 to 1220, including the tower which has been repeatedly shored up and buttressed because of structural problems. The nave aisles are so low that the roofs are only 5 feet (1.5 m) above the ground outside, and dormer windows were inserted in the 17th century. A medieval timber-framed porch stands on the west side.	
Yapton Evangelical Free Church (More images)		Yapton; 50.8209°N 0.6156°W	Evangelical	II	There was a Congregational chapel at this location in 1848. The present building—home to an Evangelical congregation since 1973—dates from 1861. It has a flint and stone exterior, arched windows, bargeboards and an adjoining gabled hall forming an L-shaped wing.	
Brethren Meeting Room (More images)		Yapton; 50.8216°N 0.6151°W	Plymouth Brethren Christian Church	–	Proposals to convert the site of a former pub in Yapton into flats and a Gospel hall were announced in October 2014. A planning application was raised in summer 2015, and the building now serves as a local meeting room for members of the Plymouth Brethren Christian Church associated with the main Gospel hall at Aldingbourne.	

== Former places of worship ==
Former places of worship
Name	Image	Location	Denomination/ Affiliation	Grade	Notes	Refs
Church of Christ (More images)		Angmering; 50.8272°N 0.4860°W	Baptist	II	This "strangely towered" 150-capacity chapel was founded with the name Church of Christ in 1846 by George Paul of Worthing, from where its first minister also came. By the 1960s it was in poor condition and was sold for conversion into two houses in about 1970, when the new Baptist church opened nearby. The old chapel, a flint and brick building, has lancet windows, and a four-storey corner tower rises to a pyramidal cap. It was formally registered for worship in August 1923 and for marriages in April 1948.	
St Wilfrid's Church (More images)		Angmering; 50.8307°N 0.4859°W	Roman Catholic	–	Opened as a mission chapel by priests at Arundel, this served Angmering from 1872 until 1995. The congregation transferred to East Preston's Roman Catholic church after that, and the red-brick and stone Gothic Revival building was incorporated into the adjacent St Wilfrid's School. It was not officially registered for worship until 1884.	
Arun Street Baptist Chapel		Arundel; 50.8534°N 0.5573°W	Baptist	–	Baptists in Arundel moved from an 1846 chapel in Park Place to a new building on Arun Street in 1868. The two-storey Vernacular chapel was built on the site of a former Quaker meeting house. Served from Worthing for most of its existence, it closed in 1967 and was converted into a shop, then a house.	
Trinity Church (More images)		Arundel; 50.8539°N 0.5555°W	United Reformed	II	The Romanesque Revival exterior of this flint-built chapel, described as "not good" by Ian Nairn, dates from 1836 to 1838, but the originally Independent congregation developed in 1780. Stone and red brick dressings are also in evidence. Its architect Robert Abraham also designed the town hall. The building, latterly known as Arundel United Reformed Church, became an antiques market in the 1980s. It was registered for marriages between April 1840 and August 1982, at which point it was known as Arundel Union Church.	
Bailiffscourt Chapel (More images)		Atherington; 50.7990°N 0.5793°W	Pre-Reformation	II*	Used intermittently for public services, including as late as 1952, this simple 13th-century Gothic building—a single-cell chapel with lancet windows—stands in the grounds of the luxury Bailiffscourt Hotel. It was originally the private chapel of the manor house, owned by the bailiff of the Abbey of Séez in Normandy.	
Barnham Methodist Church (More images)		Barnham; 50.8302°N 0.6373°W	Methodist	–	Now in commercial use, this arched-windowed brick and stucco chapel was still in use until the early 21st century by Methodists whose origins lay in a congregation based in Eastergate in the 1920s. The building was registered for worship in December 1930, completed in 1931 and registered for marriages in June 1938. It seated more than 100 people and was latterly served from Littlehampton.	
St Philip Howard's Chapel		Barnham; 50.8338°N 0.6449°W	Roman Catholic	–	A wooden church stood near the railway goods yard from 1938 until the 1970s. A new chapel at the nearby Roman Catholic secondary school was opened for public worship in 1970 and was registered in March of that year; it was part of the parish of Slindon, but closed to the public in the early 21st century.	
Bilsham Chapel (More images)		Bilsham; 50.8101°N 0.6215°W	Pre-Reformation	II	This single-cell sandstone and flint chapel of ease to Yapton parish church dates from the 13th and 14th centuries: the oldest fabric is from the 1260s. It was already disused by 1551 and became cottages, then a shed, then (in 1972) a single house. Various restorations were carried out in the 19th century.	
First Church of Christ, Scientist, Bognor Regis (More images)		Bognor Regis; 50.7859°N 0.6741°W	Christian Science	–	This building is now the Regis Recital Hall, but it was built for Christian Scientists in 1957 on a World War II bomb site. The building has a red Somerset tile façade and a polychrome tiled area outside. It opened on 23 June 1957, replacing an earlier (1930) place of worship, and was registered for worship the following April.	
Bognor Regis United Reformed Church (More images)		Bognor Regis; 50.7876°N 0.6798°W	United Reformed	–	A small flint church served the town's Congregationalists from 1866 until 1929, after which S.T. Hennell's new larger building (completed in 1930 and registered in July 1931) was used. It closed in July 2010 and was formally deregistered in November 2011; the congregation joined the sister church at Pagham. The brick and stone building is Decorated/Perpendicular Gothic Revival. The building is now a community centre, but part of it is used by another church congregation (see above).	
Nepcote Chapel (More images)		Findon; 50.8628°N 0.4014°W	Baptist	–	The part of Findon village known as Nepcote was served by a small chapel, used in around 1865 by Plymouth Brethren and later by Baptists, which was then replaced in 1881 by the present building of flint and brick to the design of Thomas G. Graham. Worthing Baptist Church administered it, and the congregation moved to a newly built chapel in Findon Valley in 1940. Evangelicals used it later for a time, registering it for worship and for marriages in November 1948.	
Church of St Edmund, Archbishop (More images)		Houghton; 50.8957°N 0.5487°W	Roman Catholic	–	This red-brick building was opened in 1879 and licensed for marriages in 1894. It was served from Arundel and funded by the Dukes of Norfolk. The architectural style has been described as "school chapel". It closed in 1994 or 1995 and passed into commercial use as an auction gallery, but later became a house. It was sold at auction for £500,000 in June 2020. The dedication referred to Edmund of Abingdon, a 13th-century Archbishop of Canterbury.	
Siloam Methodist Chapel (More images)		Lagness; 50.7931°N 0.7125°W	Methodist	–	On the road from Bognor Regis to Chichester, this small red-brick chapel was opened in 1840. It has now been incorporated into a bed and breakfast establishment called The Old Chapel Forge.	
Lidsey Mission Hall		Lidsey, Aldingbourne; 50.8207°N 0.6689°W	Anglican	–	A mission room was built in this outlying part of Aldingbourne parish to serve Anglican worshippers. Recorded in the Kelly's Directory of 1909, it later passed into commercial use. Planning permission for a house on the site was refused in 2000.	
North Bersted United Reformed Church (More images)		North Bersted; 50.7975°N 0.6913°W	United Reformed	–	This Congregational chapel opened in 1936 in the Bognor Regis suburb of North Bersted and joined the United Reformed Church upon its formation in 1972. In 1986 it passed into the ownership of the Servite Priory, a Roman Catholic monastic order resident in the town, but is now in residential use. It was a registered place of worship between March 1938 and January 1988.	
Chapel at Barton Manor		Nyetimber; 50.7776°N 0.7333°W	Pre-Reformation	II	Barton Manor, now a luxury residential complex, is based around an ancient former manor house with its own 13th-century chapel. This flint building, now re-roofed but with original lancet windows, was apparently used as a place of worship by parishioners in the Nyetimber area of Pagham in the Middle Ages; the parish church lies 3/4 mile (1.2 km) away.	
St Mary Magdalene's Church (More images)		Tortington; 50.8357°N 0.5769°W	Anglican	II	This church, declared redundant in 1978, originally served the adjacent priory. A remarkable set of carvings, some depicting "boggle-eyed monsters", surround the doorway and the chancel arch. The building has mid-12th-century origins. The roof has a white wooden bell-turret.	
Walberton Baptist Chapel (More images)		Walberton; 50.8450°N 0.6203°W	Baptist	–	A Baptist congregation developed in the village in the 1840s and worshipped in this small building from 1847 until the new, larger Baptist Church was built nearby in 1886. The structure is now a garage, but it served as a Sunday school for part of the 20th century.	
St Barnabas Church		Warningcamp; 50.8484°N 0.5267°W	Anglican	–	Warningcamp School was licensed for religious services in 1863, and a chancel was added in 1890 by George Truefitt. The dedication to St Barnabas was recorded from 1904. The building was used solely as a church from 1923 until 1967, but it closed on 12 November that year and was sold for residential conversion in 1968.	
Westergate Mission Hall (More images)		Westergate; 50.8425°N 0.6676°W	Anglican	–	Apparently built in about October 1905 as a mission room for the parish church at Aldingbourne, this building later had various social functions (such as a Scout hut) until planning permission was granted in 2007 for its conversion into a house.	

== See also ==
- Grade I listed buildings in West Sussex
- List of churches preserved by the Churches Conservation Trust in Southeast England
- List of demolished places of worship in West Sussex
