= Angmering Baptist Church =

Church of Christ
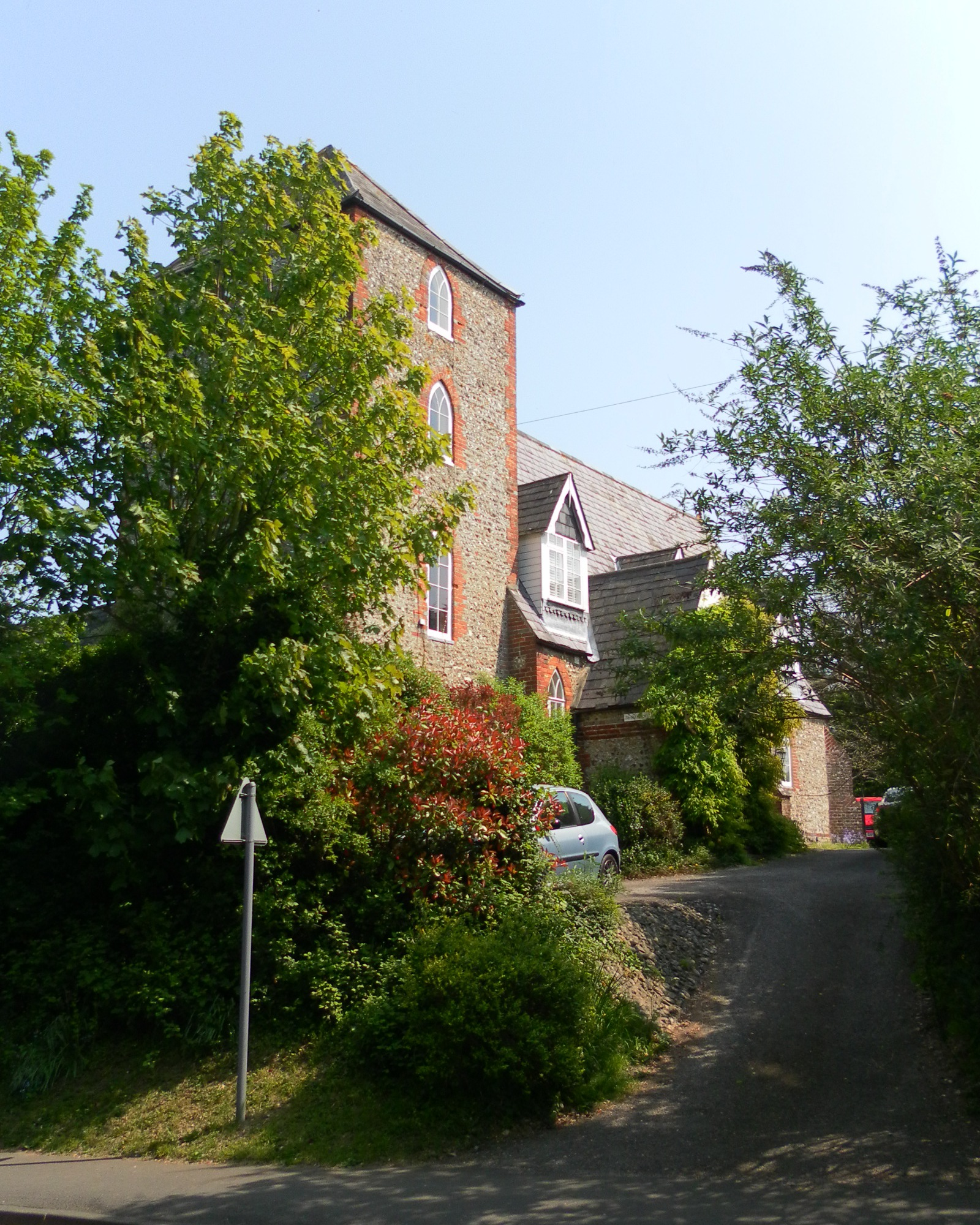
- The former chapel from the west

- Location within West Sussex
- 50.8272°N 0.4860°W
- Location: Station Road, Angmering, West Sussex BN16 4HN, England

History
- Founded: 1846
- Built: 1846
- Built for: George R. Paul

Site notes
- Architectural style: Gothic Revival
- Restored: 1970

Listed Building – Grade II
- Official name: The Former Baptist Church
- Designated: 20 September 1984
- Reference no.: 1027686

Angmering Baptist Church
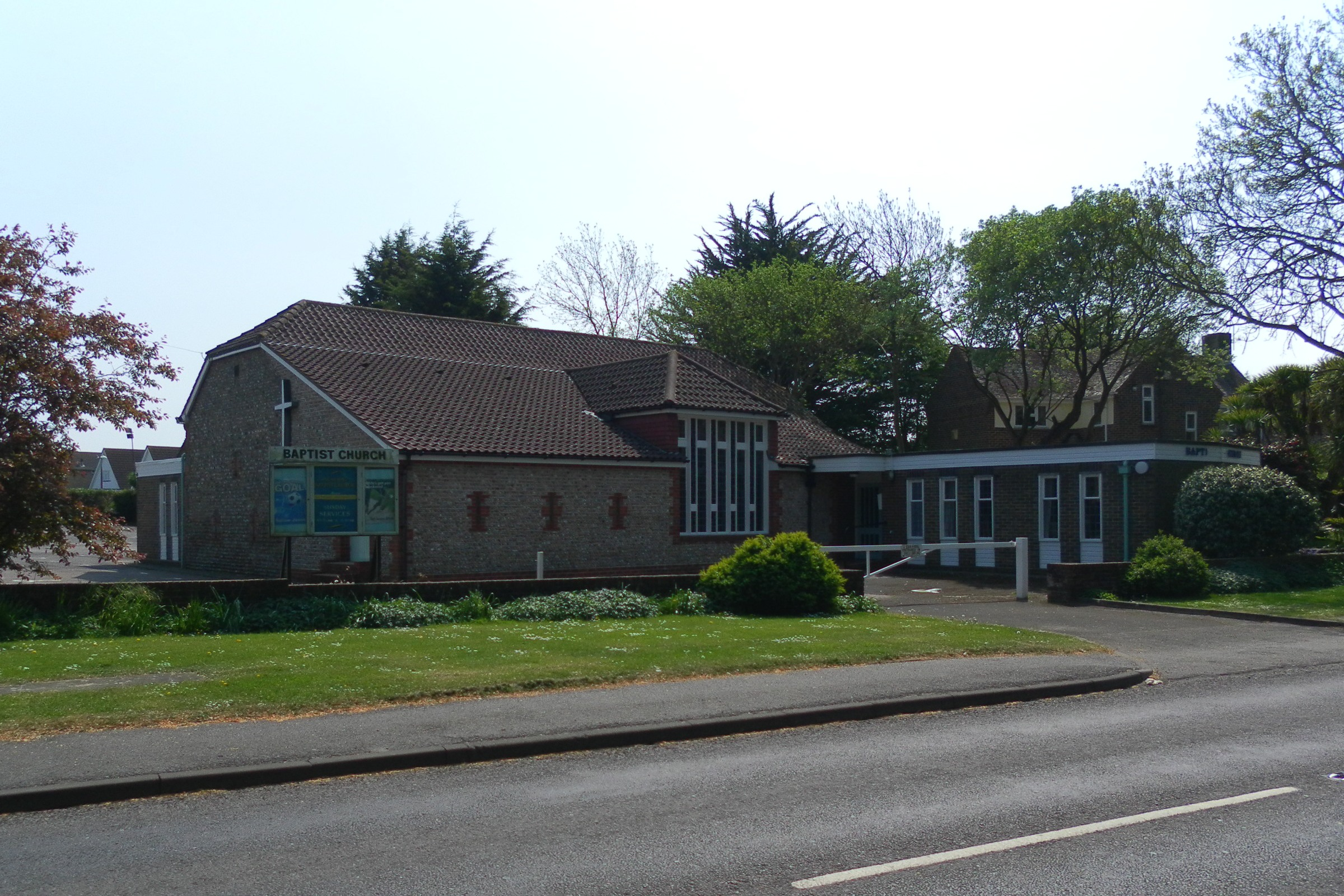
- The church from the northwest
- Angmering Baptist Church
- 50.8248°N 0.4865°W
- Location: Station Road, Angmering, West Sussex BN16 4HY
- Country: England
- Denomination: Baptist

History
- Status: Church
- Founded: 1970

Architecture
- Functional status: Active
- Architectural type: Converted barn
- Style: Vernacular
- Groundbreaking: 1970
- Completed: 4 July 1970

Administration
- Division: South Eastern Baptist Association
- District: West Sussex Network

The present Angmering Baptist Church and its predecessor building, known as Church of Christ, are respectively the current and former Baptist places of worship in Angmering, a village in the Arun district of West Sussex, England. Baptist worship in the area can be traced back to 1846, when the "strangely towered" Church of Christ was founded and built. After the Gothic-style chapel became unsuitable for modern requirements, the congregation acquired a nearby barn and converted it into a new church, after which the old building was sold for residential conversion. The church has been designated a Grade II listed building.

== History ==
The village of Angmering developed at the heart of a large inland parish near the ancient town of Arundel. The Dukes of Norfolk, owners of Arundel Castle, also held Angmering Park—"a richly wooded demesne of great beauty". The parish had three medieval churches, but only St Margaret's Church (originally the church of West Angmering) survives; those at East Angmering and Barpham had fallen into dereliction by the 16th century. A railway station served the village from 1846.

Protestant Nonconformism thrived in Sussex from the 17th century. Although denominations and movements such as Strict Baptists, General Baptists, Presbyterians, Quakers, Methodists and the Countess of Huntingdon's Connexion were particularly successful in East Sussex, many congregations and chapels were also founded in the west of the county, which was also a stronghold of Roman Catholicism. In particular, the town of Worthing, near Angmering, had several Nonconformist places of worship by the mid-19th century. George Robert Paul, a Worthing resident and the son of Sir John Dean Paul, 1st Baronet, founded a church with the name Church of Christ at the south end of Angmering village in 1846. Despite its name—suggestive of a link to the Restoration Movement—it was Baptist from the beginning. Paul was both its superintendent and its owner, and the chapel's first minister John Adams was also based in Worthing. The building was registered for public worship on 7 January 1847.

Paul still owned the chapel himself as a proprietary chapel until 1906, when a group of 14 trustees bought it for £325. The alternative name Angmering Chapel was also used later. The connection with Worthing, which had lapsed, resumed in 1923 when the chapel began to be served as a "preaching station" by ministers from Worthing's Christchurch Road Baptist Church, which opened in 1881 and helped to establish or administer several Baptist chapels in the area. This arrangement continued until 1966.

By the 1960s, the building was no longer suitable for the requirements of modern worship as access was poor and there were few facilities. In 1967, Sir Herbert Janes, an Angmering resident who had founded and headed a civil engineering firm, helped find a site for a new church. A disused barn near the old chapel was available. Janes helped to pay for its purchase and conversion into a place of worship. Like the original chapel, this had a capacity of 150. The first service at the new Angmering Baptist Church was held on 4 July 1970. Its membership was recorded as 87 in 1985. Extensions were added in 1984 (a church hall), 1994 (to the church building itself) and 2005 (a new entrance). The former chapel was sold for restoration and conversion into two houses; the former graveyard forms the garden of one of them, and the headstones were moved to the new church.

Administratively, the present church is part of the West Sussex Network of the South Eastern Baptist Association. Other churches in this network are at Aldwick, Arundel, Bognor Regis, Broadwater, Chichester, Durrington, East Worthing, Ferring, Findon Valley, Goring-by-Sea, Littlehampton, West Worthing and Worthing.

Under the name The Former Baptist Church, the former Church of Christ building was designated a Grade II listed building on 20 September 1984.

The present Angmering Baptist Church was licensed for worship in accordance with the Places of Worship Registration Act 1855 on 21 July 1970 and has the registration number 72227. On the same date it was licensed for solemnising marriages according to the terms of the Marriage Act 1949, and the old chapel's licence was simultaneously cancelled.

== Architecture ==
The old chapel is a "strangely towered" Gothic Revival building of flint with red-brick quoins and window surrounds. Its most distinctive feature is the tall four-storey rectangular tower at the west end—an unusual architectural feature for a Baptist chapel. The tower has one pointed-arched lancet window on each storey and a pyramid-shaped slate spire. The rest of the roof is also laid with slate.

The body of the building is a single storey high. Its two casement windows are set in brick-dressed pointed arches. The entrance is set in a gabled porch. An extension built in the late 19th century stands on the northwest side. The chapel stands on high ground overlooking the adjacent road, and is only accessible by steps from the road.

== See also ==
- List of places of worship in Arun

== Notes ==
=== Bibliography ===
- Black, Adam; Black, Charles (2000) [1861]. Black's 1861 Guide to Sussex (Facsimile of original publication). Black's Guides: South-Eastern Counties of England. Bakewell: Country Books. ISBN 1-898941-21-1.
- Body, Geoffrey (1984). Railways of the Southern Region. PSL Field Guides. Cambridge: Patrick Stephens Ltd. ISBN 0-85059-664-5.
- Elleray, D. Robert (2004). Sussex Places of Worship. Worthing: Optimus Books. ISBN 0-9533132-7-1.
- Lewis, C.P., ed. (2009). A History of the County of Sussex: Volume 5 Part 2. Littlehampton and District (Arundel Rape, South-Eastern Part, comprising Poling Hundred). Victoria County History. Vol. 5 (ii). Woodbridge: Boydell Press. ISBN 978-1-904356-19-6.
- Stell, Christopher (2002). Nonconformist Chapels and Meeting-houses in Eastern England. Swindon: English Heritage. ISBN 1-873592-50-7.
