= Bilsham Chapel =

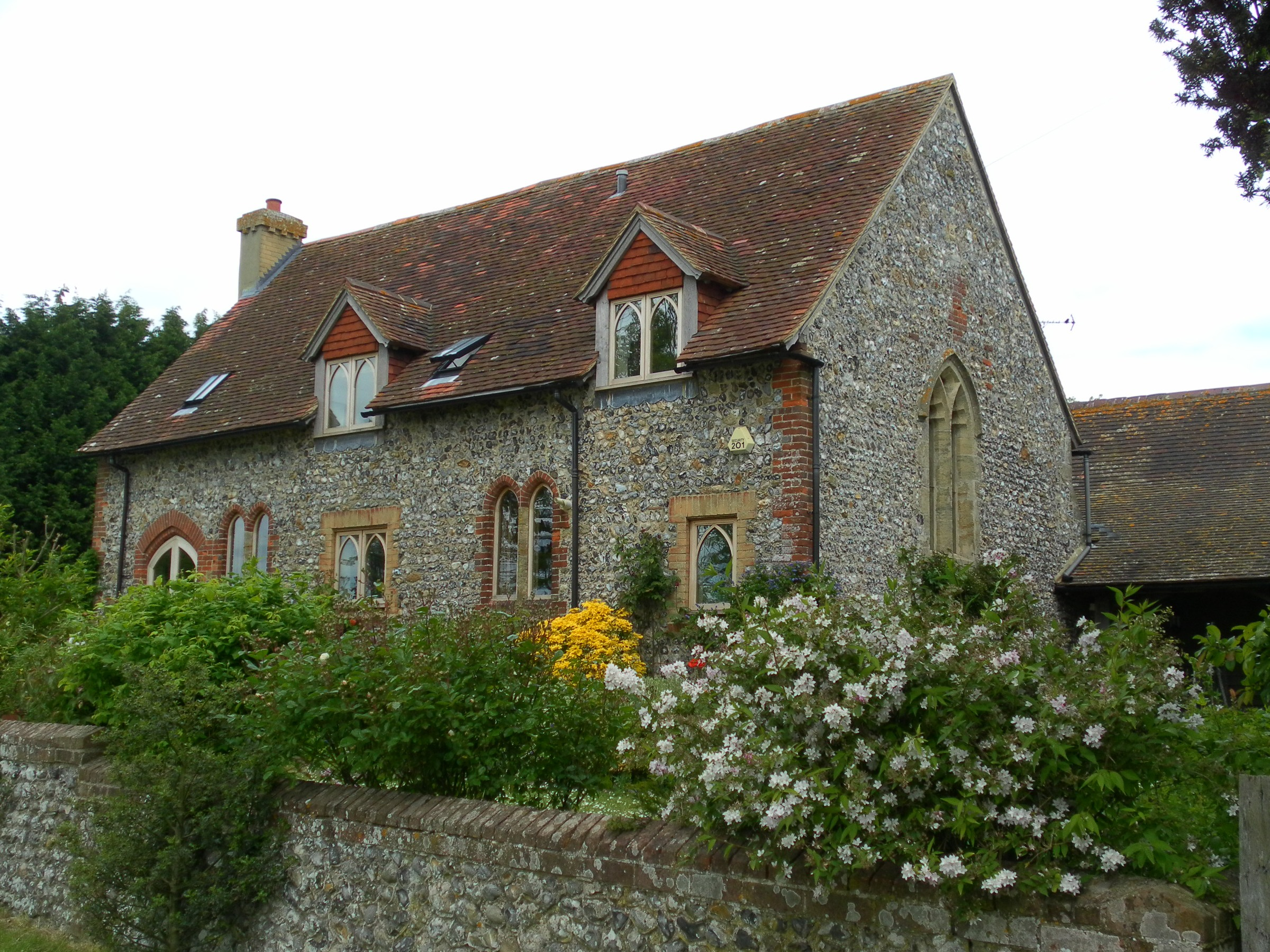
- The former chapel from the southeast
- Bilsham Chapel
- 50.8101°N 0.6215°W
- Location: Bilsham Lane, Bilsham, Yapton, West Sussex BN18 0JX
- Country: England
- Denomination: Pre-Reformation church

History
- Status: Chapel of ease
- Founded: 13th century
- Dedication: None recorded

Architecture
- Functional status: Residential conversion
- Heritage designation: Grade II
- Designated: 5 June 1958
- Style: Gothic
- Closed: c. 1550

Bilsham Chapel is a deconsecrated former chapel in the hamlet of Bilsham in West Sussex, England. Founded in the 13th century as a chapel of ease to the parish church of Yapton, the nearest village, the small flint building fell out of religious use around the time of the Reformation. It has subsequently been used for storage and as labourers' cottages, and since 1972 it has been a single residential property. English Heritage has listed it at Grade II for its architectural and historical importance.

== History ==
Bilsham, a hamlet within the parish of Yapton on the West Sussex coastal plain, is 3/4 mile (1.2 km) southwest of the village centre and its parish church. Evidence of Anglo-Saxon settlement has been found around the single-street settlement, which has grown northwards towards Yapton in the 20th century. The manor of Bilsham, one of several in Yapton parish, was mentioned in the Domesday survey of 1086.

No place of worship existed at Bilsham until the 13th century. The earliest surviving features of the present building, on the north side of Bilsham Lane, are a pair of windows which have been dated to the 13th century (or, by Nikolaus Pevsner, specifically to the 1260s). Other sources suggest they may be 14th-century, contemporary with the pointed-arched east window.

The chapel was never dedicated to any saint. During the religious upheaval of the 16th century, rural chapels of ease were usually either upgraded to full parochial status or taken out of religious use. The latter happened at Bilsham: the chapel was closed in around 1551. Nothing is known about the building's use for the next three centuries, but a study of West Sussex churches in 1860 noted that it had been "converted into two tenements" for workers. This may have happened in around 1840. One wall was rebuilt in brick at this time, and more structural alterations were carried out in 1878. The pair of cottages were converted into a shed before 1965, but the building became residential again when it was turned into a single house, described as a "homely dwelling", in 1972.

Under the name The Chapel, Bilsham Chapel was listed at Grade II by English Heritage on 5 June 1958. This defines it as a "nationally important" building of "special interest". As of February 2001, it was one of 913 Grade II listed buildings, and 960 listed buildings of all grades, in the local government district of Arun.

== Architecture ==
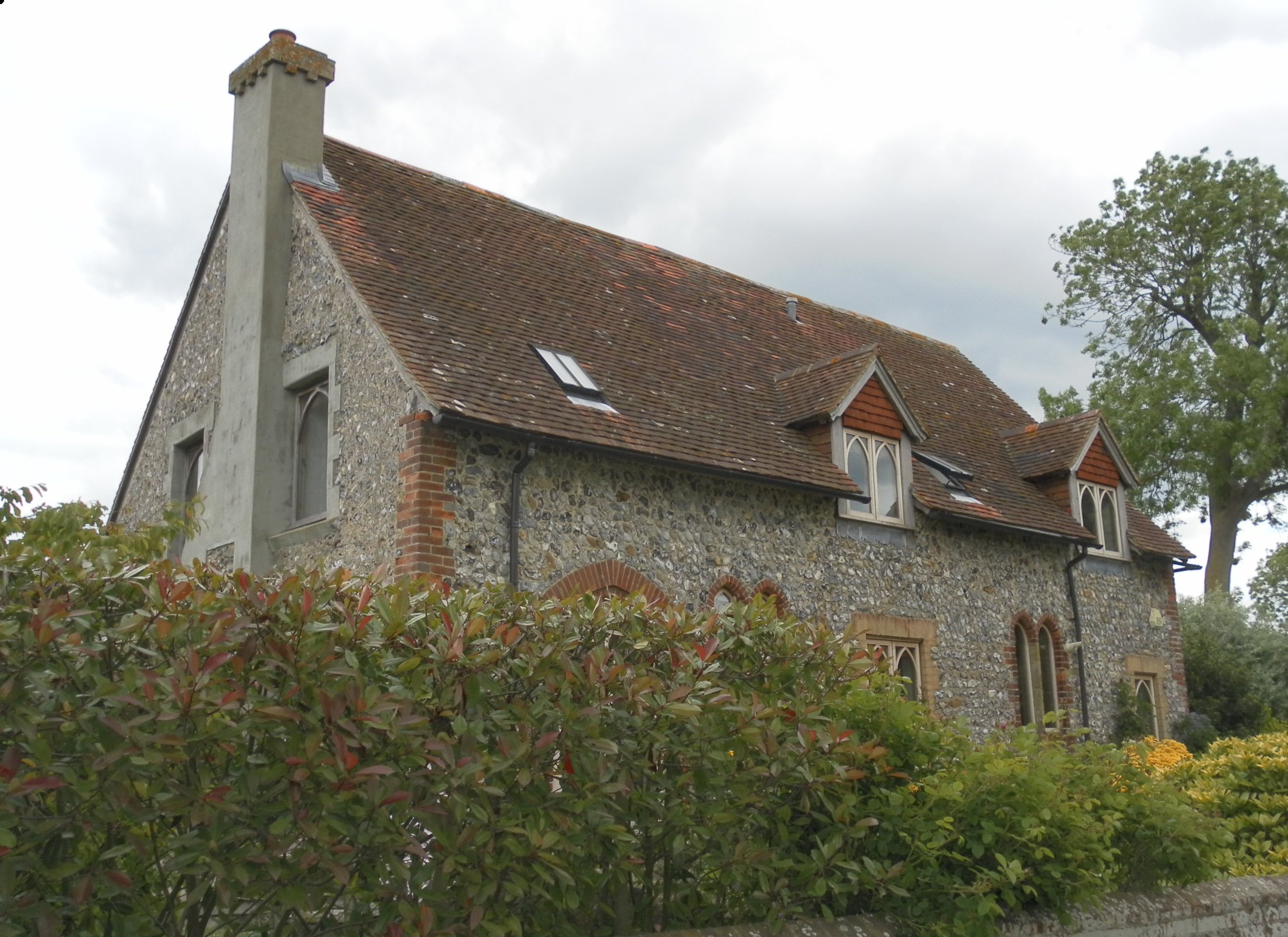
Several modern windows have been inserted on the west (left) and south sides.

The small rectangular building was always a single-cell chapel with no internal division. It has two storeys and walls of flint and sandstone with red-brick quoins and window dressings. The oldest structural features are the two lancet windows in the north wall, which have y-tracery in a style typical of the early 14th century. The pointed-arched lancet in the east wall has two lights and is either 14th- or 15th-century. Two pairs of single-light lancets with red-brick surrounds were added in the south wall during the 1878 renovations, which also added a timber roof with tie-beams. The two simple windows in the west wall may have been inserted then as well. A pair of dormers on the south side date from the 1972 conversion into a house. A survey in 1860 noted that the original arched entrance on the north side was blocked, and described the "three solid stone buttresses" on that side. At that time, markings in the adjacent field (then part of Bilsham Farm) still identified the limits of the former churchyard, which was said to be large.

== See also ==
- List of places of worship in Arun
