= Littlehampton Friends Meeting House =

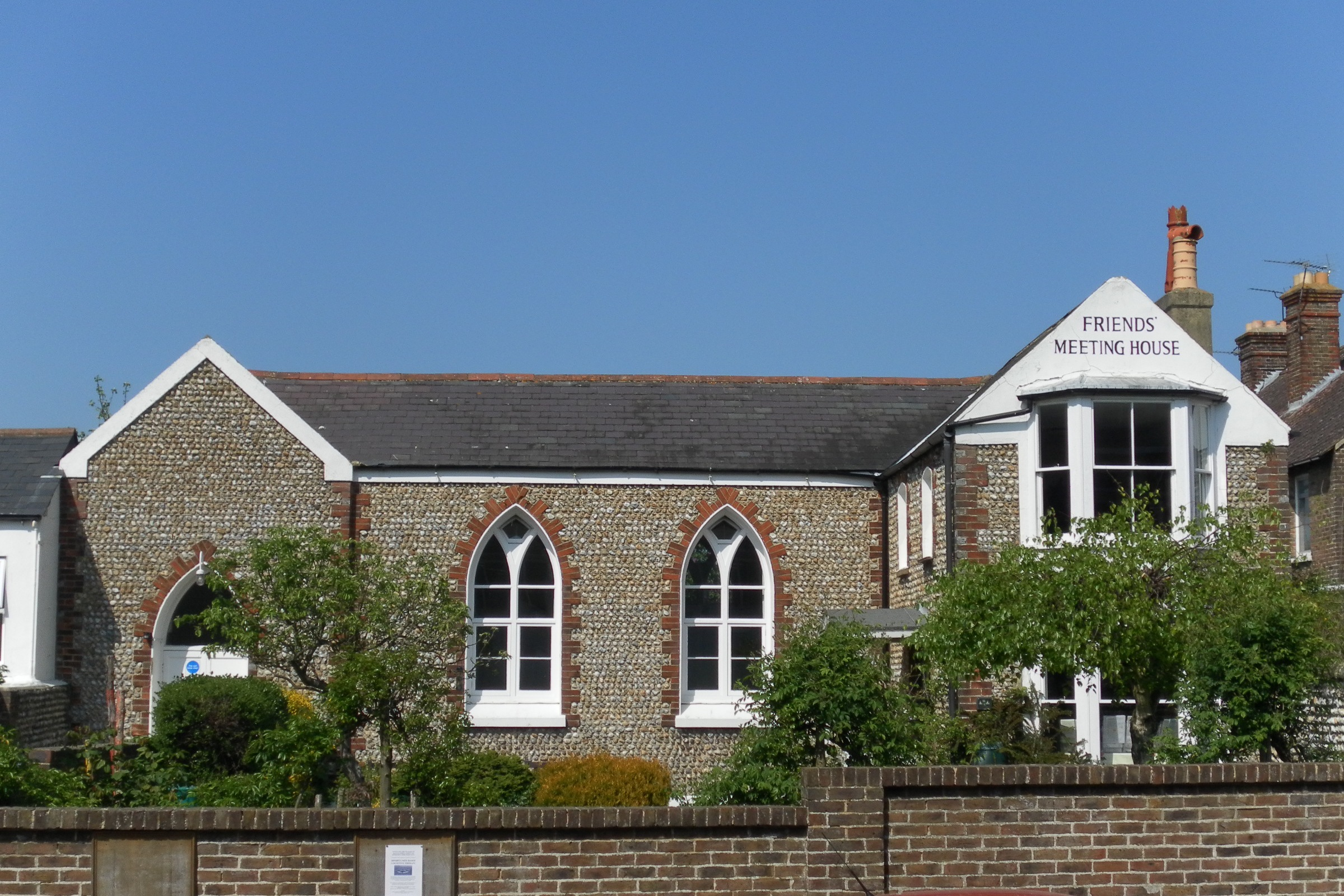
- The meeting house from the south

- Location in West Sussex
- 50°48′35″N 0°32′20″W
- Location: 23 Church Street, Littlehampton, West Sussex BN17 5EL
- Country: England
- Denomination: Quaker
- Website: www.littlehamptonquakers.org.uk/

History
- Status: Meeting house
- Founded: 1835 (as Penny School); 1965 (as Quaker meeting house)

Architecture
- Functional status: Active
- Heritage designation: Grade II
- Designated: 21 August 1975
- Completed: 1836

Littlehampton Friends Meeting House is a Religious Society of Friends (Quaker) place of worship in the town of Littlehampton, part of the Arun district of West Sussex, England. A Quaker community has worshipped in the seaside town since the 1960s, when they acquired a former Penny School building constructed in the early 19th century. The L-shaped, flint-faced structure, consisting of schoolrooms and a schoolmaster's house, has been converted into a place of worship at which weekly meetings take place. The house is a Grade II Listed building.

== History ==
The town of Littlehampton, at the estuary where the River Arun meets the English Channel, developed as a small port and seaside resort in the 19th century. By 1861, its population was 2,436, and "pleasant lodgings" were available fronting the beach, which was connected to the opposite bank of the river by ferries. St Mary's Church, the Anglican parish church, was rebuilt in 1826.

Education in the growing town was initially provided by private individuals. In 1835, a Mrs Welch founded a "Penny School"—apparently a type of Dame school—on the north side of Church Street. The L-shaped building had a single schoolroom and an attached schoolmaster's house at the east end. About 65 pupils were typically on the roll. The school, which was run by Dissenters rather than the Established Church, was completed and opened in 1836.

After the school fell out of use, it passed into religious use for the first time when Plymouth Brethren acquired it. Meanwhile, Quakers started meeting in Littlehampton in 1952. They sought a permanent meeting house, and bought the former school in 1965 (by which stage Brethren were meeting at Argyll Hall elsewhere in the town). Membership of the Littlehampton Friends Meeting was recorded as 20 people in 1985, and it is now described as a "large" meeting by the Religious Society of Friends themselves. Weekly meetings take place on Sunday mornings.

Littlehampton Friends Meeting House was designated a Grade II Listed building on 21 August 1975.

== Architecture ==
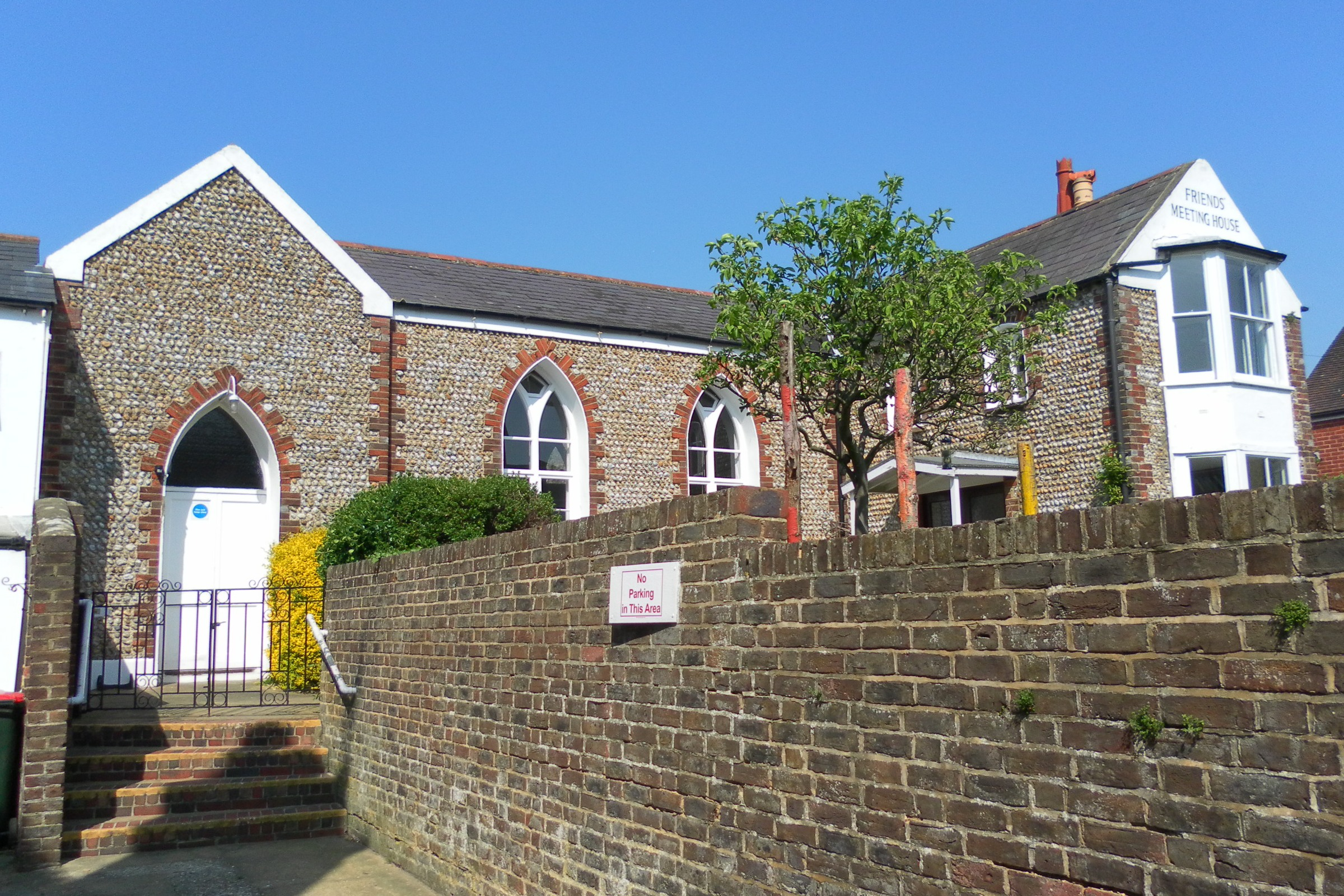
The entrance, in a slightly projecting bay, is set under a pointed arch.

The former school is L-shaped, with a long south wing and a projecting east wing. The façade has flint cobbles with red-brick dressings and grey-brick quoins. The main wing, of three bays, has two pointed-arched windows with inset pairs of lancet and a similar arched entrance on the left side in a projecting bay. The east wing has a full-height canted bay window facing south, set below a stuccoed gable with the painted legend friends' meeting house. This two-storey section was originally the schoolmaster's accommodation.

The English Heritage listing recognises the meeting house's group value with the adjacent buildings at 7, 9, 11, 13 and 15 Church Street. This is defined as "the extent to which the exterior contributes to the architectural or historic interest of any group of buildings of which [a listed building] forms part". Numbers 11, 13 and 15 are a terrace of cottages, two of which were built in the 18th century but were given new façades in the 1830s when the other was built. Numbers 7 and 9, now two cottages but originally a single farmhouse, date from 1700 and have a flint and red-brick façade.

== See also ==
- List of places of worship in Arun

== Notes ==
=== Bibliography ===
- Black, Adam; Black, Charles (2000) [1861]. Black's 1861 Guide to Sussex (Facsimile of original publication). Black's Guides: South-Eastern Counties of England. Bakewell: Country Books. ISBN 1-898941-21-1.
- Elleray, D. Robert (2004). Sussex Places of Worship. Worthing: Optimus Books. ISBN 0-9533132-7-1.
- Lewis, C.P., ed. (2009). A History of the County of Sussex: Volume 5 Part 2. Littlehampton and District (Arundel Rape, South-Eastern Part, comprising Poling Hundred). Victoria County History. Vol. 5 (ii). Woodbridge: Boydell Press. ISBN 978-1-904356-19-6.
- Stell, Christopher (2002). Nonconformist Chapels and Meeting-houses in Eastern England. Swindon: English Heritage. ISBN 1-873592-50-7.
