= Yapton Free Church =

- Yapton Evangelical Free Church
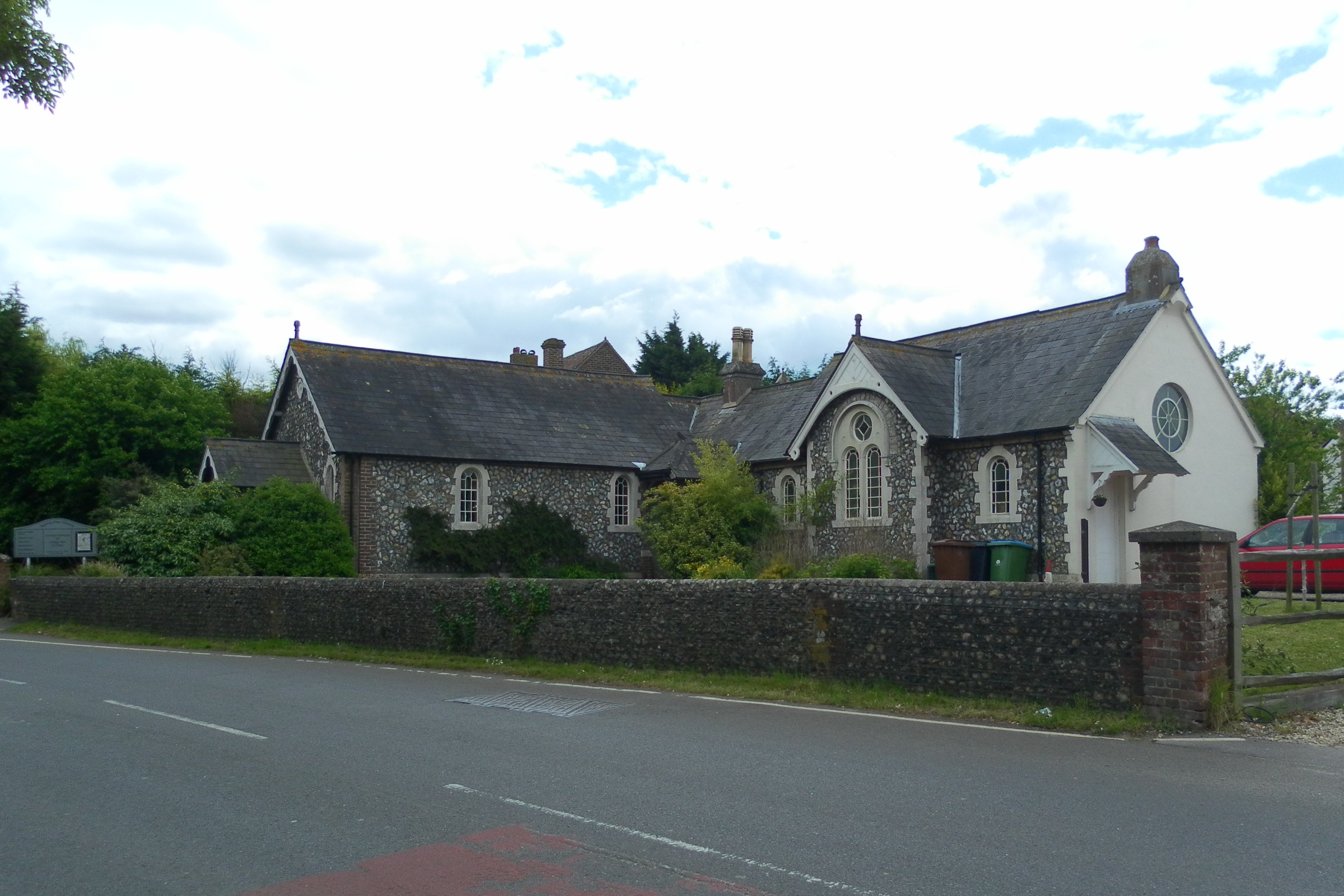
- The church (left) and attached schoolroom (right) from the northwest

- 50°49′15″N 0°36′56″W
- Location: Main Road, Yapton, West Sussex BN18 0EA
- Country: England
- Denomination: Evangelical
- Previous denomination: Congregational
- Website: yaptonfreechurch.net

History
- Status: Church
- Founded: 1861 (in present building)
- Founder: Henry Bateman

Architecture
- Functional status: Active
- Heritage designation: Grade II
- Designated: 20 September 1984
- Years built: 1861

Clergy
- Pastor: Hugo van Driel

Yapton Free Church (also known as Yapton Evangelical Free Church) is an Evangelical church in the village of Yapton in West Sussex, England. The "pretty flint building" dates from 1861, when it was built for a group of Congregational worshippers who had been active in the area for several years. Growth in membership during the 20th century meant that by the 1990s some services and activities were held in larger premises elsewhere, but the chapel remains registered as a place of worship. The church is denominationally independent but is associated with a worldwide cross-denomination network of churches called Partners in Harvest. The church building has been listed at Grade II by Historic England for its architectural and historical importance.

== History ==
Protestant Nonconfirmists were attested locally in the 17th century: the Compton Census of 1676 found six living in the parish. People associated with Independent polity and with Congregationalism were meeting for worship in the village possibly as early as 1830, and certainly by 1846 when a room was registered for their use. This was succeeded either by a new chapel in 1848 on the site of the present building, or a different meeting room elsewhere in 1850. In its early days, the cause was associated with Trinity Congregational Church in nearby Arundel, which carried out missionary work in the village in the 1840s. A Sunday school was formed by 1851. The present chapel, with a Sunday school building attached at right-angles, was built in 1861 and funded by Henry Bateman. The Congregational church at nearby Littlehampton supported the cause in its early years, and in 1865 it was recorded that the minister came from there. A resident minister, living in a house next to the chapel (demolished in the 1970s), was in place by 1886.

From 1973 the church adopted an Evangelical identity and became known as Yapton Evangelical Free Church. By 1991 services were taking place in Yapton and Ford Village Hall because congregations were too large for the chapel. The church is now associated with the Partners in Harvest network, founded in Canada in 1994, which works with independent churches of various denominations across the world.

The church is registered for worship in accordance with the Places of Worship Registration Act 1855; its number on the register is 14693. With the name Congregational Chapel it was registered for the solemnisation of marriages in accordance with the Marriage Act 1836 on 20 October 1887.

== Architecture and heritage ==
Yapton Free Church is an l-shaped building consisting of the chapel and an attached schoolroom. It is a "pretty" building with walls of flint, mostly galleted, with some brickwork and stucco-faced ashlar dressings. The chapel itself, whose original internal fittings had been removed by the 1980s, has a two-bay façade with a gable and porch. The side elevations have round-headed windows. There is a second entrance on the inner side of the l where the schoolroom joins. This has a single-storey three-bay façade; the projecting centre bay is also gabled and has a wider arched window; the other windows are narrow single-light openings.

== See also ==
- List of places of worship in Arun

== Bibliography ==
- Elleray, D. Robert (2004). Sussex Places of Worship. Worthing: Optimus Books. ISBN 0-9533132-7-1.
- Lewis, C.P., ed. (2009). A History of the County of Sussex: Volume 5 Part 2. Littlehampton and District (Arundel Rape, South-Eastern Part, comprising Poling Hundred). Victoria County History. Vol. 5 (ii). Woodbridge: Boydell Press. ISBN 978-1-904356-19-6.
- Stell, Christopher (2002). Nonconformist Chapels and Meeting-houses in Eastern England. Swindon: English Heritage. ISBN 1-873592-50-7.
- Williamson, Elizabeth; Hudson, Tim; Musson, Jeremy; Nairn, Ian (2019). Sussex: West. The Buildings of England. New Haven and London: Yale University Press. ISBN 978-0-300-22521-1.
