= South Bersted =

Village and parish in West Sussex, England

Coordinates: 50.79403°N 0.67517°W

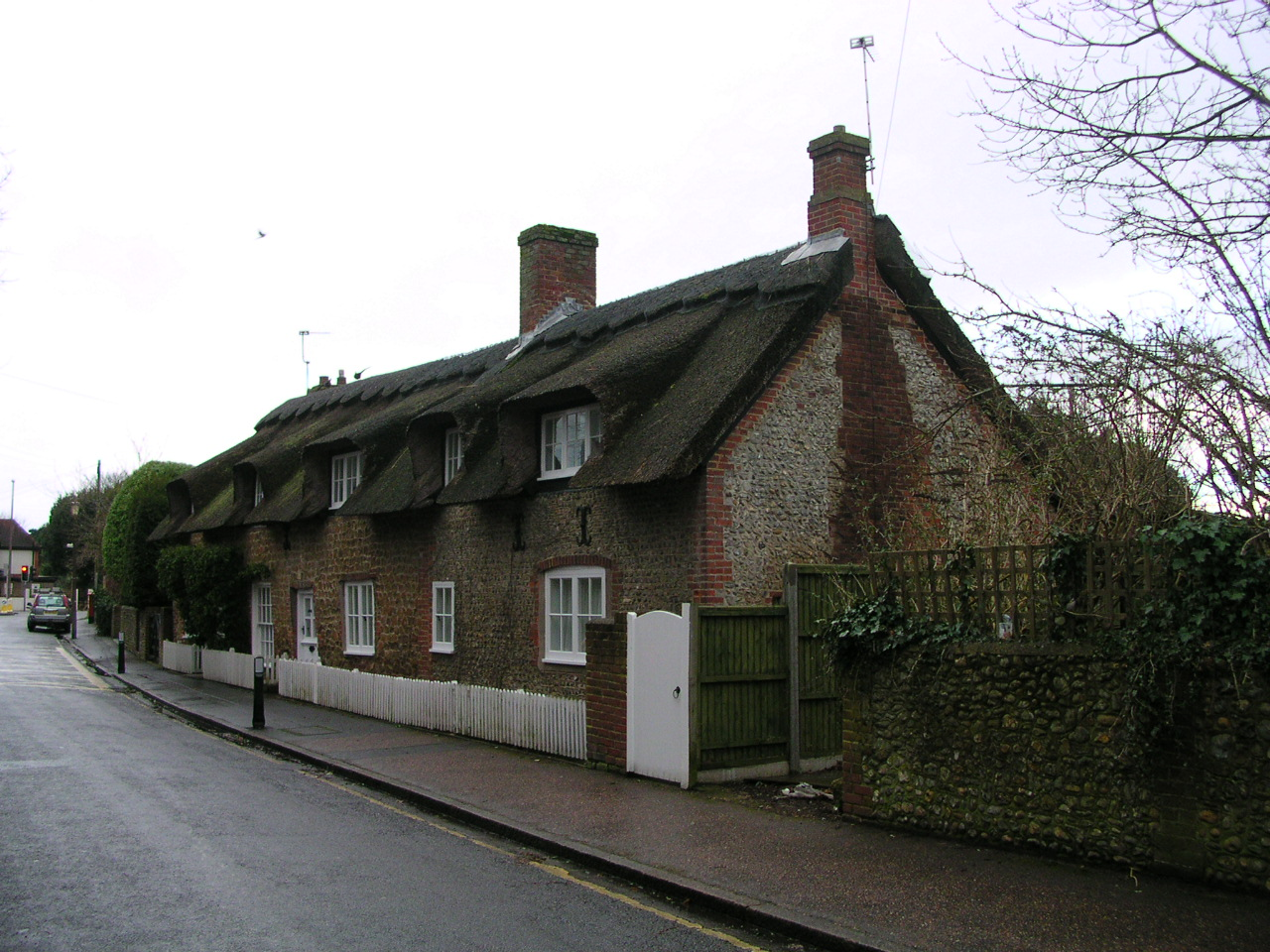

- Location within West Sussex
- OS grid reference: SU934002
- Civil parish: Bognor Regis
- District: Arun
- Shire county: West Sussex
- Region: South East
- Country: England
- Sovereign state: United Kingdom
- Post town: Bognor Regis
- Postcode district: PO22
- Police: Sussex
- Fire: West Sussex
- Ambulance: South East Coast
- UK Parliament: Bognor Regis and Littlehampton

South Bersted is a village and parish in the Arun district of West Sussex, England. It forms part of the built up area of Bognor Regis and lies on the A259 and A29 roads one mile (1.6 km) north of the town centre.

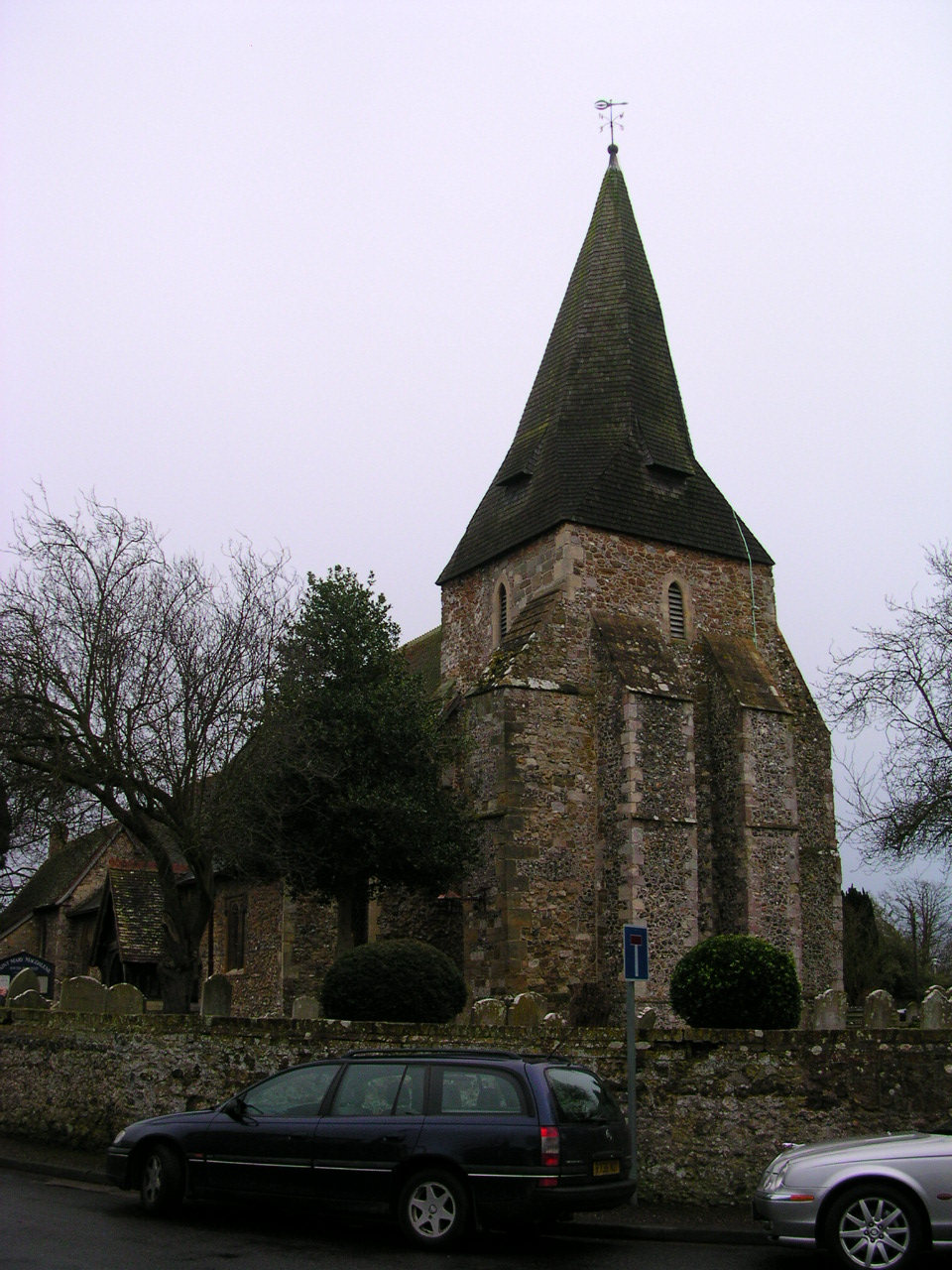
The Grade II* listed Church of St. Mary Magdalene

The Anglican parish church of Saint Mary Magdalene is mainly 13th century including the tower. Beginning as a chapel of Pagham it was a separate parish including Bognor by 1465.

South Bersted C of E primary school has gained bronze and silver awards as an Eco-school.
