= Bersted =

Civil parish in the Arun district of West Sussex, England

Coordinates: 50.797°N 0.689°W

- Location within West Sussex
- Area: 7.13 km^{2} (2.75 sq mi)
- Population: 8,496 (Civil Parish.2011)
  - Density: 1,192/km^{2} (3,090/sq mi)
- OS grid reference: SU9200
  - London: 55 miles (89 km) NNE
- Civil parish: Bersted
- District: Arun
- Shire county: West Sussex
- Region: South East
- Country: England
- Sovereign state: United Kingdom
- Post town: BOGNOR REGIS
- Postcode district: PO21
- Dialling code: 01243
- Police: Sussex
- Fire: West Sussex
- Ambulance: South East Coast
- UK Parliament: Chichester

Bersted is a civil parish in the Arun district of West Sussex, England. It is made up of two independent villages, North Bersted and Shripney.

== Governance ==
An electoral ward in the same name exists. This ward contains a little of Bognor Regis but still has a total population taken at the 2011 census of 8,496.

== Geography ==
Elevations range from 8m in the south-west to 2-3m above ordnance datum in the south-east where a straightened river drains the parish.

An industrial and business estate takes up the easternmost part of Bersted - in common with most of the country business tends to refer to their post town Bognor Regis and includes a superstore. Some of this area is in the town's boundaries.

== History ==
At North Bersted were found Celtic and Roman settlement remains, including the grave of a warrior known as the North Bersted Man. The ancient village of South Bersted is now part of Bognor Regis civil parish; it has the 13th century church of the Bersted ecclesiastical parish, which is mid-ranked in the national system.

== Localities ==
=== North Bersted ===
This is part of the built-up area next to Bognor Regis accessed on the A259 road commencing 1 mile (1.6 km) northwest of the town's seafront centre.

=== Shripney ===
Shripney, in the northeast, has evolved from a thirteenth-century hamlet. It lies on the A29 road 2 miles (3.2 km) north of Bognor Regis. The Robin Hood pub is on Shripney Road. In Shripney Lane, there are over forty dwellings, including thatched cottages and caravans.
