= Warningcamp =

Village and parish in West Sussex, England

Coordinates: 50.85489°N 0.53365°W

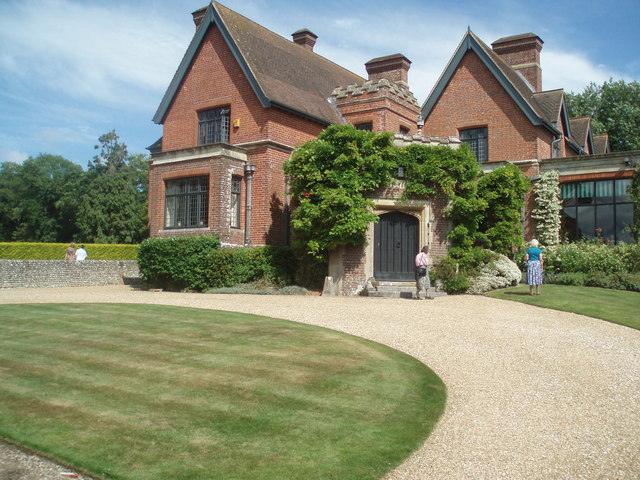

- Location within West Sussex
- Area: 3.76 km^{2} (1.45 sq mi)
- Population: 156 (Civil Parish.2011)
  - Density: 41/km^{2} (110/sq mi)
- OS grid reference: TQ033071
  - London: 48 miles (77 km) NNE
- Civil parish: Warningcamp
- District: Arun
- Shire county: West Sussex
- Region: South East
- Country: England
- Sovereign state: United Kingdom
- Post town: ARUNDEL
- Postcode district: BN18
- Dialling code: 01903
- Police: Sussex
- Fire: West Sussex
- Ambulance: South East Coast
- UK Parliament: Arundel and South Downs

Warningcamp is a village and civil parish in the Arun District of West Sussex, England. It is 1 mile (1.6 km) east of Arundel, on the east bank of the River Arun. The south-east quarter of the parish is woodland.

== History ==
A medieval chapelry community of the parish of Lyminster, it contained 119 inhabitants in 1848. The tithes continued to belong until close to that date to Eton College however were commuted for £191 10s (equivalent to £18,723 in 2025) saving a small glebe of 4 acres (1.6 ha) for the College to help to support the position of the priest.

== Contemporary description ==
Local historian Mary Barber wrote in 2002 that:

"Warningcamp has even been called a 'township'. The former Arundel Youth Hostel, actually in Warningcamp, brought in some 7,000 visitors a year.

Most residents now work elsewhere or are retired. There are now five main areas of buildings; for convenience described Lower, Middle and Upper Warningcamp, Blakehurst and the Dover. The oldest surviving buildings are timber-framed from the 16th century. There was a village school from the 19th century until it closed in 1926. Warningcamp [as part of Leominster, had a] chapel dated from the 12th century, until the late 18th century [when it disappeared]. In the 19th century, the village school building was used as a chapel which finally was closed in the 1960s.

People often miss Warningcamp, on the east bank of the River Arun opposite Arundel, on their way to Burpham [an isolated hillside village with many more listed buildings]. It is a very linear development stretched out mainly along the east-west road from the River Arun. It has altered its boundaries over the centuries to include Calceto Priory and Clay Lane; hence they are included where relevant. At this present time, they come under Lyminster Parish, with the southern boundary of Warningcamp stretching through the woods to the Dover. An ancient boundry [sic] bank can still be seen near the ditch. The highest point near the north-east boundary is at 58m [sic]. The underlaying geology of alluvial flood plain, chalk, head, Reading beds, and clay with flints... [sic]

Warningcamp lists its facilities as one telephone box, two post boxes and a bus shelter, making it one of the poorest served communities in West Sussex, and officially a hamlet (no church, no school, pub or shop)."

The Monarch's Way long-distance footpath passes through the village close to the former youth hostel. The parish has many footpaths and rises from 2m above mean high tide at the River Arun to 68m above Ordnance Datum along some of its north edge.
