= Yapton =

Village and parish in West Sussex, England

Coordinates: 50.81999°N 0.61121°W

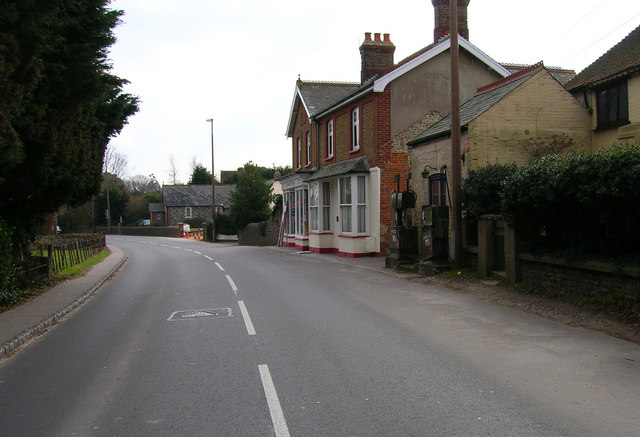

- Location within West Sussex
- Area: 7.9 km^{2} (3.1 sq mi)
- Population: 3,571 (Civil Parish.2011)
  - Density: 452/km^{2} (1,170/sq mi)
- OS grid reference: SU979031
  - London: 52 miles (84 km) NNE
- Civil parish: Yapton
- District: Arun
- Shire county: West Sussex
- Region: South East
- Country: England
- Sovereign state: United Kingdom
- Post town: ARUNDEL
- Postcode district: BN18
- Dialling code: 01243
- Police: Sussex
- Fire: West Sussex
- Ambulance: South East Coast
- UK Parliament: Bognor Regis and Littlehampton
- Website: http://www.yaptonpc.gov.uk/

Yapton is a village and civil parish in the Arun District of West Sussex, England, three miles (4.8 km) north east of Bognor Regis at the intersection of the B2132 and B2233 roads.

Yapton lies on the coastal plain south west of Arundel, between the South Downs and the sea. St Mary the Virgin parish church, 13th century or earlier in origin, is in the centre of the village. It houses a twelfth-century font. Nearby, Yapton Free Church was built in 1861 as a Congregational chapel but is now Evangelical in character. Yapton C of E Primary School was founded in 1864.

Other settlements in the parish include Bilsham and Flansham. The settlement of Bilsham was listed in the Domesday Book of 1086 as having 14 households. Bilsham Chapel is a deconsecrated former chapel of ease to St Mary the Virgin Church; it dates from the 13th–14th century but fell out of use in the mid-16th century. The building is now a house.

== History ==
The disused Portsmouth and Arundel Canal which linked nearby the River Arun to Chichester Harbour, runs through the village. This was built primarily on the financial case it would be a safe inland shipping route between London and Portsmouth avoiding the then risk of attack in the English Channel by the French. Throughout its lifetime, 1823-1855 - a time when the Wey and Arun Canal was open (having opened 7 years earlier and having closed in 1871) - the route was used for transporting agricultural goods and munitions, for instance, from Chilworth and Hanworth gunpowder works and to/from the military docks on the lower Thames in the Royal Borough of Greenwich.

== Governance ==
An electoral ward in the same name exists. This ward stretches South East to Climping with a total population of 5,926 at the 2011 Census.

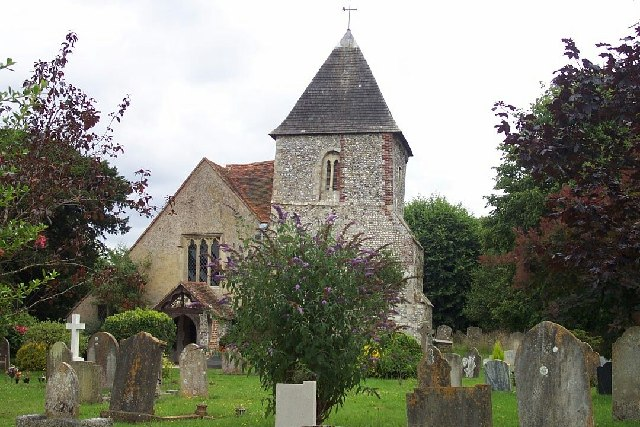
St Mary's Church

== Notable residents ==
Duncan Goodhew, the Olympic swimming maestro was brought up in Yapton. There is a residential road, Goodhew Close, named after him. Sculptor Ginger Gilmour works from a 15th-century farmhouse near Yapton, where she has created several studios. The Scottish poet Andrew Young lived in Yapton after he retired in 1959. Michael Fellows MBE DSC BEM* MSM. Royal Navy clearance diver. Also has a road in the village bearing his name. Falklands Island veteran and awarded the Distinguished Service Cross for saving 450 lives and the ship HMS Antrim Argentine-dropped 1,000 lb bomb penetrated the stern of HMS Antrim, ricocheted off missile magazines and internal structures, and came to rest in the after compartments with its tail unit torn off.

The Operation: Fleet Clearance Diving team members Fleet Chief Petty Officer (Clearance Diver) Mick Fellows, Leading Diver Garry Sewell, and Diver Nigel Pullen boarded the ship under sporadic enemy aircraft fire.

The Action: Working for nearly 10 hours in a fume-filled compartment while the ship maneuvered at high speeds to evade attacks, the team safely hoisted the live bomb out through a hole cut in the flight deck and jettisoned it into the sea.

The Result: The successful operation saved the major warship and the lives of 450 crew members.
