= Houghton, West Sussex =

Village and parish in West Sussex, England

Coordinates: 50.89441°N 0.55318°W

Houghton
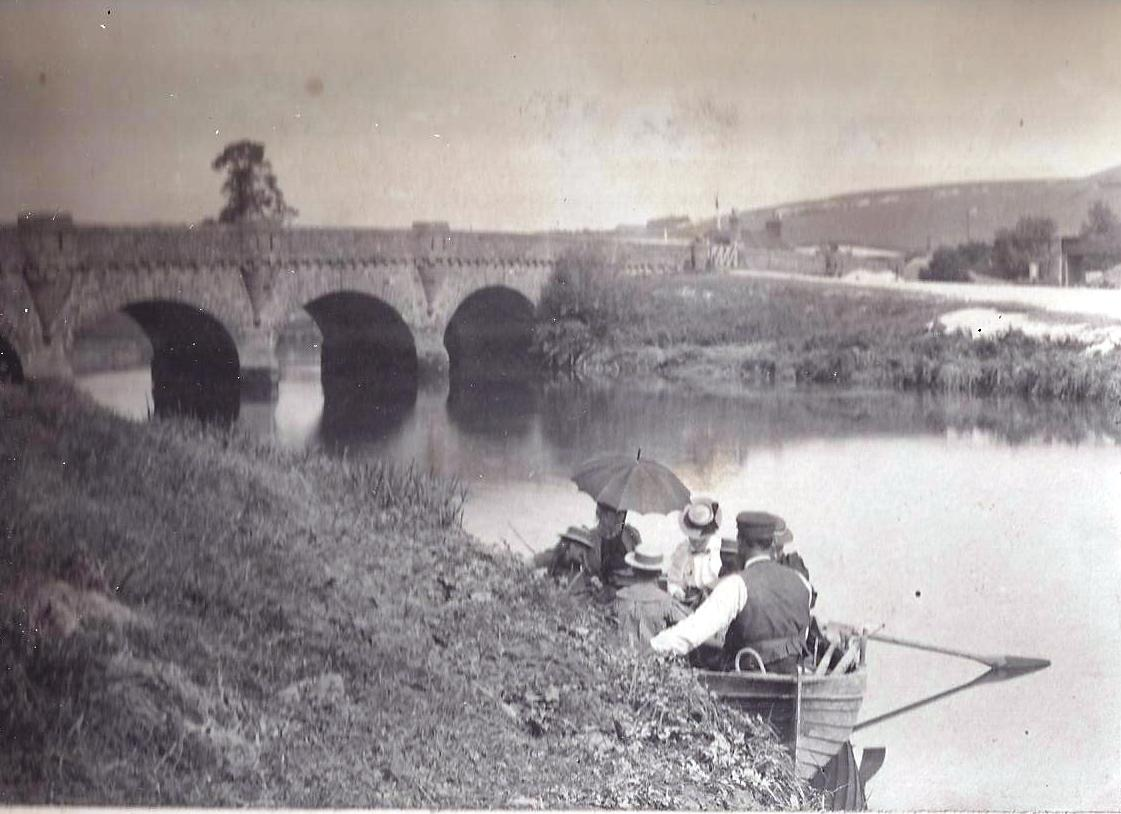
- Bridge over the Arun at Houghton

- Location within West Sussex
- Area: 12.59 km^{2} (4.86 sq mi)
- Population: 153 (Civil Parish.2011)
  - Density: 12/km^{2} (31/sq mi)
- OS grid reference: TQ018115
  - London: 46 miles (74 km) NNE
- Civil parish: Houghton
- District: Arun
- Shire county: West Sussex
- Region: South East
- Country: England
- Sovereign state: United Kingdom
- Post town: ARUNDEL
- Postcode district: BN18
- Dialling code: 01798
- Police: Sussex
- Fire: West Sussex
- Ambulance: South East Coast
- UK Parliament: Arundel and South Downs

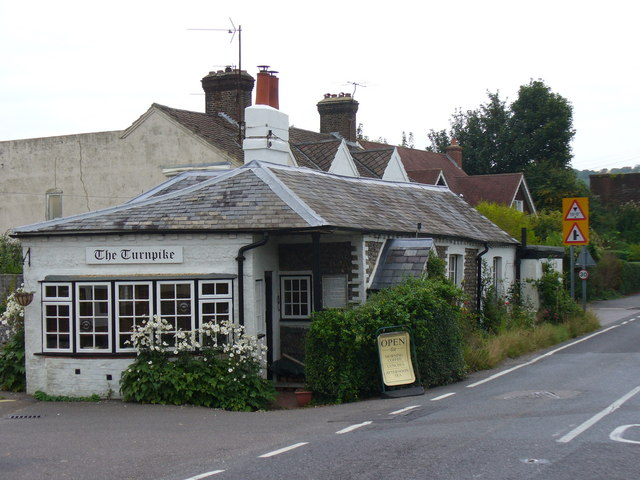
The Turnpike

Houghton (/ˈhaʊtən/) is a low-population, linear settlement with a large elevated tract of land which is mostly wooded and two main farms forming its civil parish in the Arun District of West Sussex, England. It is on the River Arun, where it has a bridge to a rural part of Amberley, 3 miles (5 km) north of Arundel. The area is, equally, part of the South Downs National Park. The census 2011 included the population of South Stoke.

== Geography ==
The Downs rise steeply from the riverside plain to the west and north-west of the developed street. A straight side-road leads just 1 mile (1.6 km) to the nearest village with a convenience shop, Bury, still on the relatively flat eastern plain, at the foot of the hills. Homes are modest but many are listed buildings.

== Amenities and recreation ==
In the village is a simple two-cell church dedicated to St Nicholas, originally built in the 13th century but largely rebuilt in 1857. It is mid ranked in the national grading system of listed buildings (at Grade II*).

Houghton is home to the George and Dragon pub, pre-dating the English Civil War. A large minority of Arundel Park where it is well-wooded is in the parish, as is Houghton Forest which is free public access and covers the west of the parish.

The Monarch's Way long-distance footpath (which follows Charles's supposed route from Worcester to Shoreham-by-Sea) descends from the Downs to the west into the village, before heading south along the river towards Arundel.
