= Patching =

Village and parish in West Sussex, England

Coordinates: 50.84687°N 0.45663°W

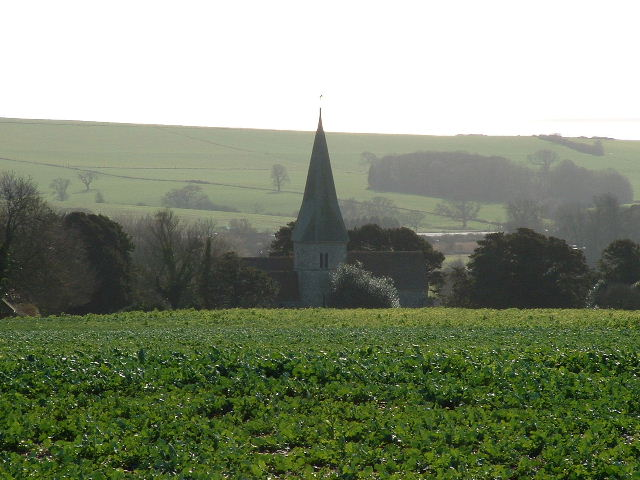

- Location within West Sussex
- Area: 8.46 km^{2} (3.27 sq mi)
- Population: 259 (Civil Parish.2011)
  - Density: 31/km^{2} (80/sq mi)
- OS grid reference: TQ087063
  - London: 48 miles (77 km) NNE
- Civil parish: Patching
- District: Arun
- Shire county: West Sussex
- Region: South East
- Country: England
- Sovereign state: United Kingdom
- Post town: WORTHING
- Postcode district: BN13
- Dialling code: 01903
- Police: Sussex
- Fire: West Sussex
- Ambulance: South East Coast
- UK Parliament: Worthing West

Patching is a small village and civil parish that lies amid the fields and woods of the southern slopes of the South Downs in the National Park in the Arun District of West Sussex, England. It has a visible hill-workings history going back to before the Domesday Book survey of 1086–7. It is centred four miles (6.4 km) to the east of Arundel and a quarter of a mile from Clapham, to the north of the A27 road. The civil parish covers an area of 846.12 hectares (2,090.8 acres).

In the centre of the village is the 13th-century Church of St John the Divine, restored in 1888. Above the village on the South Downs are groups of Neolithic flint mines, represented by slight hollows and mounds.

Michelgrove Park, once the site of a great house where Sir William Shelley entertained Henry VIII and later home of the Shelley Baronets, is in the north of the parish. It is crossed by the Monarch's Way long-distance footpath, marking the supposed route of Charles II's escape to France in 1651.
