= Aldwick =

Village and parish in West Sussex, England

Coordinates: 50.7825°N 0.7069°W

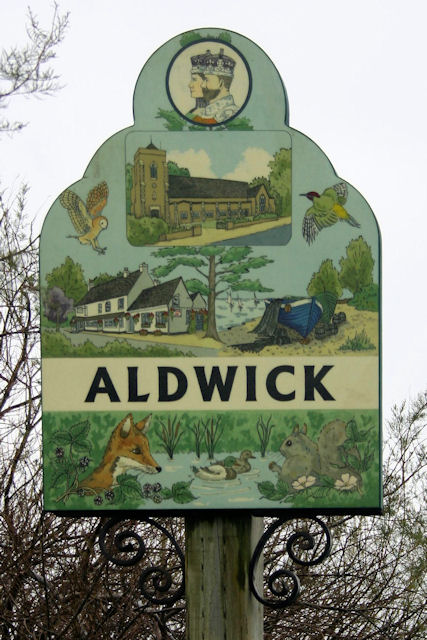
- Village sign

- Location within West Sussex
- Area: 3.83 km^{2} (1.48 sq mi)
- Population: 11,282 (Civil Parish.2011)
  - Density: 2,946/km^{2} (7,630/sq mi)
- OS grid reference: SZ912988
  - London: 56 miles (90 km) NNE
- Civil parish: Aldwick
- District: Arun
- Shire county: West Sussex
- Region: South East
- Country: England
- Sovereign state: United Kingdom
- Post town: BOGNOR REGIS
- Postcode district: PO21
- Dialling code: 01243
- Police: Sussex
- Fire: West Sussex
- Ambulance: South East Coast
- UK Parliament: Bognor Regis and Littlehampton

Aldwick is a seaside village and civil parish in the Arun district of West Sussex, England. Bognor Regis is to the east of the village. The ecclesiastical parish, formerly part of Pagham includes the smaller settlement of Rose Green.

There are three churches, a few shops and several miles of beach.

== History ==
Aldwick was formerly part of the older Pagham parish and formerly an important tithing, giving its name to a hundred. It was part of the ancient Rape of Chichester.

=== 20th century ===
Aldwick had, briefly, a home of the constitutional monarch of the British Empire when King George V convalesced (with his wider family regularly visiting) at Craigweil House in 1929, before its demolition. This stay led directly to Bognor attaining the suffix 'Regis'. The area around this has throwback relatively ornate architecture of the early 20th century and a large conservation area.

== Amenities ==
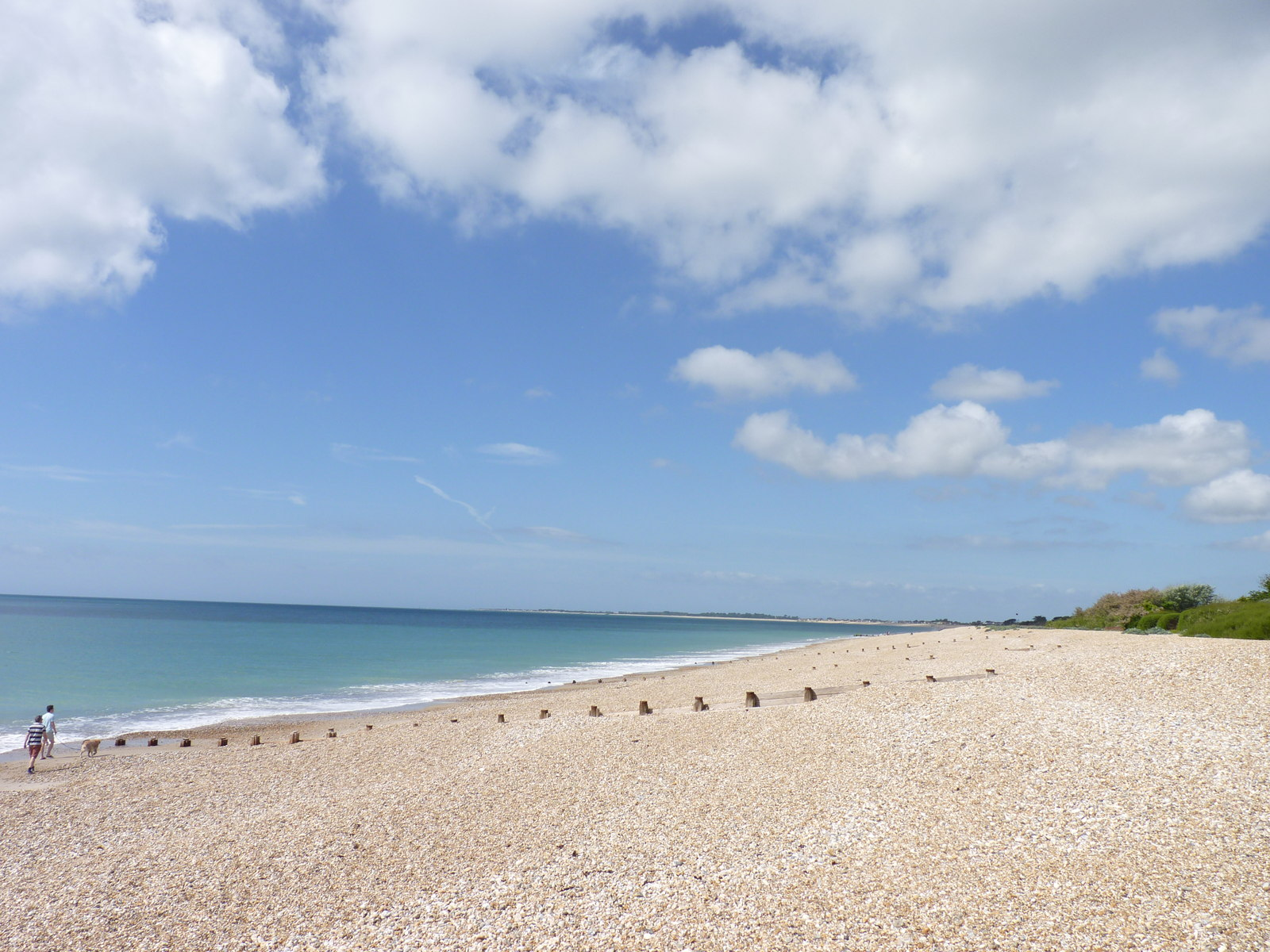
Aldwick beach

- Avisford Park in Rose Green has a large field that has a play area, basketball court and seating area as well as a sports pavilion for football matches. In 1988 there were plans to build a large Co-op on this field, but due to strong opposition the plan was dropped. Four houses were built on a minority of the formerly larger site.
- The former Ship public house on Aldwick Street closed in 2014 and was subsequently converted to a convenience store.

== Churches ==
Aldwick has three churches: Anglican, dedicated to St Richard of Chichester, built in 1933 (a former iron church existed); Roman Catholic dedicated to St Anthony of Viareggio; Free Church (Baptist).

== Landmarks ==
A blue cedar Cedrus atlantica (glauca) was planted by Queen Mary in 1929.

== Notable residents ==
- Duff Cooper (1890–1954) became Viscount Norwich of Aldwick in 1952
- The Marchioness of Cambridge had "Three Ways" built at Canons Close, for her occasional use.
- Albert Grant (1831–99) lived at Aldwick Place and died there in August 1899.
- Raine Spencer (1929–2016), socialite and stepmother to Diana, Princess of Wales and daughter of Barbara Cartland, lived in Aldwick.
