= Arun District =

Local government district in West Sussex, England

Coordinates: 50°48′29.7″N 0°32′18.6″W

- Non-metropolitan district
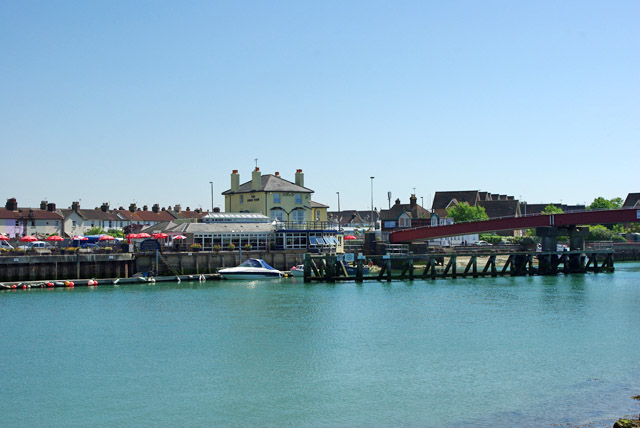
- River Arun at Littlehampton

- Arun shown within West Sussex
- Sovereign state: United Kingdom
- Country: England
- Region: South East England
- Historic county: Sussex
- County: West Sussex
- Incorporated: 1 April 1974
- Administrative HQ: Littlehampton

Government
  - Type: Non-metropolitan district council
  - Body: Arun District Council
  - MPs: Beccy Cooper (Lab); Andrew Griffith (C); Alison Griffiths (C)

Area
  - Total: 85.3 sq mi (221.0 km^{2})
  - Rank: 138th (of 296)

Population (2025)
  - Total: 172,326
  - Rank: 123rd (of 296)
  - Density: 2,020/sq mi (779.8/km^{2})

Ethnicity (2021)
  - Ethnic groups: List: 95.8% White; 1.6% Asian; 1.5% Mixed; 0.6% other; 0.5% Black

Religion (2021)
  - Religion: List: 52.1% Christianity; 39.9% no religion; 6% not stated; 0.7% Islam; 0.5% other; 0.3% Buddhism; 0.2% Hinduism; 0.2% Judaism; 0.1% Sikhism
- Time zone: UTC0 (GMT)
  - Summer (DST): UTC+1 (BST)
- ONS code: 45UC (ONS); E07000224 (GSS)
- OS grid reference: TQ029020

Arun is a local government district in West Sussex, England. Its council is based in Littlehampton. The district's other towns are Arundel and Bognor Regis. The district is named after the River Arun, which runs through the centre of the district. Parts of the district fall within the South Downs National Park.

The district is on the coast, facing the English Channel. The neighbouring districts are Chichester, Horsham, Adur and Worthing.

== History ==
Arun district was formed on 1 April 1974 under the Local Government Act 1972 as one of seven districts within West Sussex. The new district covered the whole area of three former districts and parts of another two, all of which were abolished at the same time:

- Arundel Municipal Borough
- Bognor Regis Urban District
- Chichester Rural District (part, being the parishes of Aldingbourne, Barnham, Bersted, Climping, Eastergate, Ford, Madehurst, Middleton-on-Sea, Pagham, Slindon, Tortington, Walberton, and Yapton - rest went to Chichester District.)
- Littlehampton Urban District
- Worthing Rural District (except parishes of Coombes, Lancing, and Sompting, which went to Adur District)

The new district was named Arun, after the River Arun which flows through the centre of the district, passing through the town of Arundel and meeting the sea at Littlehampton.

== Geography ==
Arun District occupies the central southern area of West Sussex, and is bordered by Chichester District to the west, Horsham District to the north and Worthing borough and Adur District to the east. The district is bisected by the River Arun, and is divided between a broad rural area in the north of the district that contains Arundel and a host of small villages, part of which sits within the South Downs National Park, and an urban coastal strip that includes Bognor Regis and Littlehampton.

== Governance ==
Arun District Council

Type
- Type: Non-metropolitan district council

Leadership
- Chair: Jill Long, Liberal Democrat since 20 May 2026
- Leader: Martin Lury, Liberal Democrat since 15 May 2024
- Chief Executive: Dawn Hudd since 2024

Structure
- Seats: 54 councillors
- Graph of the party split among 54 seats.
- Political groups: Administration (22) Liberal Democrats (14) Green (5) Independent (3) Other parties (32) Conservative (19) Labour (8) Independent (3) Reform UK (2)

Elections
- Last election: 4 May 2023
- Next election: 6 May 2027

Meeting place
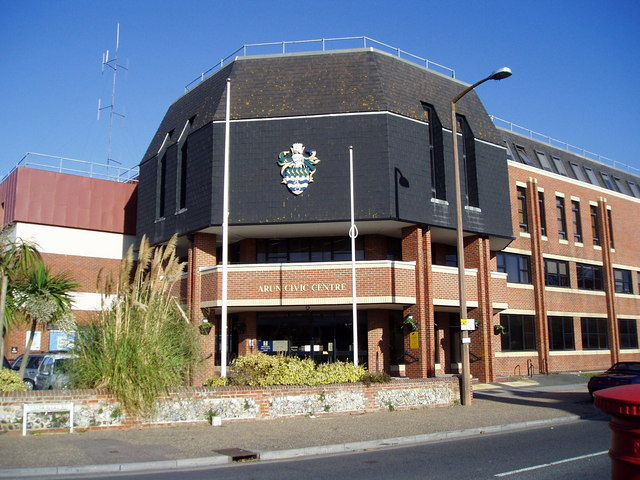
- Civic Centre, 1 Maltravers Road, Littlehampton, BN17 5LF

Website
- www.arun.gov.uk

Arun District Council provides district-level services. County-level services are provided by West Sussex County Council. The district is also entirely divided into civil parishes, which form a third tier of local government.

=== Political control ===
The council has been under no overall control since 2019. Following the 2023 election the Conservatives were the largest party, but a coalition of the Liberal Democrats, Labour, Greens and some of the independents took control of the council, appointing a Liberal Democrat leader and Labour deputy leader of the council, to replace the previous Conservative minority administration. Labour withdrew from the ruling coalition in November 2026.

The first election to the council was held in 1973, initially operating as a shadow authority alongside the outgoing authorities until the new arrangements came into effect on 1 April 1974. Political control of the council since 1974 has been as follows:

Party in control	Years
Conservative	1974–2019
No overall control	2019–present

=== Leadership ===
The leaders of the council since 2002 have been:

Councillor	Party	From	To
Norman Dingemans	Conservative	2002	2006
Gillian Brown	Conservative	2006	May 2019
James Walsh	Liberal Democrats	22 May 2019	19 May 2021
Shaun Gunner	Conservative	19 May 2021	May 2023
Matt Stanley	Liberal Democrats	31 May 2023	15 May 2024
Martin Lury	Liberal Democrats	15 May 2024	

=== Composition ===
Following the 2023 election, and subsequent by-elections and changes of allegiance up to May 2025, the composition of the council was:

Party	Councillors
Conservative	19
Liberal Democrats	14
Labour	8
Independent	6
Green	5
Reform	2
Total	54

Three of the independent councillors sit together as the "Independent Group", which forms part of the council's administration with the Liberal Democrats and Greens. Another two independent councillors form the "Arun Independent Group", and the other is not part of a group. The next election is due in 2027.

=== Premises ===
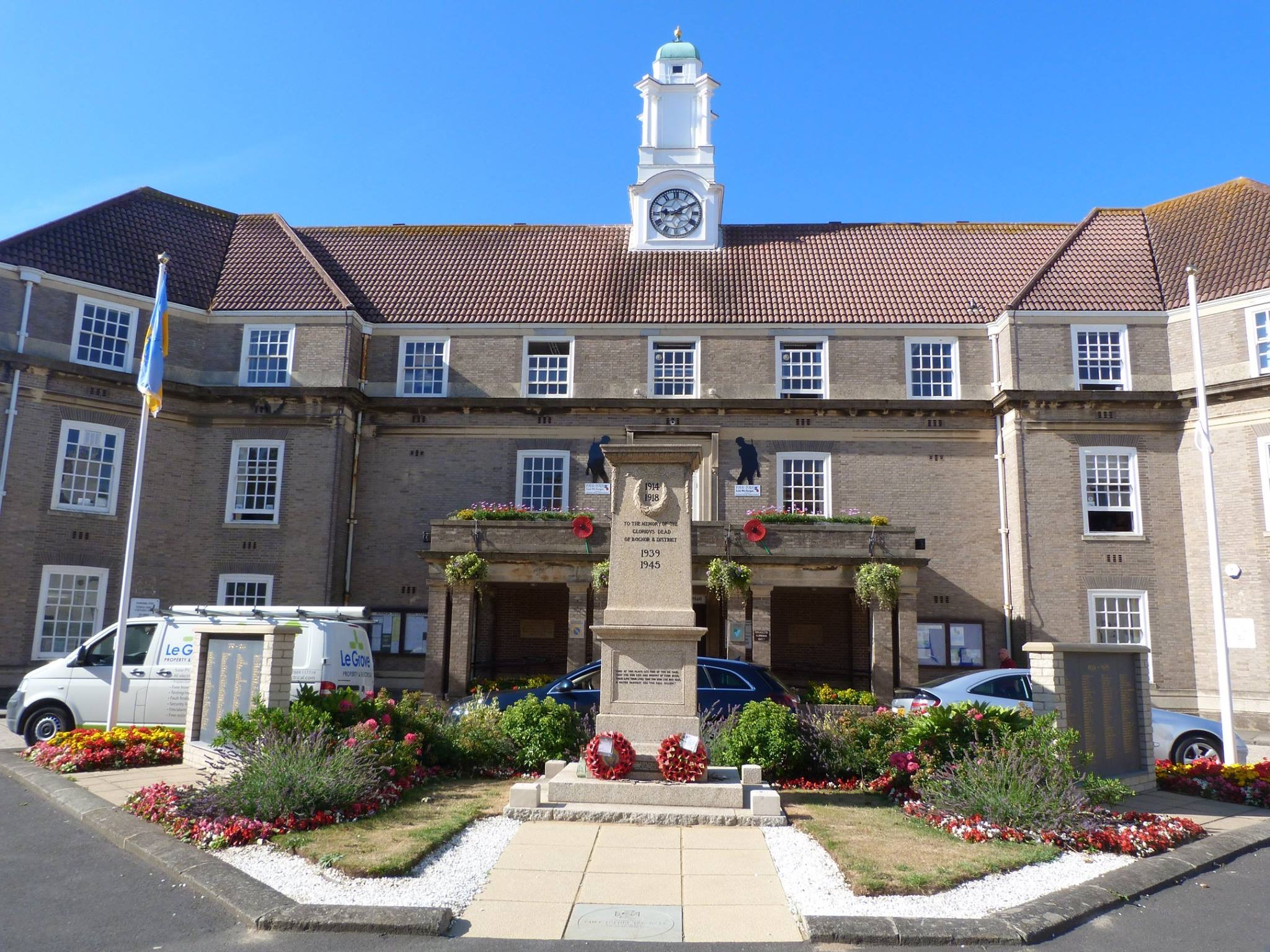
Bognor Regis Town Hall, Arun's area office in Bognor Regis

The council has its headquarters at the Civic Centre on Maltravers Road in Littlehampton, which was purpose-built for the council in 1986. It also maintains an area office at the Town Hall on Clarence Road in Bognor Regis.

== Elections ==
Since the last boundary changes in 2015 the council has comprised 54 councillors elected from 23 wards, with each ward electing either two or three councillors. Elections are held every four years.

=== Wards ===
The wards are:

- Aldwick East
- Aldwick West
- Angmering & Findon
- Arundel & Walberton
- Barnham
- Beach
- Bersted
- Brookfield
- Courtwick with Toddington
- East Preston
- Felpham East
- Felpham West
- Ferring
- Hotham
- Marine
- Middleton-on-Sea
- Orchard
- Pagham
- Pevensey
- River
- Rustington East
- Rustington West
- Yapton

== Civil parishes ==
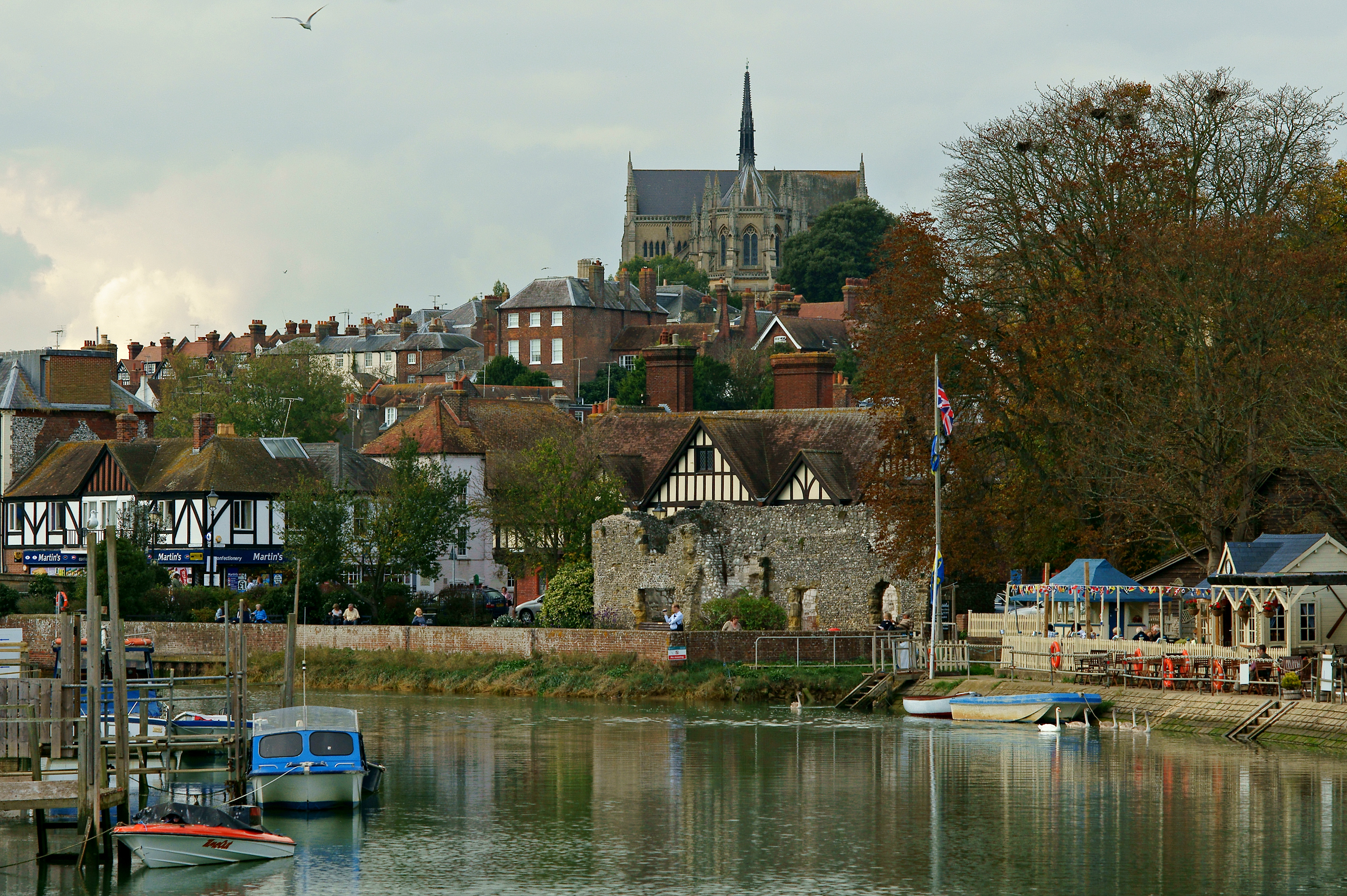
Arundel, the district's third town.

The whole district is covered by civil parishes. The parish councils for Arundel, Bognor Regis and Littlehampton have declared their parishes to be towns, allowing them to take the style "town council". The following 31 civil parishes are located within the district:

Parish	Type	Area (Hectare)	Population (2001)	Pop Density /Hectare
Aldingbourne	Parish Council	1253	3612	2.88
Aldwick	Parish Council	425	10884	25.61
Angmering	Parish Council	1782	5639	3.16
Arundel	Town Council	1227	3408	2.78
Barnham	Parish Council	373	1372	3.68
Bersted	Parish Council	713	8443	11.85
Bognor Regis	Town Council	486	22555	46.44
Burpham	Parish Meeting	1245	193	0.15
Clapham	Parish Council	515	317	0.62
Climping	Parish Council	691	600	0.87
East Preston	Parish Council	241	5919	24.53
Eastergate	Parish Council	371	3107	8.39
Felpham	Parish Council	426	9611	24.53
Ferring	Parish Council	431	4361	10.13
Findon	Parish Council	1614	1848	1.14
Ford	Parish Council	415	1358	3.27
Houghton	Parish Meeting	743	76	0.10
Kingston	Parish Council	229	702	3.07
Littlehampton	Town Council	1135	25593	22.55
Lyminster	Parish Council	587	351	0.60
Madehurst	Parish Meeting	766	105	0.14
Middleton-on-Sea	Parish Council	412	5105	12.41
Pagham	Parish Council	1059	5729	5.41
Patching	Parish Council	846	230	0.27
Poling	Parish Meeting	320	173	0.54
Rustington	Parish Council	432	13210	30.60
Slindon	Parish Council	1286	590	0.46
South Stoke	Parish Meeting	535	44	0.08
Walberton	Parish Council	1044	1941	1.86
Warningcamp	Parish Meeting	378	161	0.43
Yapton	Parish Council	791	3522	4.46
Arun	Total	22770	140759	6.18

== Economy ==
Although set within the typically prosperous county of West Sussex, much of Bognor Regis and Littlehampton are ranked amongst the 20% most deprived areas in the UK as a whole on the Index of Multiple Deprivation. The district contains a large tourism sector, attracting visitors to the South Downs in the north, and the beaches of Bognor Regis and Littlehampton in the south, the latter of which holds a prestigious Blue Flag Award. Consequently, the district suffers from high amounts of seasonal employment, with the Office for National Statistics estimating that nearly 11% of the population of Arun is employed in the tourism sector, compared to 8% nationally, whilst 28% of people work in the distribution, hotels and restaurants sector, compared to just 23% nationally. Arun also has a higher number of public sector workers than either the regional or national average, and a significantly smaller finance and IT sector than the rest of the South East and wider UK.

== Awards ==
In 2008, the district council won an Ashden Award for their work on energy efficiency.

The District Council is regularly awarded the prestigious Green Flag Award which is given for excellent parks. Currently five parks in the District are recognised as meeting the requirements of Green Flag; Mewsbrook Park, Hotham Park, Norfolk Gardens, Old Rectory Gardens and Marine Park Gardens.

== Football clubs ==
- Arundel F.C.
- Bognor Regis Town F.C.
- Clymping F.C.
- East Preston F.C.
- Littlehampton Town F.C.
- Pagham F.C.
- Rustington F.C.
- Wick F.C.

== See also ==
- List of places of worship in Arun
