= Tudor Revival architecture =

British domestic building style

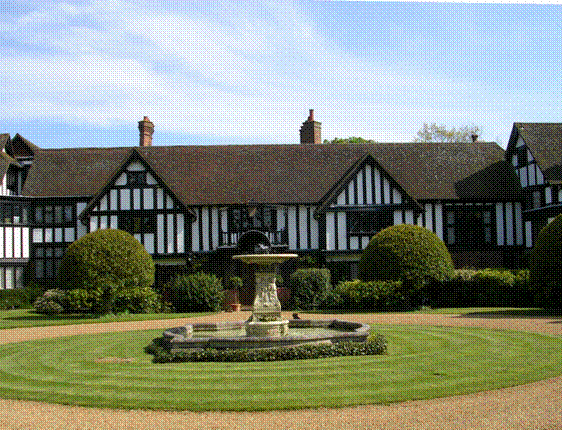
Ascott House in Buckinghamshire designed c. 1876 by George Devey, is an early example of Tudorbethan influence; a large English country house masquerading as a cottage.

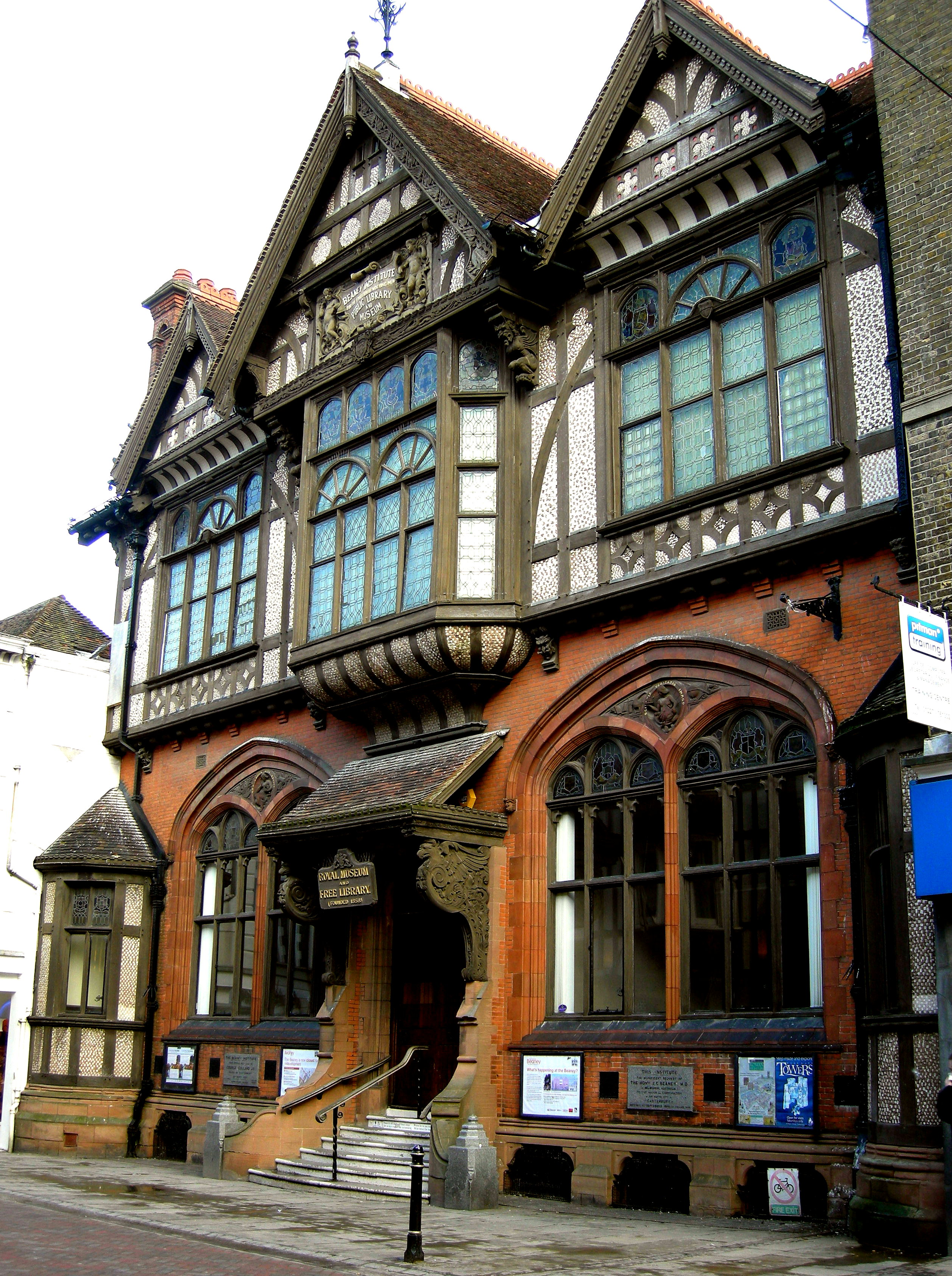
Half-timbering, Gothic Revival tracery and Jacobean carved porch brackets combine in the Tudor Revival Beaney Institute, Canterbury, built in 1899

Tudor Revival architecture, also known as mock Tudor in the UK, first manifested in domestic architecture in the United Kingdom in the latter half of the 19th century. Based on revival of aspects that were perceived as Tudor architecture, in reality it usually took the style of English vernacular architecture of the Middle Ages that had survived into the Tudor period.

The style later became an influence elsewhere, especially the British colonies. For example, in New Zealand, the architect Francis Petre adapted the style for the local climate. In Singapore, then a British colony, architects such as Regent Alfred John Bidwell pioneered what became known as the Black and White House. The earliest examples of the style originate with the works of such eminent architects as Norman Shaw and George Devey, in what at the time was considered Neo-Tudor design.

Tudorbethan is a subset of Tudor Revival architecture that eliminated some of the more complex aspects of Jacobethan in favour of more domestic styles of "Merrie England", which were cosier and quaint. It was associated with the Arts and Crafts movement.

== Identification ==
Today, the term 'Tudor architecture' usually refers to buildings constructed during the reigns of the first four Tudor monarchs, between about 1485 and 1560, perhaps best exemplified by the oldest parts of Hampton Court Palace. The historian Malcolm Airs, in his study The Tudor and Jacobean Country House: A Building History, considers the replacement of the private castle by the country house as "the seat of power and the centre of hospitality" to be "one of the great achievements of the Tudor age". Subsequent changes in court fashion saw the emergence of Elizabethan architecture among the elite, who built what are now called prodigy houses in a distinctive version of Renaissance architecture. Elizabeth I herself built almost nothing, her father having left over 50 palaces and houses. Outside court circles styles were much more slow-moving, and essentially "Tudor" buildings continued to be built, eventually merging into a general English vernacular style.

When the style was revived, the emphasis was typically on the simple, rustic, and the less impressive aspects of Tudor architecture, imitating in this way medieval houses and rural cottages. Although the style follows these more modest characteristics, items such as steeply pitched-roofs, half-timbering often infilled with herringbone brickwork, tall mullioned windows, high chimneys, jettied (overhanging) first floors above pillared porches, dormer windows supported by consoles, and even at times thatched roofs, gave Tudor Revival its more striking effects.

== History ==
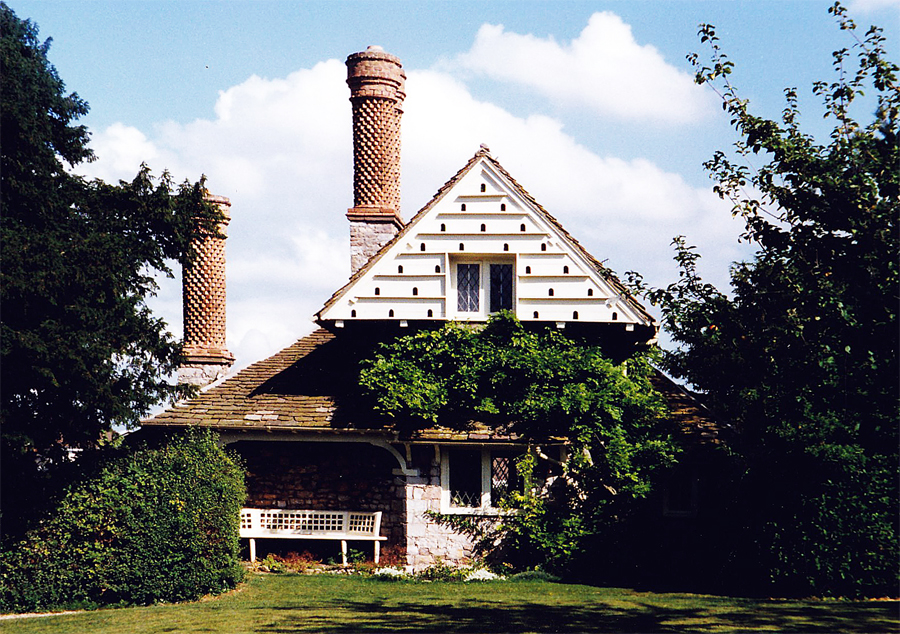
Vine Cottage, Blaise Hamlet, John Nash, 1812

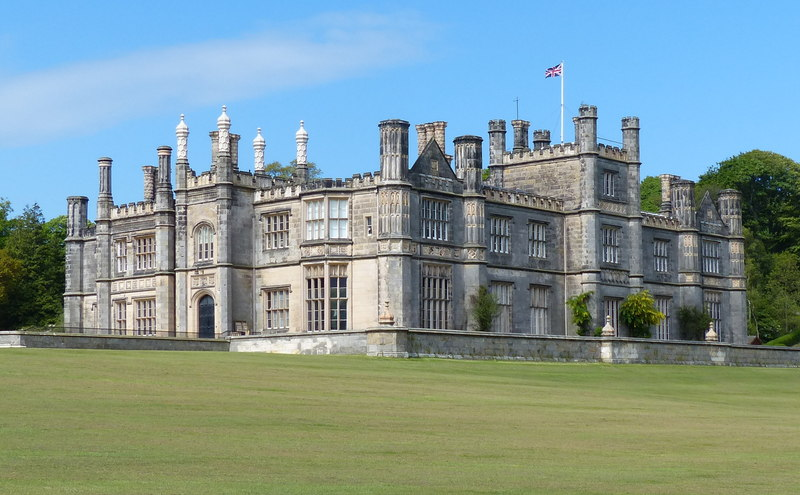
Dalmeny House near Edinburgh, 1817, by William Wilkins

Although the Gothic style remained popular in Britain well into the Renaissance and Baroque periods, by the end of the 16th century, it had subsided completely in the wake of classicism. While domestic and palace architecture changed rapidly according to contemporary taste, few notable churches were constructed after the Reformation; instead, old gothic buildings were retained and adapted to Protestant use. In contexts where conservatism and traditionalism had great value (e.g., within the Church of England and at the Universities of Oxford and Cambridge) building additions and annexes were often designed to blend or harmonize rather than contrast with the archaic style of the older work. Christopher Wren's steeple of St Dunstan-in-the-East (London,1668–71) and Tom Tower at Christ Church, Oxford (1681–82), and Nicholas Hawksmoor's Codrington Library and Front Quad at All Souls College, Oxford (1751) are the most notable examples of "Gothic survival" in the Baroque period. (Note: Wren consciously set out to imitate Cardinal Wolsey's architectural style. Writing to Dean Fell in 1681, he noted; "I resolved it ought to be Gothic to agree with the Founder's work", adding that to do otherwise would lead to "an unhandsome medley". Pevsner suggests that he succeeded "to the extent that innocent visitors never notice the difference".)

As the last and most recent phase of the Gothic period, the Tudor style had the most secular survivals in 17th and 18th-century England; many older buildings were rebuilt, added to, or redecorated with ornament in the Tudor period. As such, the Tudor style had perhaps an over-sized influence on the image formed by the Georgians of their medieval past. Before the various phases of medieval architecture had been well identified and studied, and designers such as A.W.N. Pugin and George Gilbert Scott had advocated for the use of the Decorated gothic rather than the perpendicular, Tudor elements figured heavily in the early examples of the Gothic Revival. Horace Walpole's Strawberry Hill House at Twickenham (1749–76; designed in collaboration with Richard Bentley, John Chute, and James Essex) features elements derived from late gothic precedents.

In the group of nine cottages at Blaise Hamlet, built around 1810–1811 by a Bristol banker for his retired employees, John Nash demonstrated a remarkably forward-looking selective appropriation of Tudor vernacular architecture such as fancy twisted brick chimney-stacks to make picturesque and comfortable middle-class homes. Several have thatched roofs, some at two levels in a completely unnecessary but very picturesque way. Nash published an illustrated book on the group; (Note: Nash also undertook the design of a number of larger mansions in the Tudor style, of which Longner Hall in Shropshire is the only surviving example.) this was a formula with a future. In contrast with Nash's Blaise Hamlet, Dalmeny House near Edinburgh, built in 1817 for Archibald Primrose, 4th Earl of Rosebery, is a large stately home in a revival of the early Tudor palace style, drawing in particular from East Barsham Manor in Norfolk, built c. 1520. (Note: Pevsner describes Wilkins' Dalmeny as "the finest of his houses in (the Tudor Gothic) style". The Roseberys originally lived at Barnbougle Castle, directly on the shoreline of the Firth of Forth. They built Dalmeny further inland, reputedly after the third earl was "drenched by a huge wave" while at dinner.) At this time the style was known as "Old English", and considered especially appropriate for vicarages and rectories, partly because they were usually next to the church, which was likely to be Gothic, and because the larger windows patrons wanted were easier to work into the style than into a "pointed" Gothic. At this stage it was essentially a style for the country rather than houses in towns. Tudor style was "almost infinitely adaptable, particularly to low, spreading houses", After about 1850 "Old English" came to mean a rather different style based on vernacular architecture, although some Tudor features such as tall brick chimneys often remained.

Examples of the Tudor or Perpendicular Gothic period also influenced new institutional buildings beginning in the 1820s. The architect of Dalmeny, William Wilkins, followed the precedent of Wren and Hawksmoor in designing new quads for various Cambridge colleges in a historic mode including New Court, Corpus Christi College, Cambridge (1822–27); Front Court, King's College, Cambridge (1824–28); and New Court, Trinity College, Cambridge (1825). In a similar vein, Henry Hutchinson & Thomas Rickman contributed the New Court and Bridge of Sighs at St. John's College, Cambridge (1826–31). St. Luke's, Chelsea by James Savage (1824) is one of the finest early revivalist church buildings in England and shows the influence of Perpendicular Gothic design.

=== 20th century ===
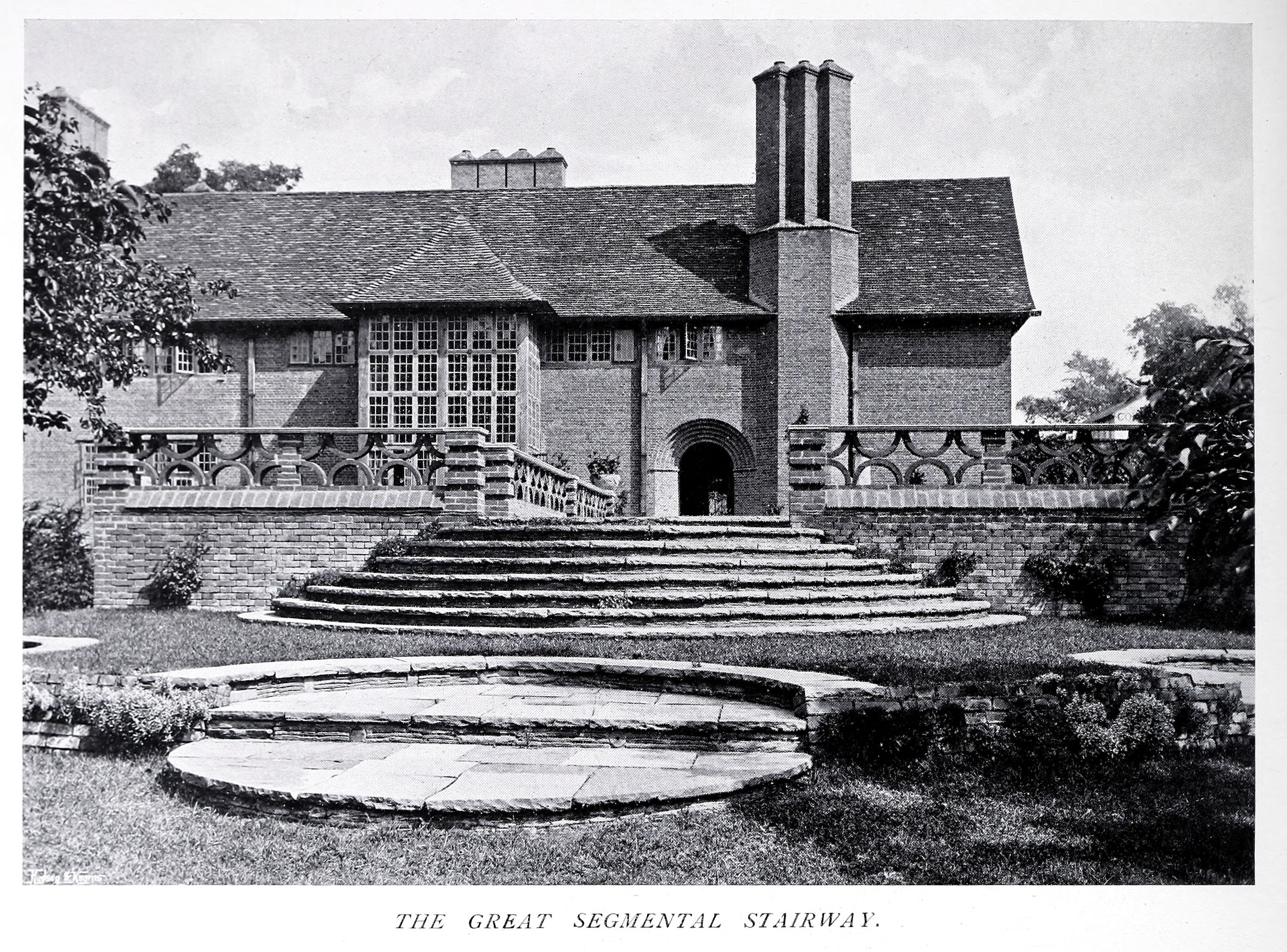
Lutyens' houses, here quite conventional in 1899, were to evolve still further from their Tudor roots

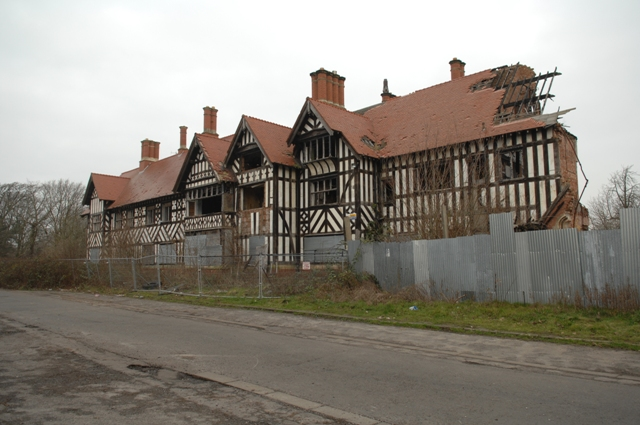
Greaves Hall Country House and Hospital in Lancashire, England, demolished in 2009 after being a residential mental health hospital from 1954 until its closure in 1992

In the early part of the 20th century, one of the exponents who developed the style further was Edwin Lutyens (1864–1944). At The Deanery in Berkshire, 1899, where the client was the editor of the influential magazine Country Life, details like the openwork brick balustrade, the many-paned oriel window and facetted staircase tower, the shadowed windows under the eaves, or the prominent clustered chimneys were conventional Tudor Revival borrowings, some of which Lutyens was to remake in his own style, that already predominates in the dark recessed entryway, the confident massing, and his signature semi-circular terrace steps. This is Tudorbethan at its best, free in ground plan, stripped of cuteness, yet warmly vernacular in effect, familiar though new, eminently liveable. The Deanery was another example of the "naturalistic" approach; an anonymous reviewer for Country Life in 1903 wrote; "So naturally has the house been planned that it seems to have grown out of the landscape rather than to have been fitted into it". An example of Tudorbethan architecture was that seen at Greaves Hall, which was built in 1900 as a mansion house for the Scarisbrick family. Many of the features of the original building could still be seen until it was demolished in 2009.

Later came Mackay Hugh Baillie Scott (1865–1945) and Blair Imrie who made their names as Tudor style architects. Lutyens though took the style away from what is generally understood as Tudor Revival creating a further highly personalised style of his own. His buildings coupled with their often accompanying gardens by Gertrude Jekyll, while in a style thought of as "olde world" would not be recognisable to inhabitants of the 16th century. Another noted practitioner was George A. Crawley. A decorator and designer, rather than an architect, Crawley greatly expanded the original medieval hall house, Crowhurst Place in Surrey, firstly for himself and latterly for Consuelo Vanderbilt. The result, "remarkable in its own right", saw Crawley add extensions, chimneys, gables, linenfold panelling and large amounts of half-timbering. Martin Conway, writing in Country Life, considered Crawley's reconstruction gave the remains of the original manor, "a beauty far greater than was ever theirs in the days of its newness". Ian Nairn, Nikolaus Pevsner and Bridget Cherry, in the 1971 revised Surrey Pevsner Buildings of England, note the sense of escapism which inspired much of the Tudor Revival, calling Crowhurst, "an extreme example of the English flight from reality around the 1914–18 war".

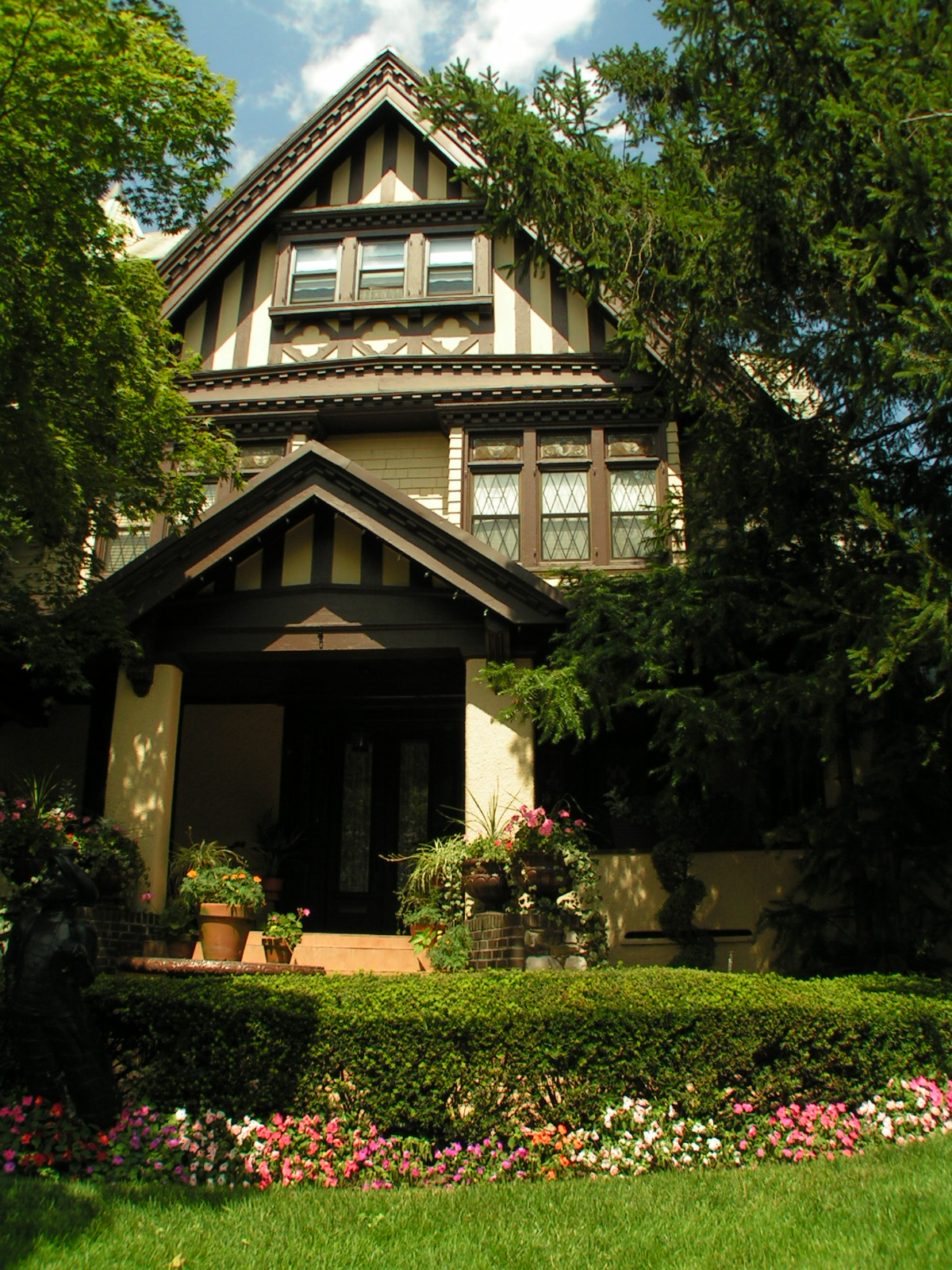
Tudor Revival features on the 1899 Saitta House, a Queen Anne Victorian, located in Dyker Heights, Brooklyn, New York

Following the First World War many London outer suburbs had developments of houses in the style, all reflecting the taste for nostalgia for rural values. In the first half of the 20th century, increasingly minimal "Tudor" references for "instant" atmosphere in speculative construction cheapened the style. The writer Olive Cook had this debased approach firmly in her sights when she attacked, "the rash of semi-detached villas, bedizened with Tudor gables, mock half-timber work, rough cast and bay windows of every shape which disfigures the outskirts of all our towns". It was also copied in many areas of the world, including the United States and Canada. New York City suburbs such as Westchester County, New York and Englewood and Teaneck, New Jersey feature particularly dense concentrations of Tudor Revival construction from this period.

Brewery companies designed "improved" pubs, some in a mock Tudor style called Brewer's Tudor. The style was captured in John Betjeman's 1937 poem Slough, where "bald young clerks" gather:

And talk of sport and makes of cars
In various bogus-Tudor bars
And daren't look up and see the stars.

The late 20th century has seen a change in the faithfulness of emulation of the style, since in a modern development it is common to have only a few basic floor plans for buildings, these combined with variations in interior surface treatment and in the exterior in rooflines and setbacks to provide a visual variety to the street view. Owing to the smaller lots employed in modern developments (especially in the Western US), Tudor Revival may be placed directly next to an unrelated style such as French or Italian Provincial, resulting in an eclectic mix. The style has also been deployed for commercial developments; the architectural historian Anthony Quiney describes the Broadway Centre in the London borough of Ealing, "dressed out with brick and tile, arches, gables and small window panes, all to put a smile on a friendly face - the mask of tradition".

=== 21st century ===
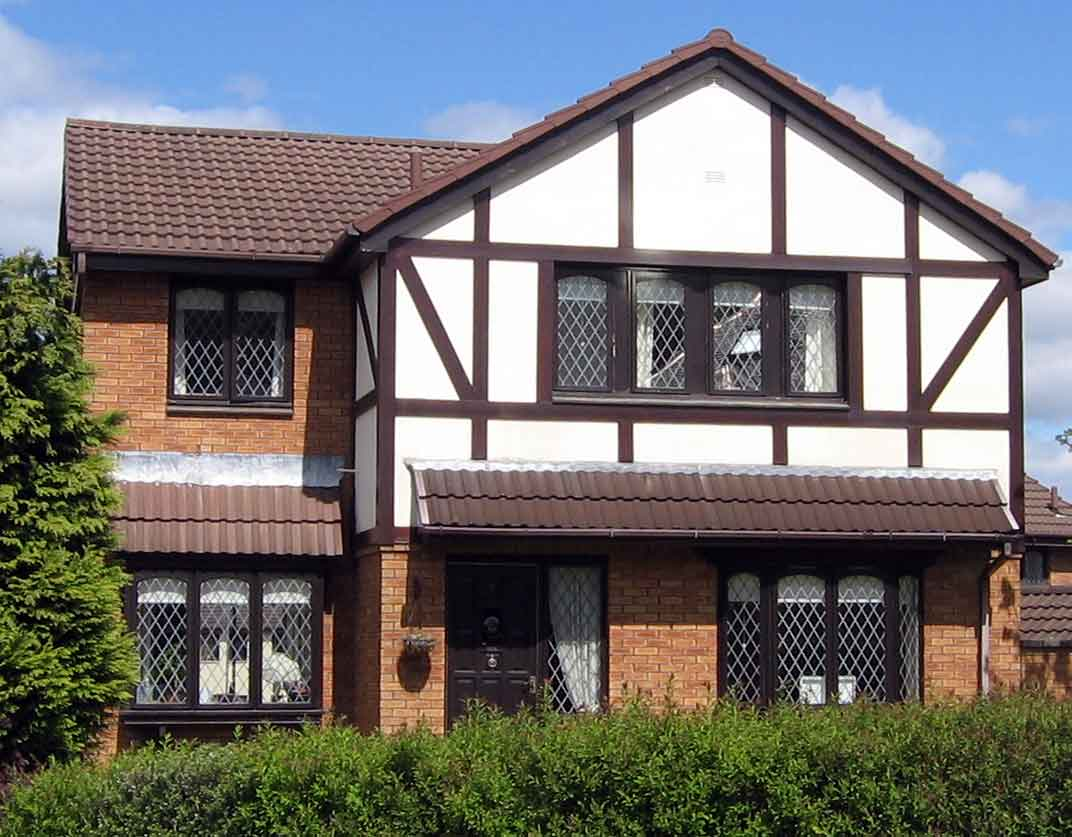
Modern mock Tudor house in Greenock, Scotland

Many British builders include variations on Tudorbethan in the range of styles they draw on, and the style tends to be associated with pastiche. Architects are rarely requested to work in the style, and though current postmodern architecture includes a much wider range of styles than the modernism associated with the mid-20th century, few architects are known for buildings which could be called "Tudorbethan".

In modern structures, usually on estates of private houses, a half-timbered appearance is obtained by applied decorative features over the "real" structure, typically wood stud framing or concrete block masonry. A combination of boards and stucco is applied to obtain the desired appearance, here seen in the image to the right. To minimise maintenance, the "boards" are now commonly made of uPVC faux wood, plastic or fibre reinforced cement siding with a dark brown or wood effect finish. In the United States, the style is often further modified by painting the timbers colors such as blue or green. The Tudor Revival style was most popular for new American homes in the 1970s and 1980s. Today, it is rarely considered for residential construction in that country as Italian, Mediterranean, and French villa style homes have superseded them in popularity.

== Evolution ==
The Tudor Revival style was a reaction to the ornate Victorian Gothic Revival of the second half of the 19th century. Rejecting mass production that was introduced by industry at that time, the Arts and Crafts movement, closely related to Tudorbethan, drew on simple design inherent in aspects of its more ancient styles, Tudor, Elizabethan and Jacobean.

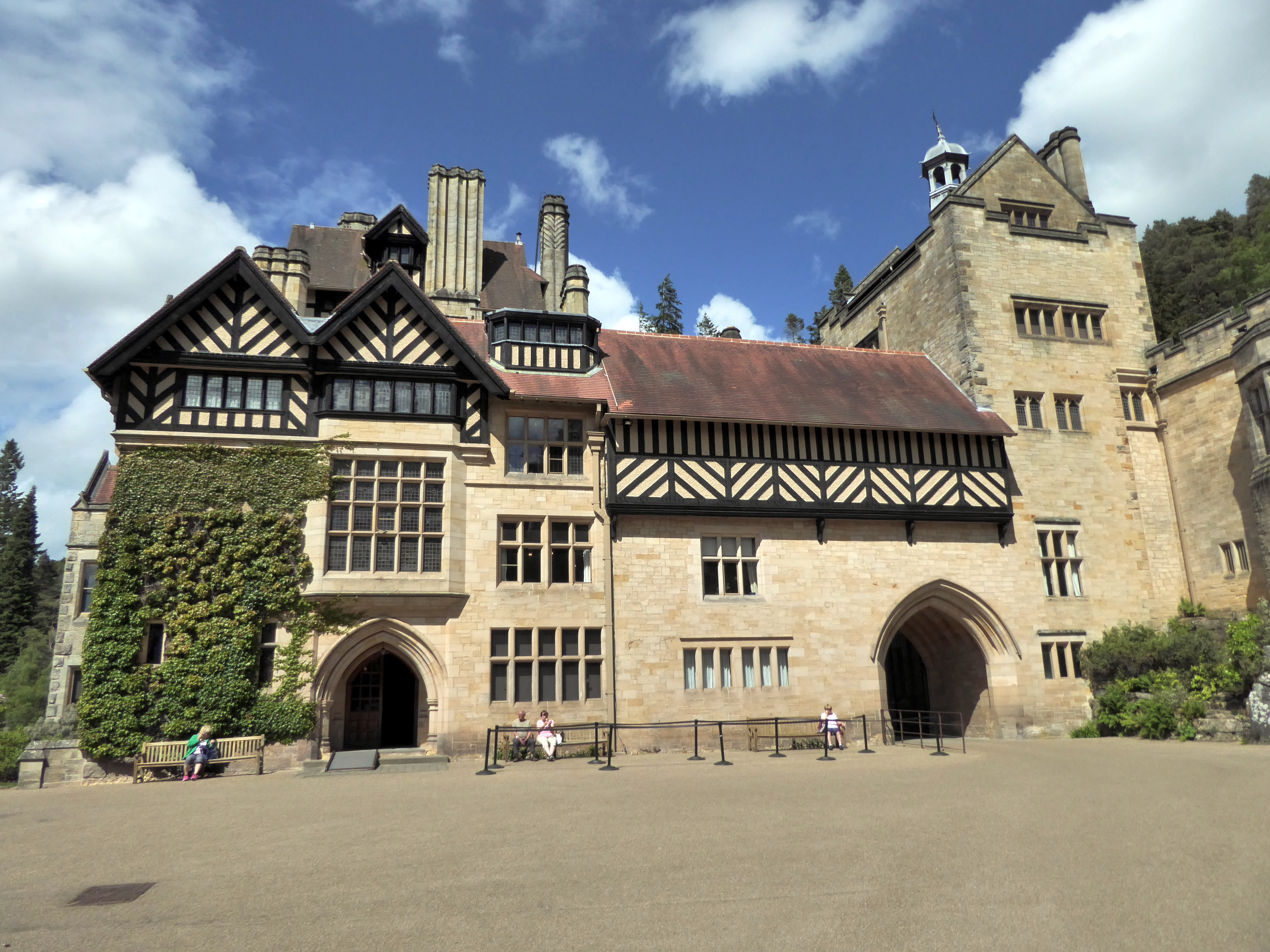
Cragside - the south front

The Tudor style made one of its first appearances in Britain in the late 1860s at Cragside, a hilltop mansion of eclectic architectural styles that incorporated certain Tudor features; Cragside was designed by the architect Norman Shaw. Shaw sketched out the whole design for the "future fairy palace" in a single afternoon, while his client Lord Armstrong and his guests were out on a shooting party. Pevsner noted its derivation from "the Tudor style, both in its stone and its black-and-white versions". The half-timbering has been criticised as unfaithful to the vernacular tradition of the North-East of England, but the architectural historian Mark Girouard explained Shaw's picturesque motivation; desiring it for "romantic effect, he reached out for it like an artist reaching out for a tube of colour".

At approximately the same time, Shaw also designed Leyswood near Withyham in East Sussex, which was a large mansion around a courtyard, complete with mock battlements, towers, half-timbered upper facades and tall chimneys – all features quite readily associated with Tudor architecture; in Shaw's hands, this less fantastical style achieved immediate maturity. Confusingly, it was then promptly named "Queen Anne style", when in reality it combined a revival of Elizabethan and Jacobean design details including mullioned and oriel windows. The style later began to incorporate the classic pre-Georgian features that are generally understood to represent "Queen Anne" in Britain. The term "Queen Anne" for this style of architecture is now the only common U.S. style. While in Britain the style remained closer to its Tudor roots, in the U.S., it evolved into a form of architecture not instantly recognisable as that constructed in either the Tudor or Queen Anne period.

The style was also utilised for public buildings; an early example was the Great Hall and Library at Lincoln's Inn in central London, built in the late 1840s. The architect was Philip Hardwick, better known for the classical Euston Arch. The historian Michael Hall considers the hall and library among "the finest Tudor Revival buildings (of) the nineteenth century.

=== Tudorbethan ===
Tudorbethan represents a subset of Tudor Revival architecture; the word is modelled on John Betjeman's 1933 coinage of the "Jacobethan" style, which he used to describe the grand mixed revival style of circa 1835–1885 that had been called things like "Free English Renaissance". This was generally modelled on the grand prodigy houses built by the courtiers of Elizabeth I and James VI. "Tudorbethan" took it a step further, eliminated the hexagonal or many-faceted towers and mock battlements of Jacobethan, and applied the more domestic styles of "Merrie England", which were cosier and quaint. It was associated with the Arts and Crafts movement. Outside North America, Tudorbethan is also used synonymously with Tudor Revival and mock Tudor.

== Half-timbering ==
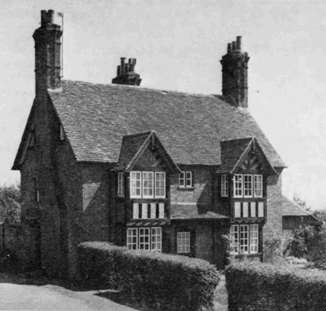
Two semi-detached cottages at Mentmore appear as one Tudor-style house, built circa 1870

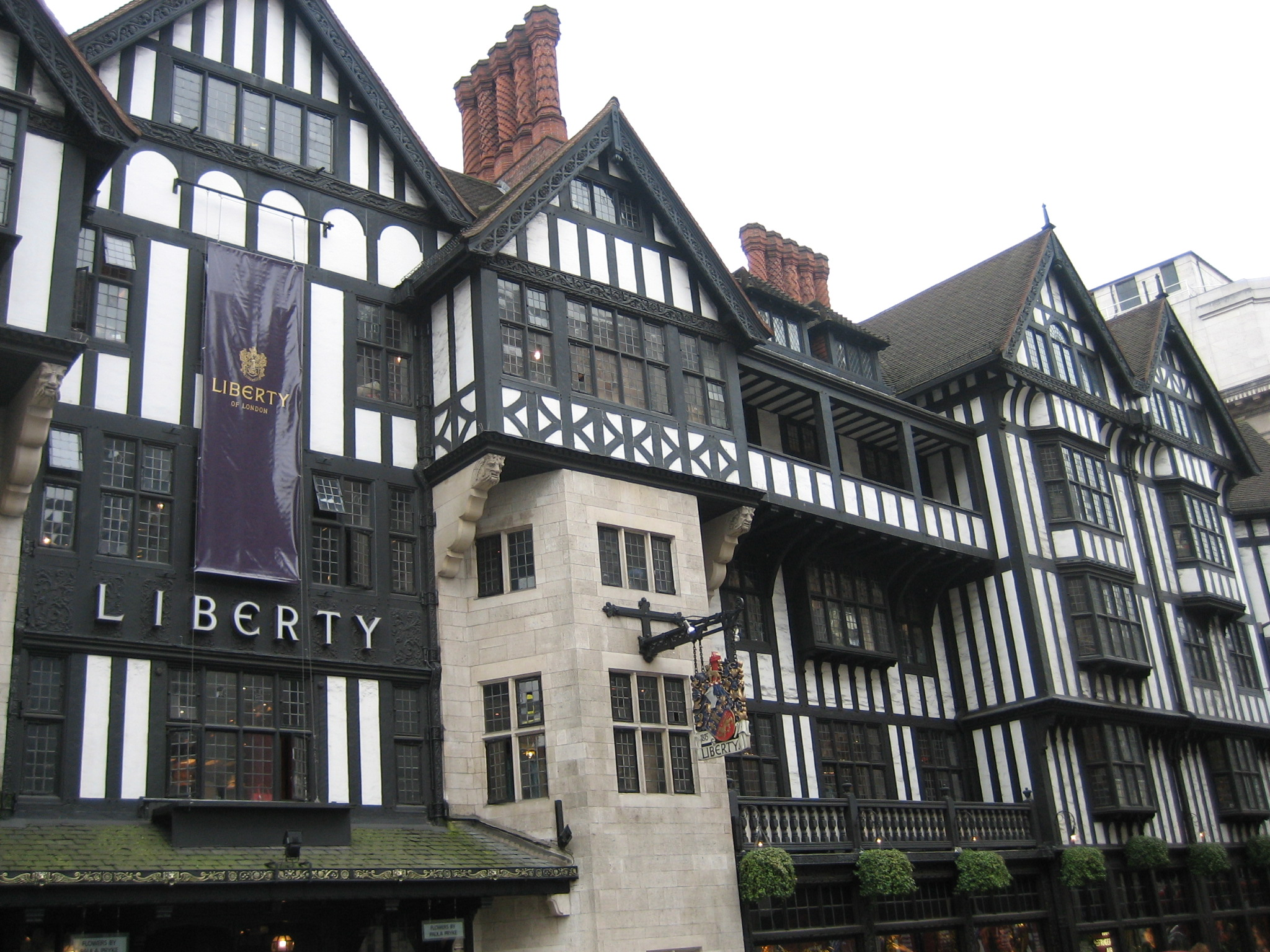
The Liberty & Co. department store in London, built in 1924 to emulate a half-timbered mansion.

From the 1880s onward, Tudor Revival concentrated more on the simple but quaintly picturesque Elizabethan cottage, rather than the brick and battlemented splendours of Hampton Court or Compton Wynyates. Large and small houses alike with half-timbering in their upper storeys and gables were completed with tall ornamental chimneys, in what was originally a simple cottage style. It was here that the influences of the arts and crafts movement became apparent.

Tudor Revival houses are dissimilar to the timber-framed structures of the originals, in which the frame supported the whole weight of the house. Their modern counterparts consist of bricks or blocks of various materials, stucco, or even simple studwall framing, with a lookalike "frame" of thin boards added on the outside to mimic the earlier functional and structural weight-bearing heavy timbers. An example of this is the "simple cottage" style of Ascott House in Buckinghamshire. This was designed by Devey for the Rothschild family, who were among the earliest patrons and promoters of this style. Simon Jenkins suggests that Ascott, "a half-timbered, heavily gabled, overgrown cottage, proves the appeal of Tudor to every era and condition of England". Devey's work at St Alban's Court and elsewhere incorporated other features of the Tudor Revival style such as "hung tiles and patterned brickwork". At St Alban's he also made use of rag-stone footings to create the impression of a Tudor mansion built "on the stone of medieval foundations".

Some more enlightened landlords at this time became more aware of the needs for proper sanitation and housing for their employees, and some estate villages were rebuilt to resemble what was thought to be an idyllic Elizabethan village, often grouped around a village green and pond; Mentmore in Buckinghamshire is an example of this, Pevsner noting the "Arts-and-Crafts (and) cottage orné" building styles. The Tudor Revival, though, now concentrated on the picturesque. This combined with a desire for "naturalness", an intention to make buildings appear as if they had developed organically over the centuries, which the architectural historian James Stevens Curl considered "one of the most significant of English contributions to architecture". An example is the "Tudor Village" constructed by Frank Loughborough Pearson for his client William Waldorf Astor at Hever Castle in Kent. Pearson went to considerable lengths to source genuine Elizabethan building materials for the cottages, including stone, tiles and bricks, leading Astor to comment; "I could not believe they had been built a few short months ago, they looked so old and crooked".

A very well-known example of the idealised half-timbered style is Liberty & Co. department store in London, which was built in the style of a vast half-timbered Tudor mansion. The store specialised, among other goods, in fabrics and furnishings by the leading designers of the Arts and Crafts movement. (Note: Pevsner records that the timbers used on Liberty's Great Marlborough Street frontage were the "real article (sourced) from genuine men-of-war, the Hindustan and the Impregnable" and that, unusually for Tudor Revival buildings, they were "pegged and mortised, not just stuck on".)

== Interiors ==
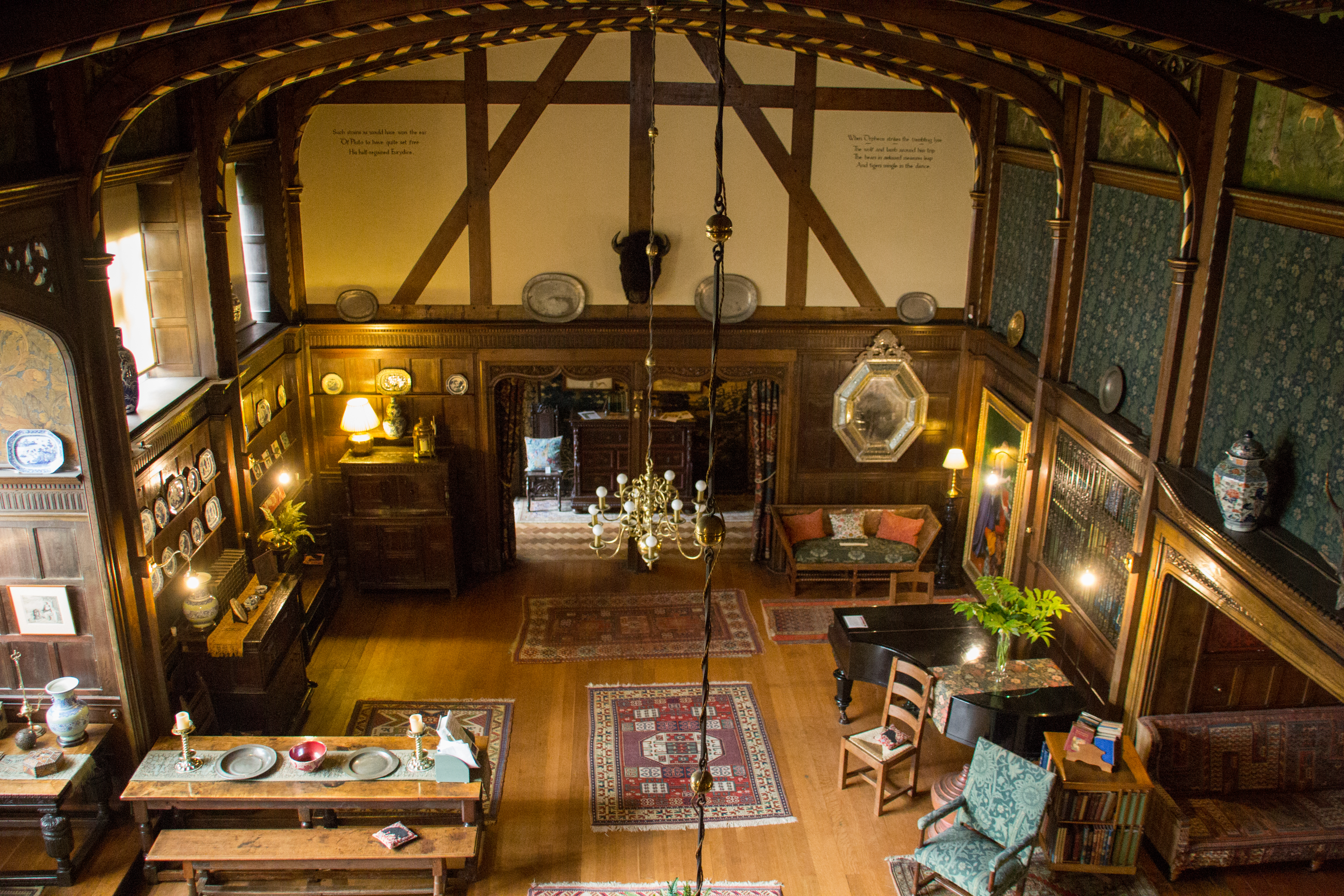
Recreation of a great hall at Wightwick Manor

The interiors of the Tudor style building have evolved considerably along with the style, often becoming truer to the replicated era than were the first examples of the revival style, where the style "rarely went far indoors". At Ascott House, Devey's great masterpiece constructed throughout the last twenty years of the 19th century, the interior was remodelled thirty years later. The Tudor Revival style was considered passé and was replaced by the fashionable Curzon Street Baroque sweeping away the inglenook fireplaces and heavy oak panelling. (Note: Inglenook fireplaces were a regular feature of Tudor Revival interiors and a particular speciality of Richard Norman Shaw. He built his first at Cranbrook for John Calcott Horsley, who later introduced Shaw to Lord Armstrong. As well as those at Cragside, two notable examples were created for the now-demolished Dawpool Hall on the Wirral. One of these now forms the porch of The Pantheon at Portmeirion and the other went unsold on eBay in 2012. Shaw's biographer, Andrew Saint writes, "inglenooks are the decorative pièce de résistance of the Shaw country house".) the large airy rooms are in fact more redolent of the 18th century than the 16th. Cragside is slightly more true to its theme, although the rooms are very large, some contain Tudor style panelling, and the dining room contains are monumental inglenook, but this is more in the style of Italian Renaissance meets Camelot than Tudor. While in the cottages at Mentmore the interiors are no different from those of any lower middle-class Victorian small household. An example of a Tudor Revival house where the exterior and interior were treated with equal care is Old Place, Lindfield, West Sussex. The property, comprising an original house of c.1590, was developed by the stained glass designer Charles Eamer Kempe from the 1870s. The architect George Frederick Bodley described the rooms as "a series of pictures" and an article in Country Life asking whether "anything could be more English in character than Old Place", was written when much of the house was barely 10 years old.

In some of the larger Tudor style houses the Tudor great hall would be suggested by the reception hall, often furnished as a sitting or dining room. Large wooden staircases of several flights were often prominently positioned, based on Jacobean prototypes. It is this mingling of styles that has led to the term Jacobethan which resulted in houses such as Harlaxton Manor which bore little if any resemblance to a building from either period. Hall notes the influence of Burghley House and Wollaton Hall, "fused with ideas drawn from Continental architecture of the seventeenth and eighteenth centuries".

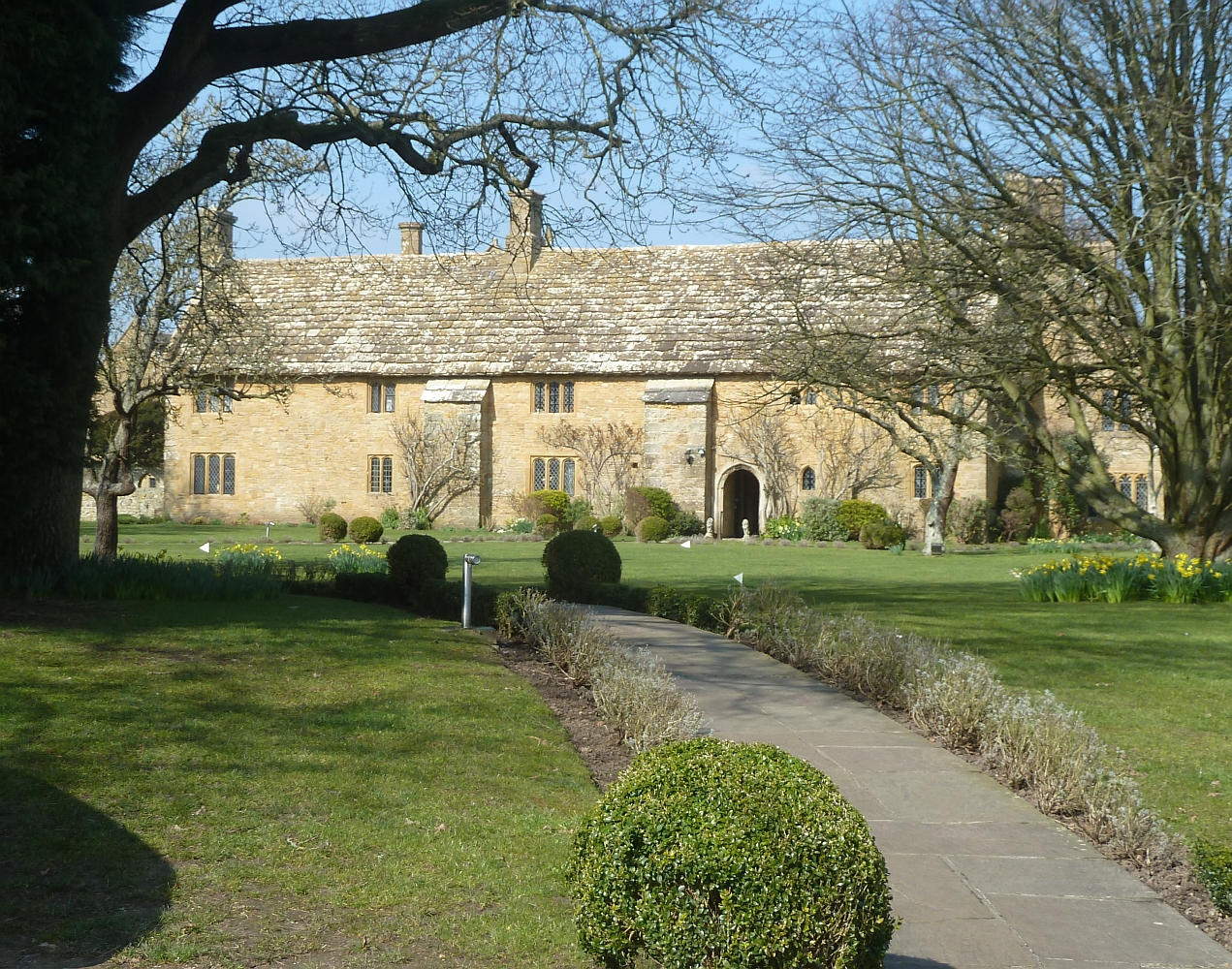
Baliffscourt - Lord Moyne's "extreme Tudor taste"

More often it is in the Tudor style houses of the very early 20th century that a greater devotion to the Tudor period is found, with appropriate interior layout, albeit coupled with modern-day comforts. This can be seen in older upscale neighbourhoods where the lots are sufficiently large to allow the house to have an individual presence, despite variations in the style of neighboring houses. Whether of older or recent origin, the appearance of solid beams and half-timbered exterior walls is only superficial. Artificially aged and blackened beams are constructed from light wood, bear no loads, and are attached to ceilings and walls purely for decoration, while artificial flames leap from wrought iron fire-dogs in an inglenook often a third of the size of the room in which they are situated. Occasionally, owners sought to replicate more closely the conditions of Tudor living; an example were the Moynes at Baliffscourt in West Sussex, a house which Clive Aslet describes as "the most extreme - and most successful - of all Tudor taste country houses". Lord Moyne's wife, Evelyn, a society hostess, employed the amateur architect Amyas Philips to create a house inspired by the medieval Baliffscourt Chapel which stood on the site. The cloister-like design required visitors to leave the house and access their bedrooms via external staircases. Chips Channon, the diarist and politician described the bedrooms themselves as "decorated to resemble the cell of a rather 'pansy' monk". The novelist E. F. Benson satirised the style in his book Queen Lucia; "the famous smoking-parlour, with rushes on the floor, a dresser ranged with pewter tankards, and leaded lattice-windows of glass so antique that it was practically impossible to see out of them...sconces on the walls held dim iron lamps, so that only those of the most acute vision were able to read".

== Gallery ==
=== Europe ===
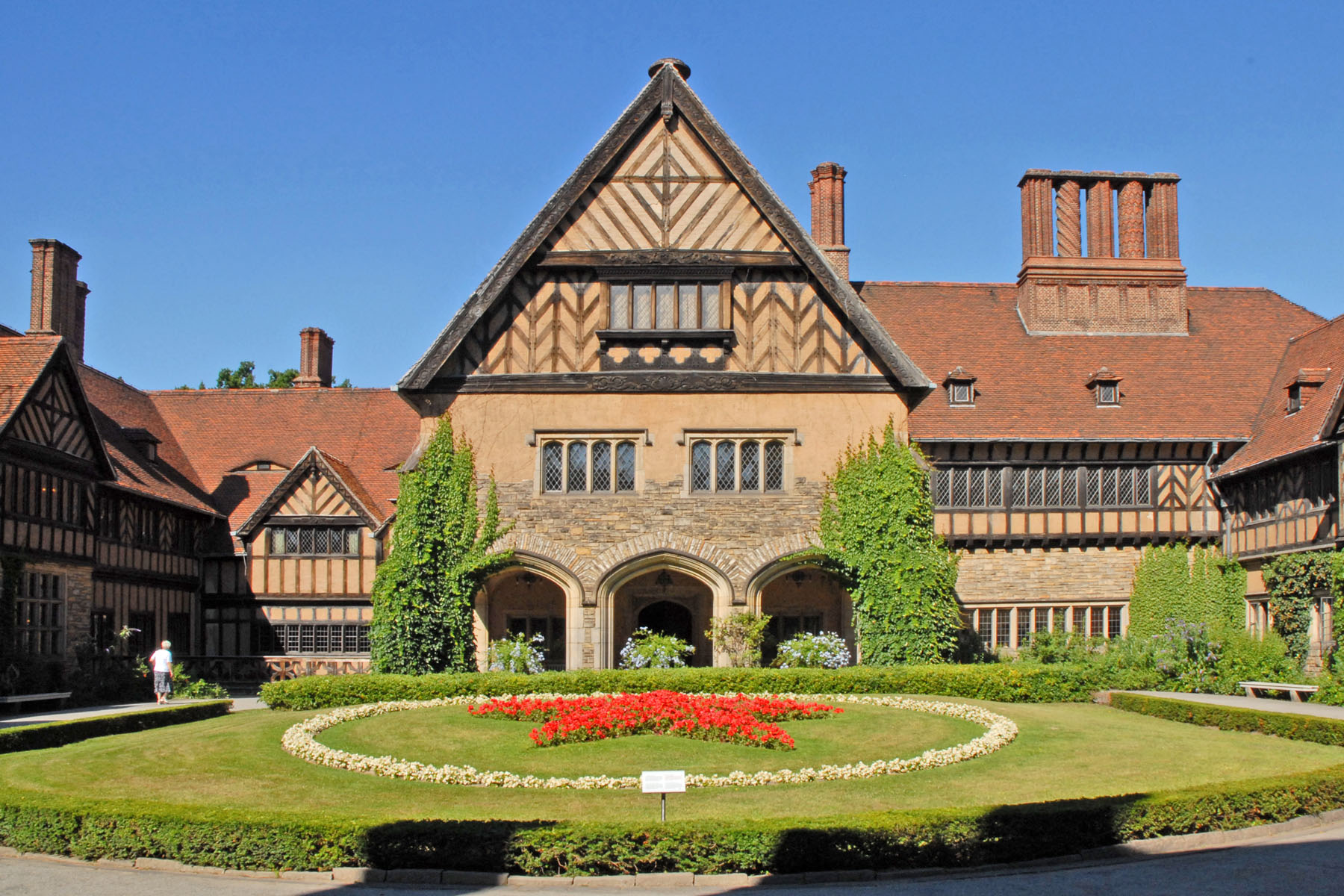
Cecilienhof in Potsdam, Germany 1913–1917

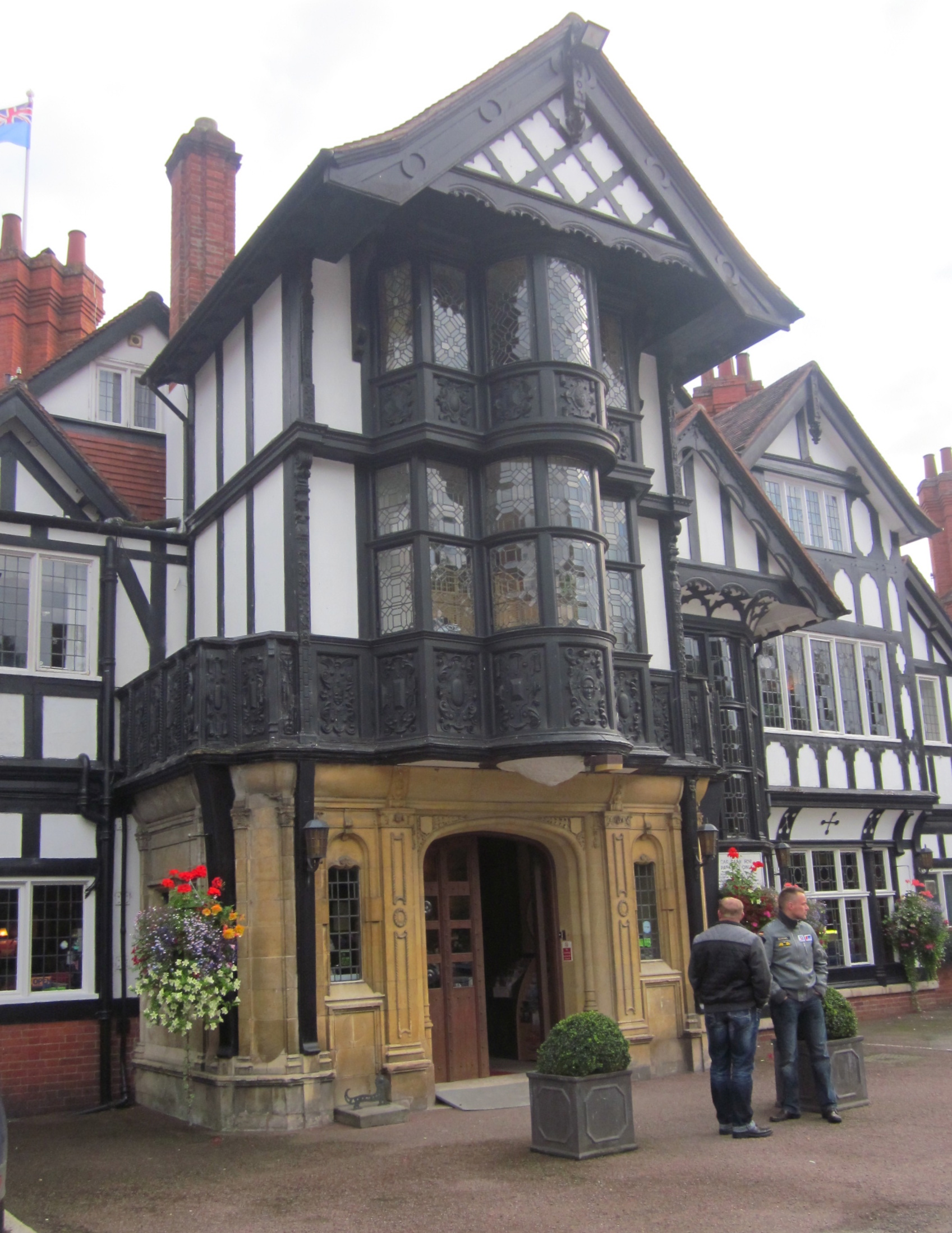
Petwood Hotel, Woodall Spa, England (1905)

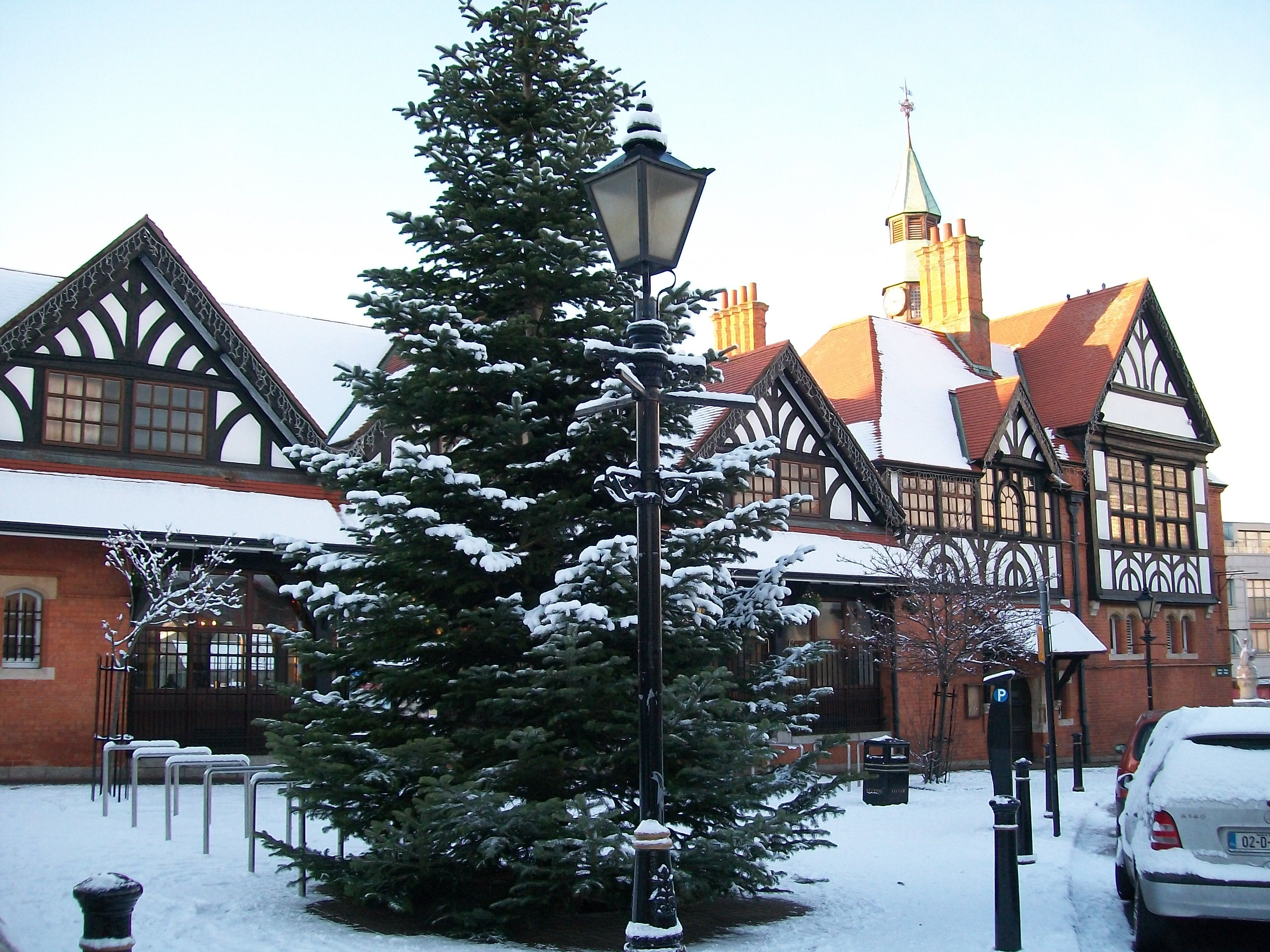
Bray Town Hall, Bray, County Wicklow, Ireland

=== North America ===
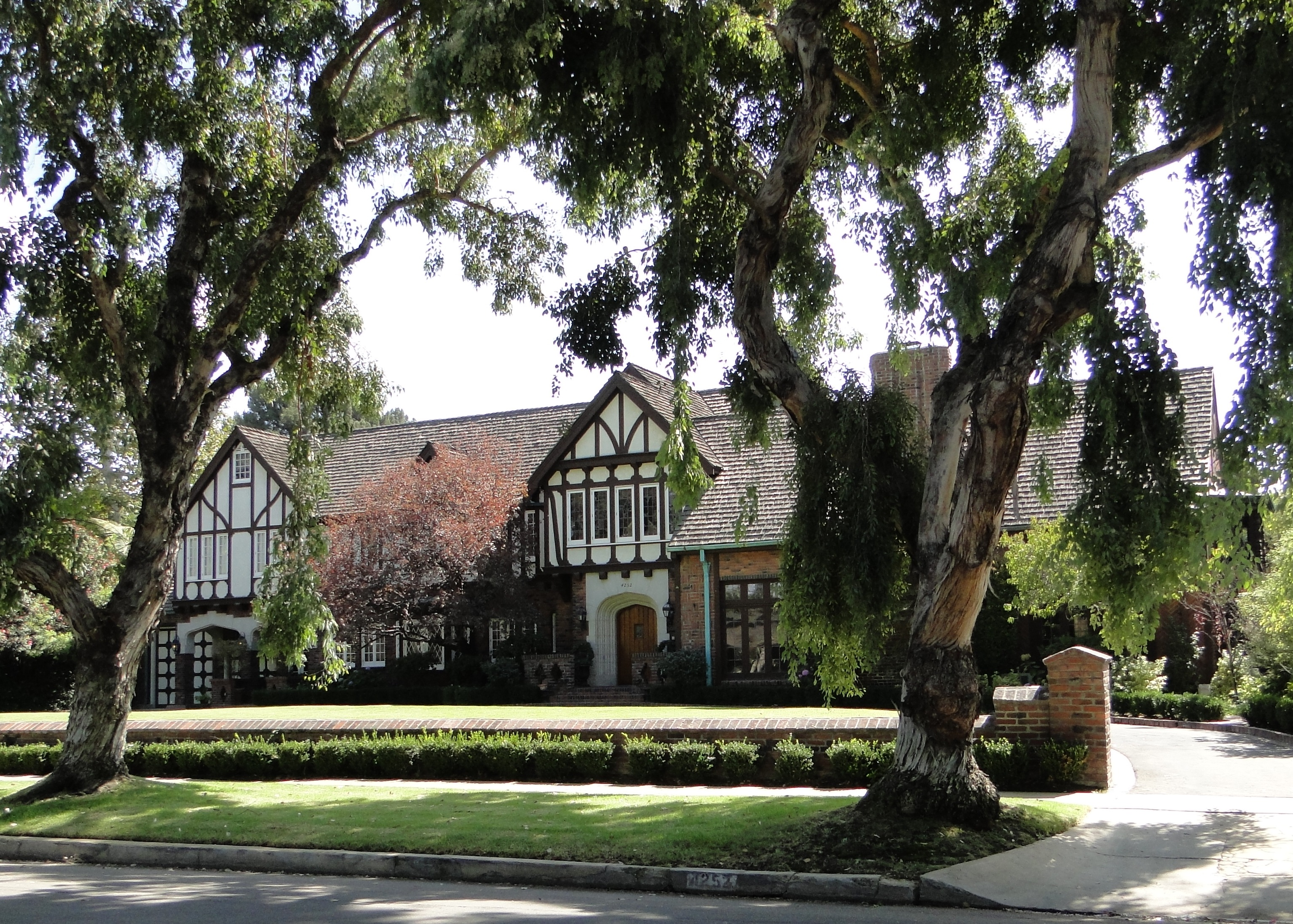
Leonie Pray House (1927), Long Beach, California

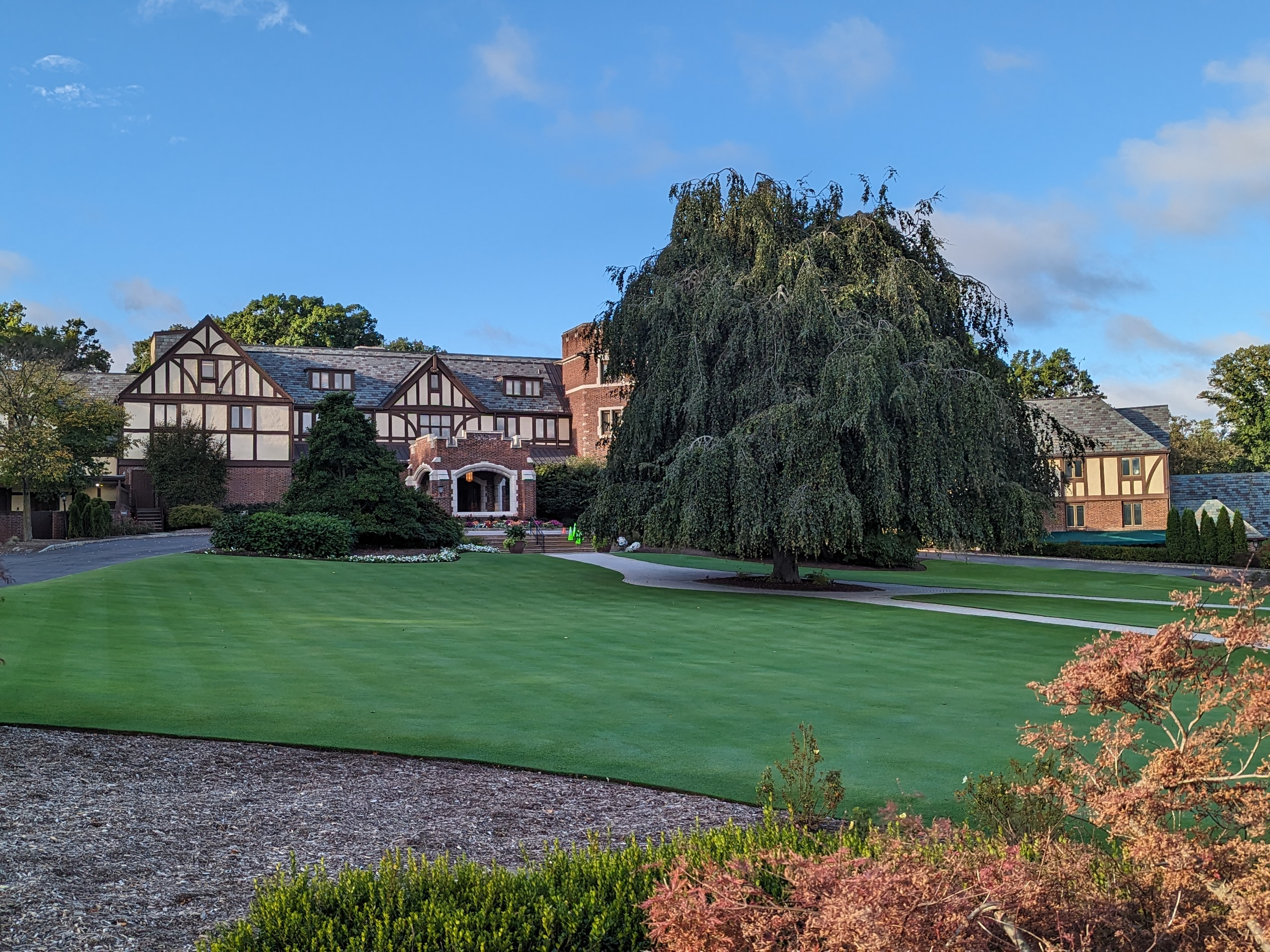
Oak Hill Country Club in Rochester, New York

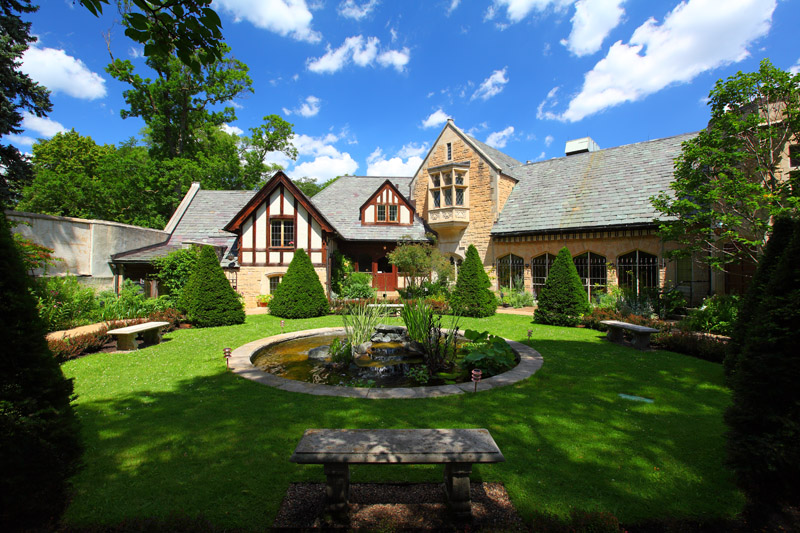
The Bakken Museum in Minneapolis, Minnesota, built 1928–1930

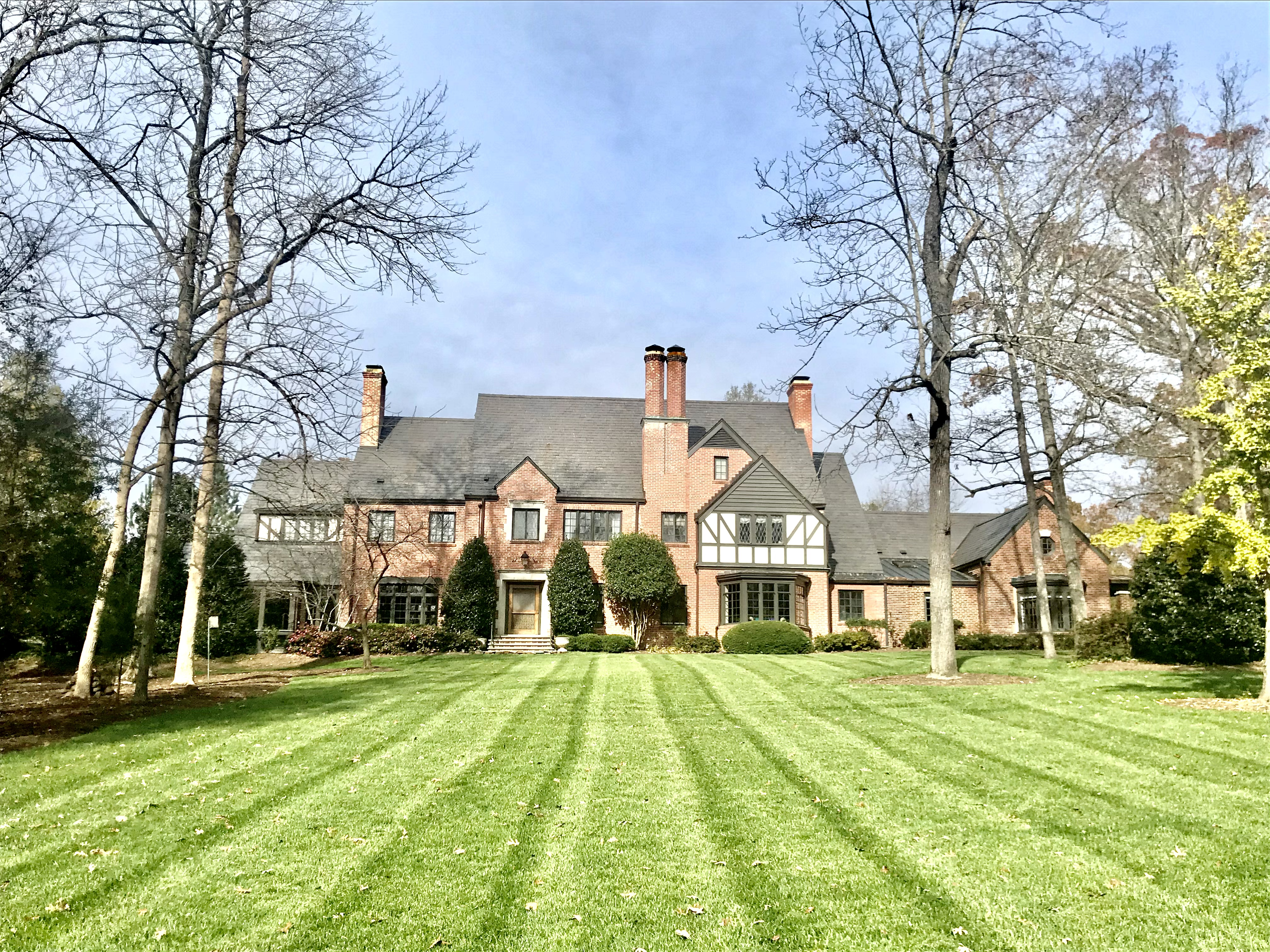
J. Deryl Hart House, built c.1934

Cammack House in Huntington, West Virginia, built 1923

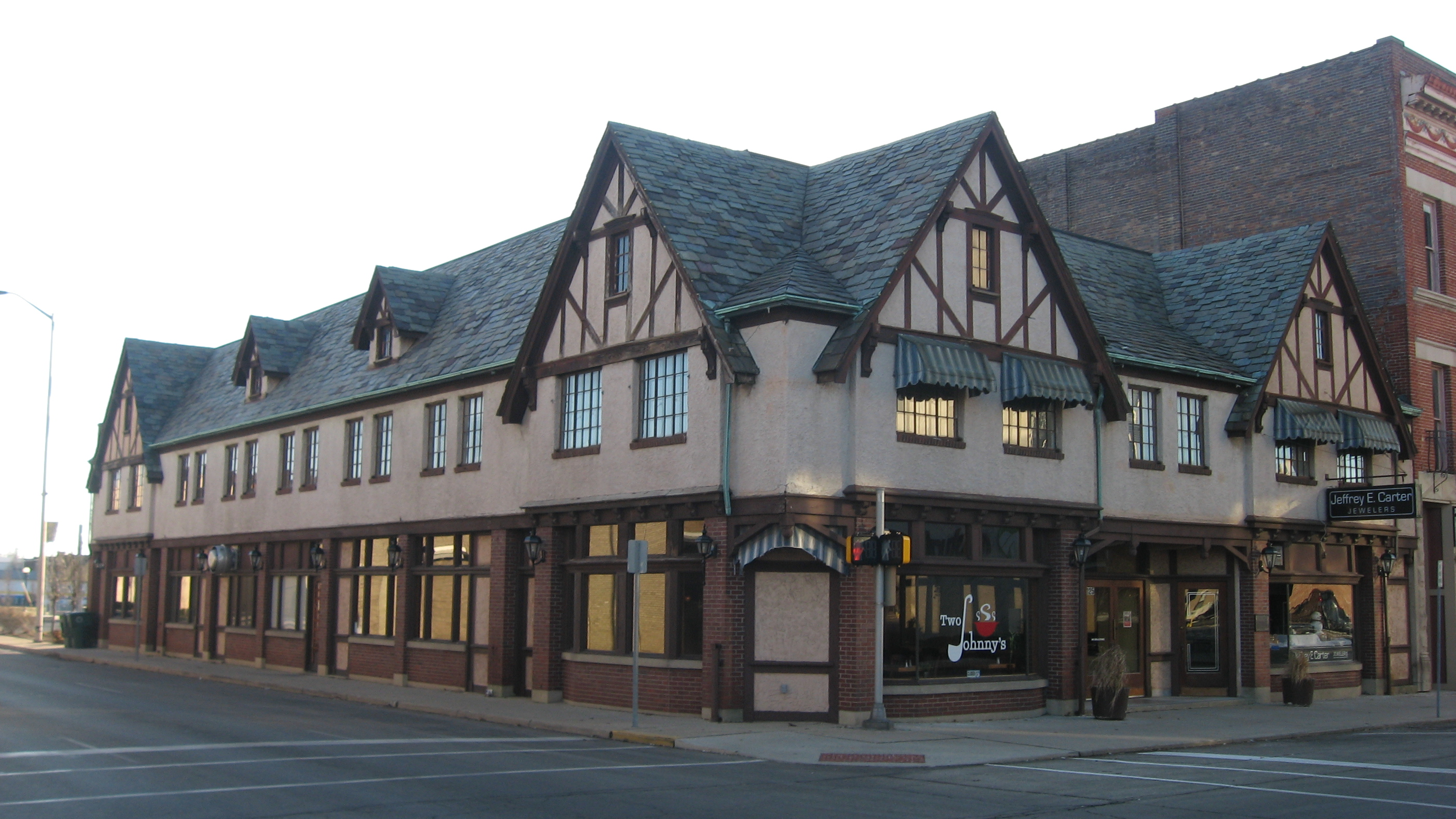
F.D. Rose Building in Muncie, Indiana, built 1926

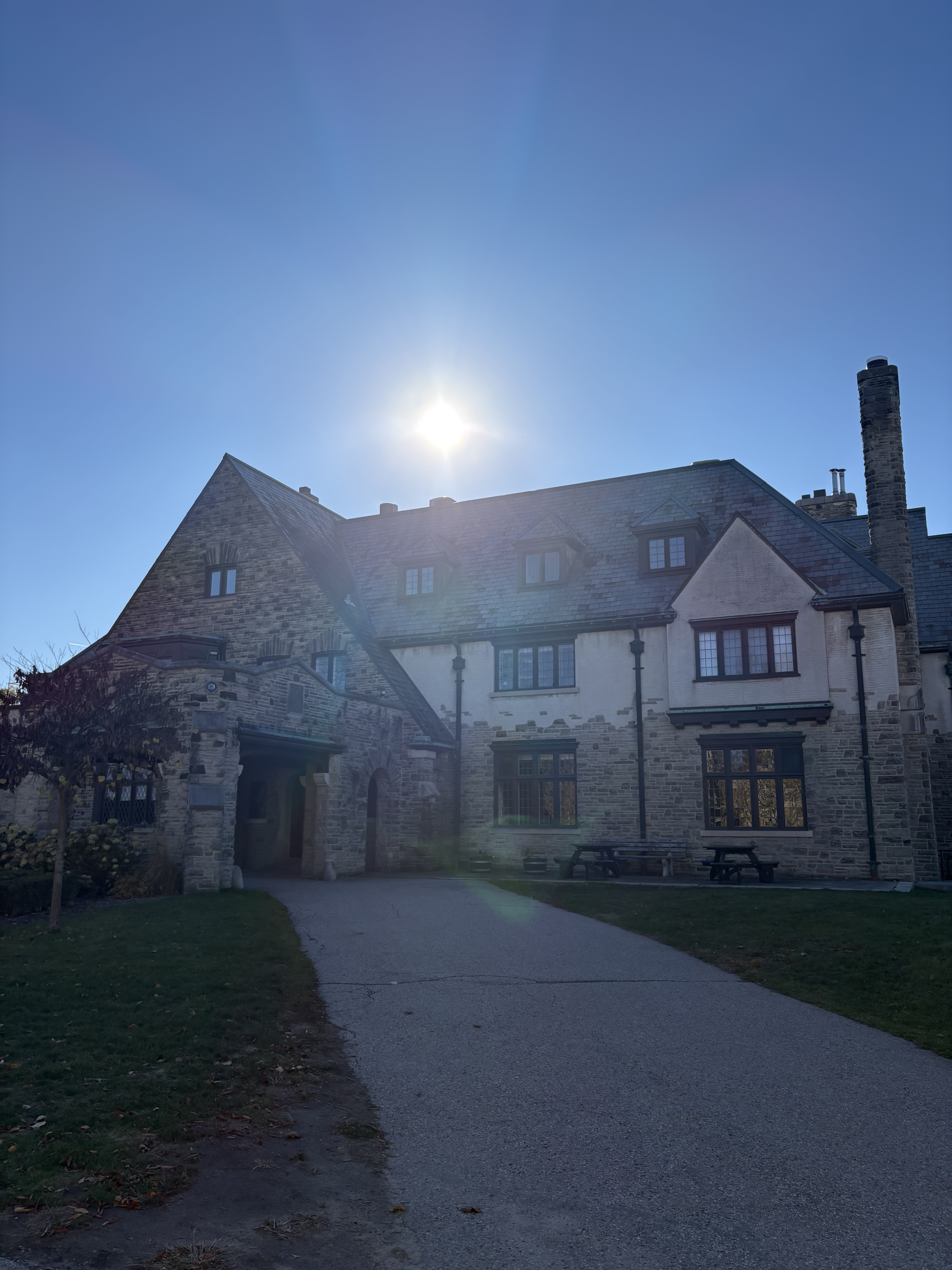
Dante Lenardon Hall, a Tudor Revival style building on King's University College campus, in London, Canada built in 1935.

=== South America ===
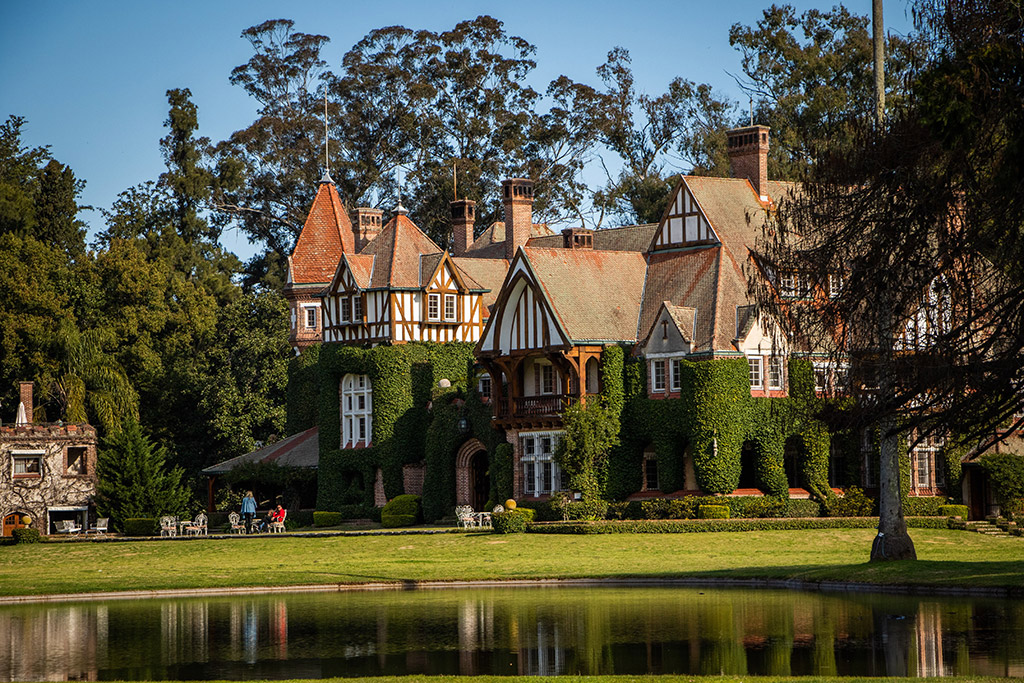
Estancia Villa Maria in Cañuelas Partido, Argentina

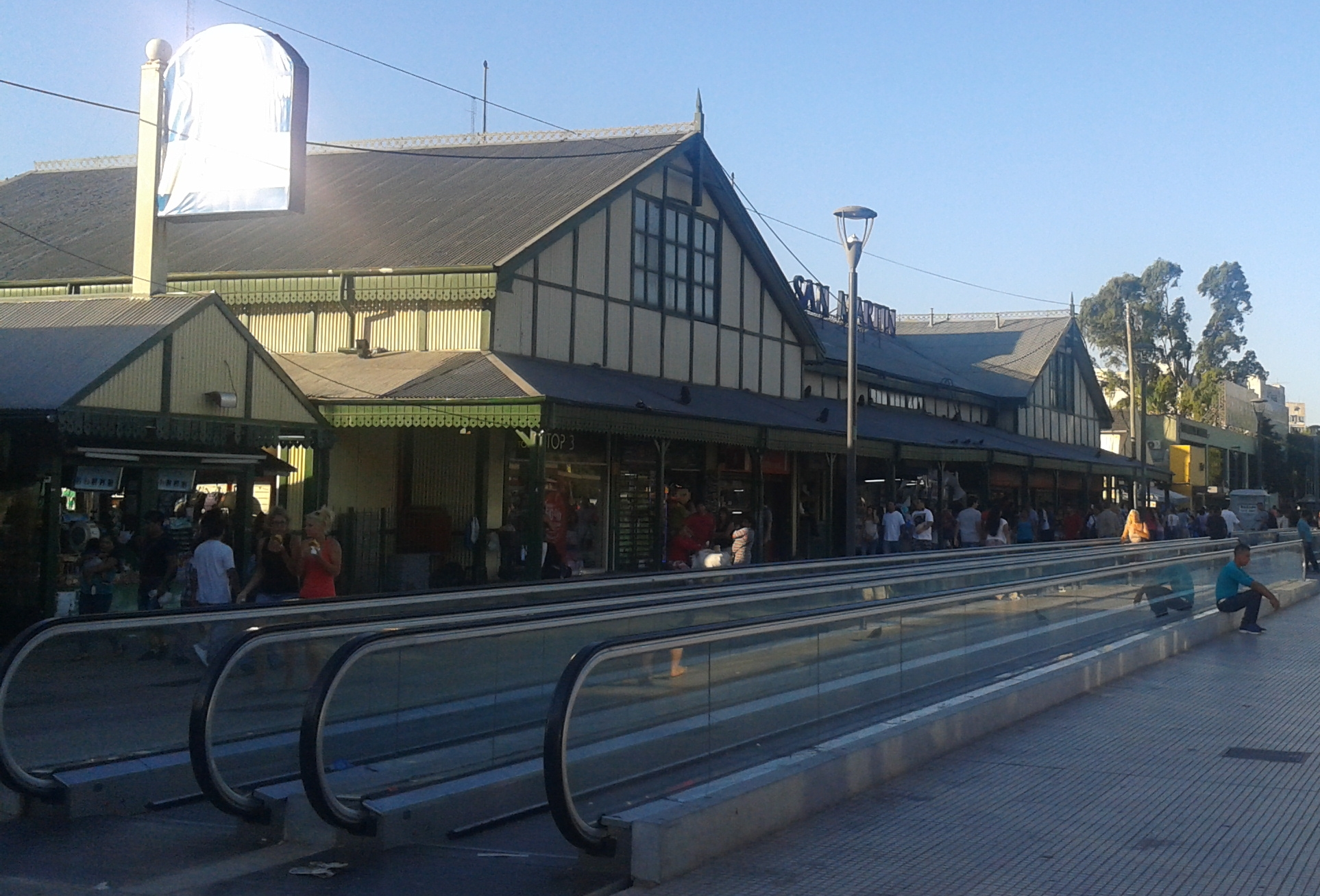
Retiro San Martín railway station in Buenos Aires, Argentina

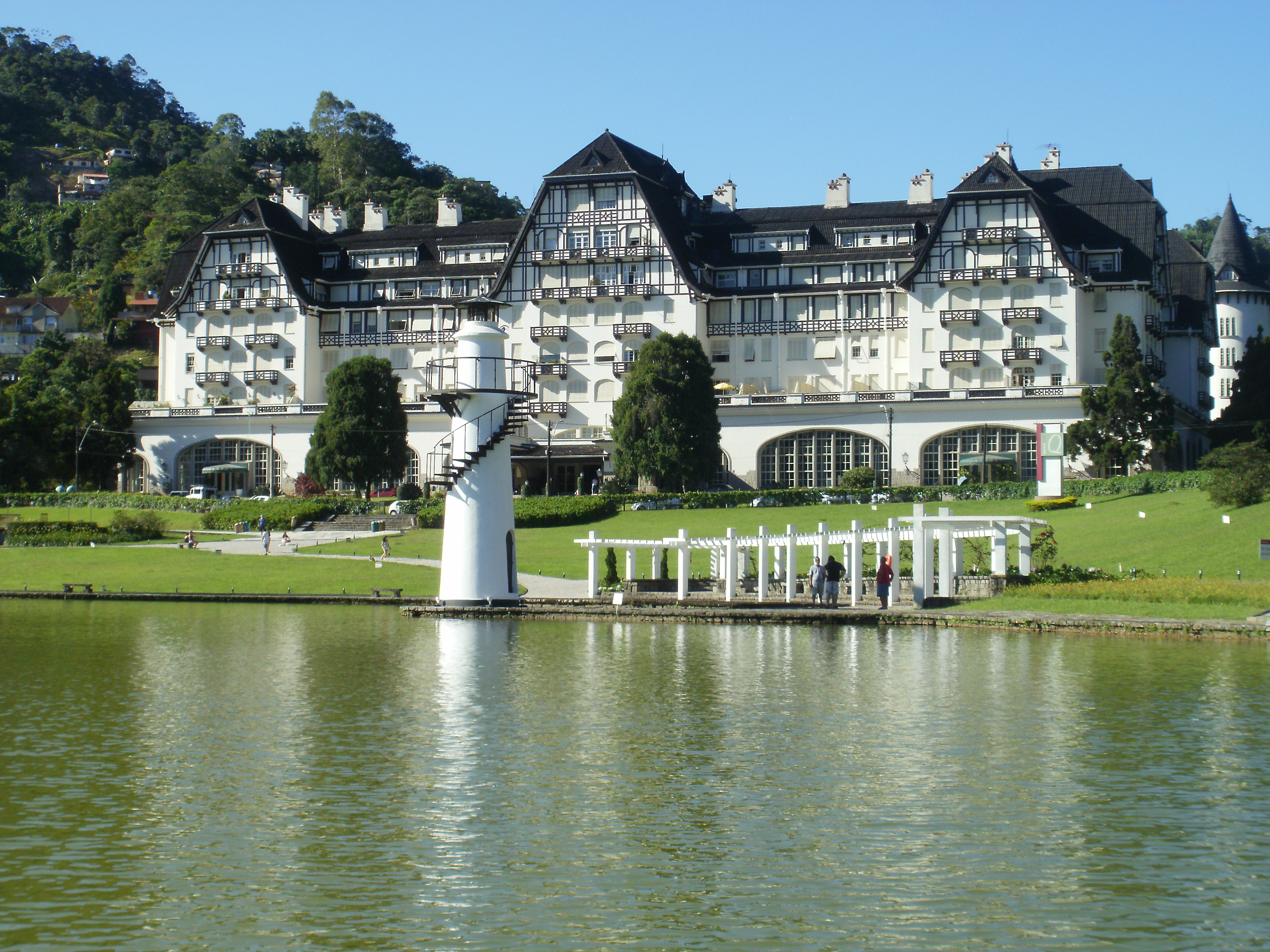
Palácio Quitandinha in Petrópolis, Brazil

=== Australia and New Zealand ===
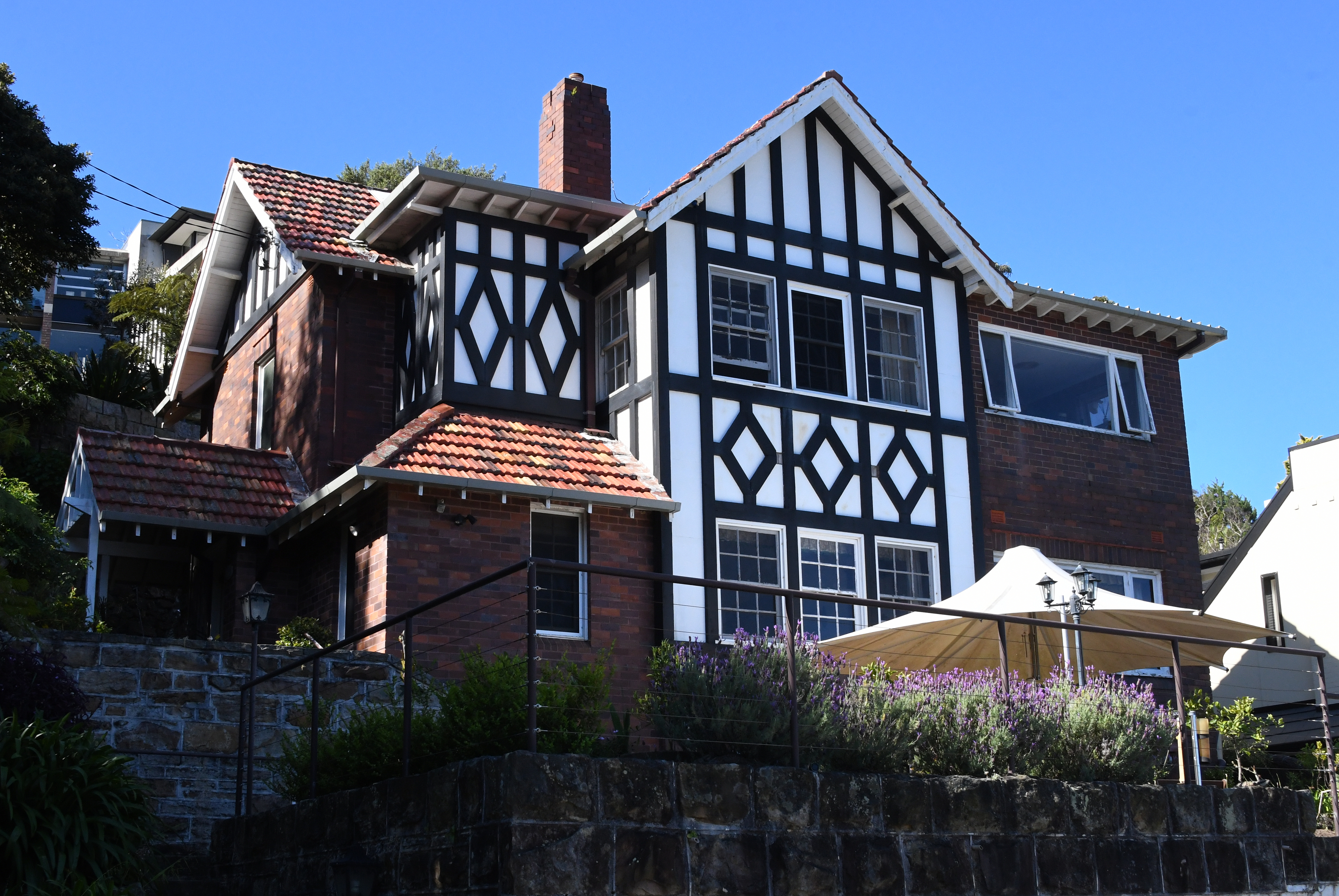
House in Mosman, New South Wales

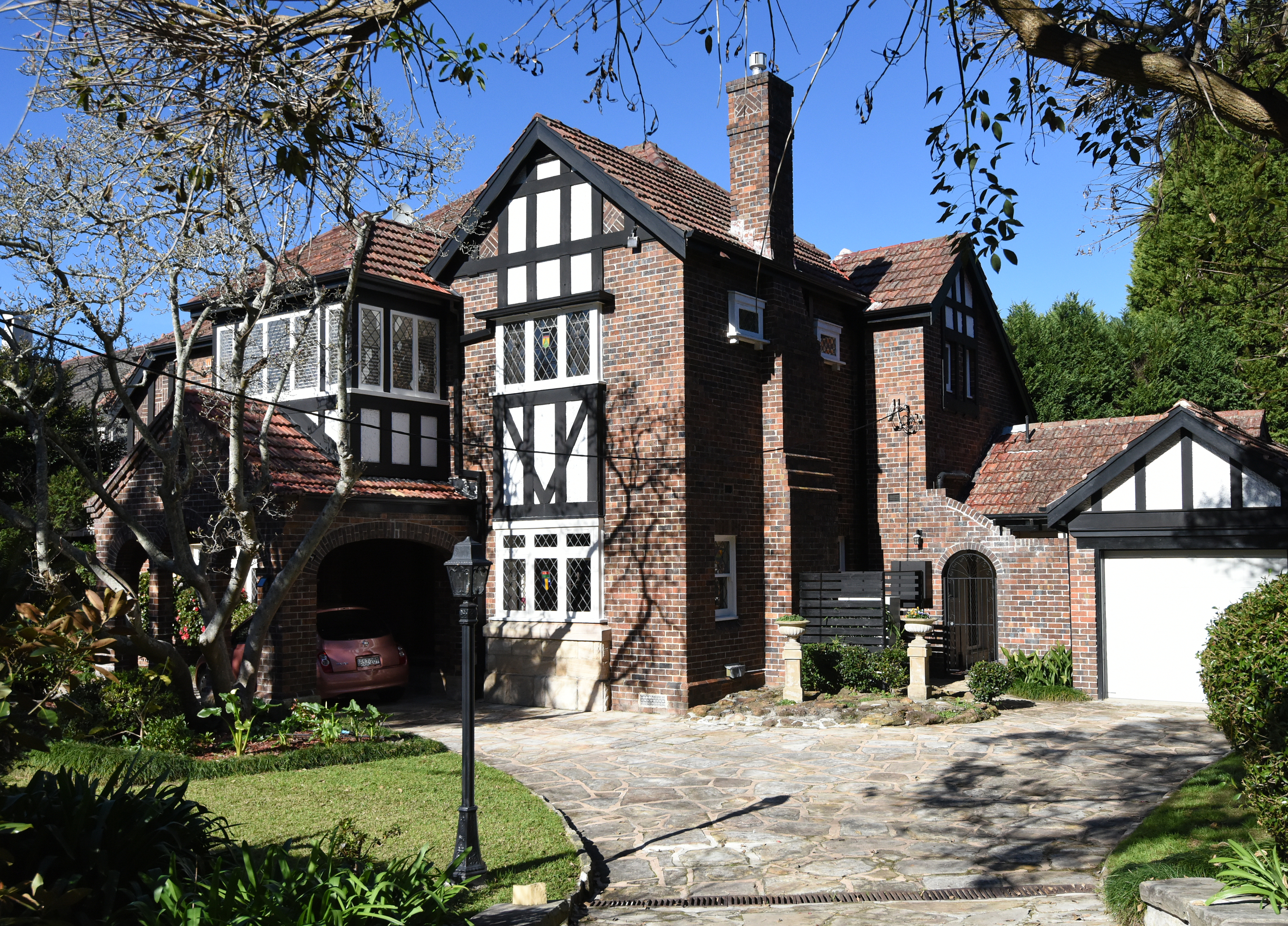
House in Killara, New South Wales

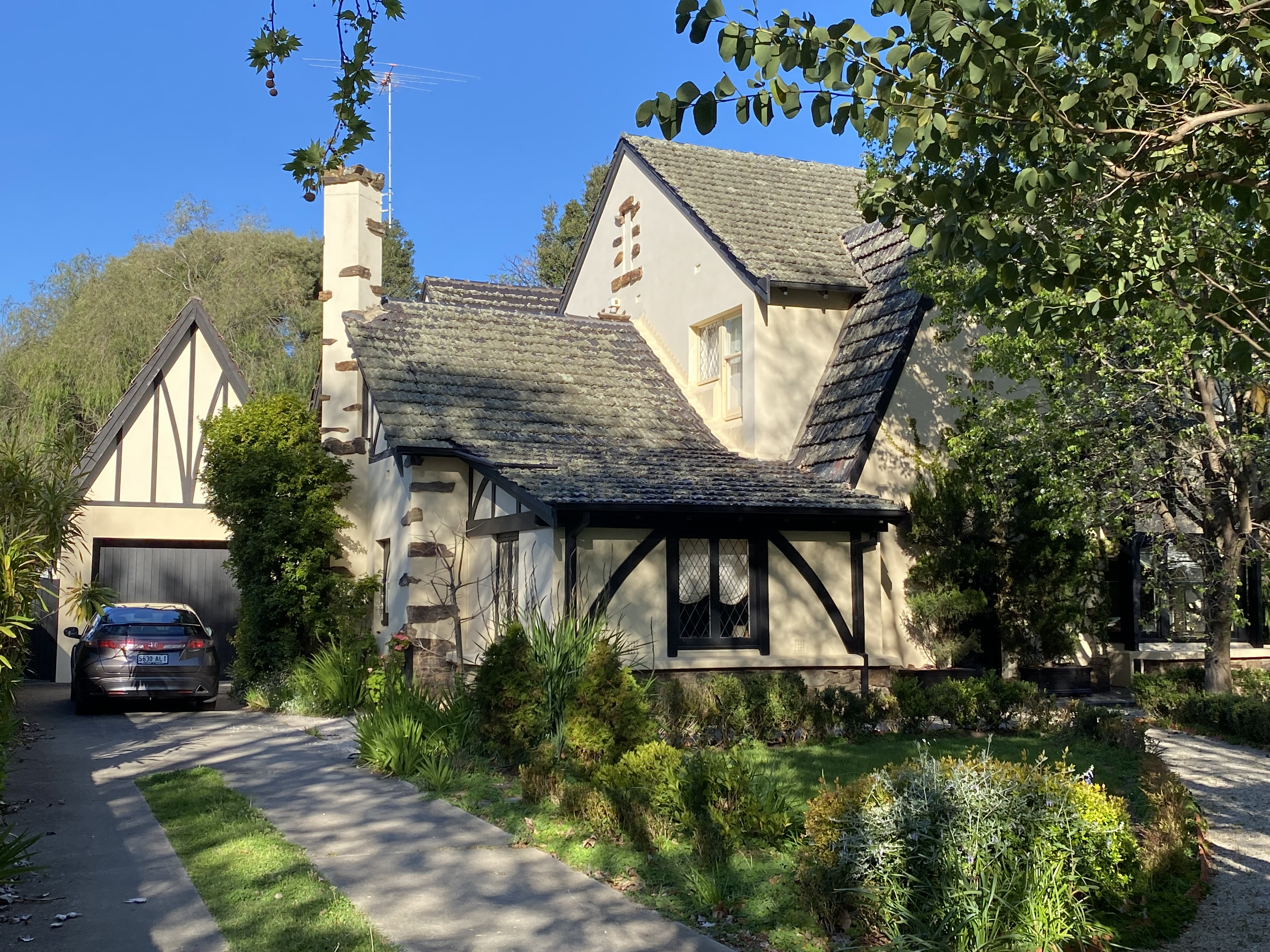
Tudor Revival house in Unley Park, South Australia

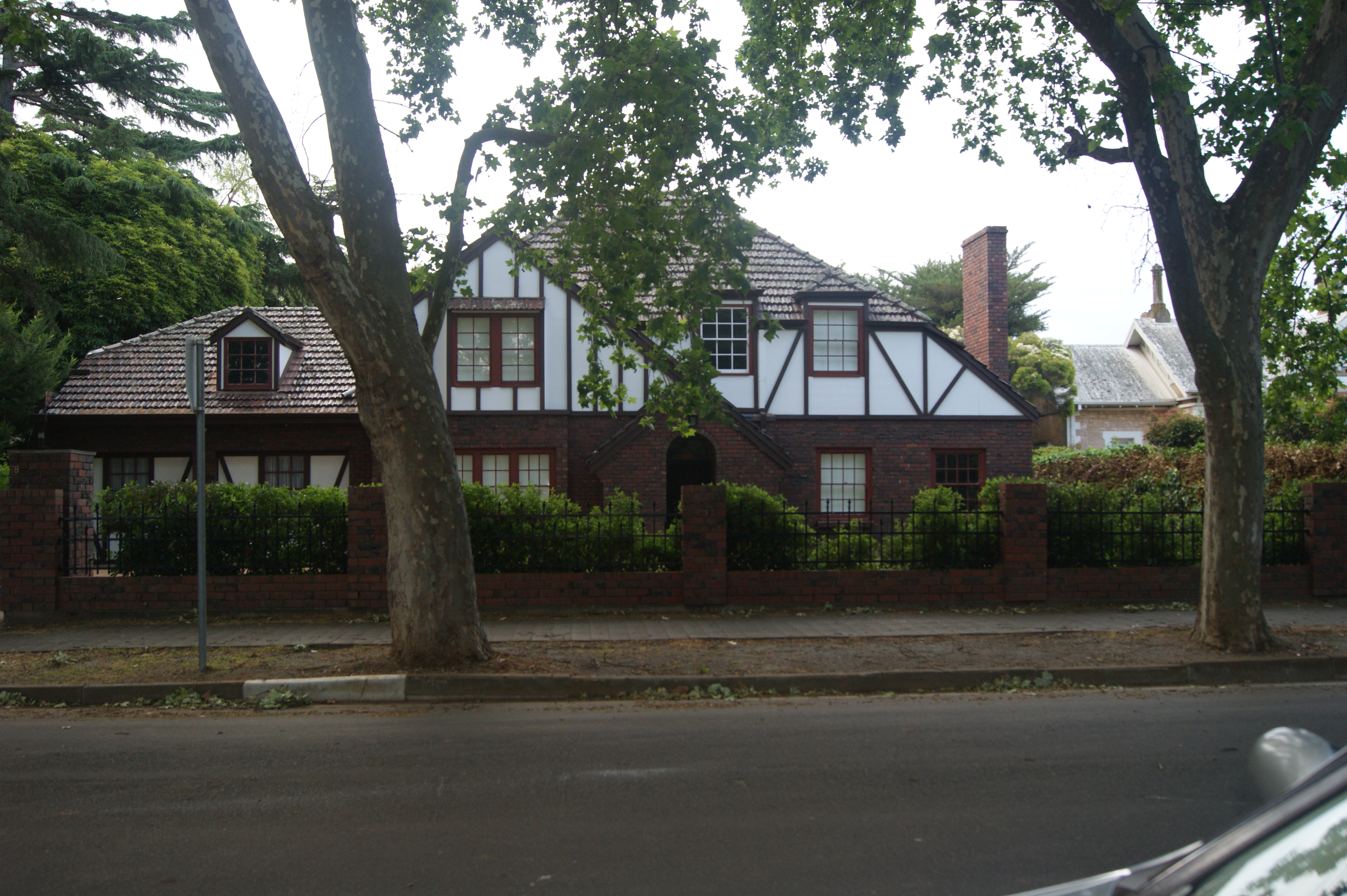
House in Adelaide, South Australia

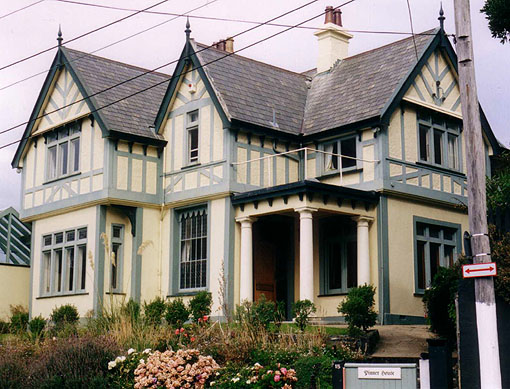
Pinner House, Dunedin, New Zealand

== General and cited references ==
- Airs, Malcolm (1995). The Tudor and Jacobean Country House: A Building History. Bridgend, Wales: Sutton Publishing. ISBN 978-0-75091-7889. OCLC 963827785.
- Allibone, Jill (1991). George Devey, Architect: 1820-1886. Cambridge: The Lutterworth Press. ISBN 978-0-71882-7854. OCLC 231443025.
- Aslet, Clive (1982). The Last Country Houses. New Haven and London: Yale University Press. ISBN 978-0-30003-4745.
- Aslet, Clive (2013). An Exuberant Catalogue of Dreams: The Americans Who Revived the Country House in Britain. London: Aurum Press. ISBN 978-1-78131-0946. OCLC 840477309.
- Aslet, Clive; Powers, Alan (1985). The National Trust Book of the English House. Penguin/Viking. ISBN 0670801755.
- Bradley, Simon; Pevsner, Nikolaus (2003). London 6: Westminster. The Buildings of England. New Haven and London: Yale University Press. ISBN 978-0-300-09595-1.
- Cook, Olive (1984). The English House Through Seven Centuries. Harmondsworth, Middlesex: Penguin Books. ISBN 978-0-14006-7385.
- Curl, James Stevens (1990). Victorian Architecture. Newton Abbot, UK: David & Charles. ISBN 978-0-7153-9144-0. OCLC 823781473.
- Davey, Peter (1995). Arts and Crafts Architecture. London: Phaidon Press. ISBN 978-07148-2874-9.
- Davis, Terence (1960). The Architecture of John Nash. London: Longacre Press Ltd. OCLC 559524050.
- Dean, Ptolemy, Architectural Britain, 2007. National Trust Books, ISBN 9781905400492
- Girouard, Mark (1979). The Victorian Country House. New Haven, US and London: Yale University Press. ISBN 978-0-30002-3909.
- Hall, Michael (1994). The English Country House: From the Archives of Country Life 1897–1939. London: Reed International Books. ISBN 978-1-85732-5300. OCLC 832426788.
- Hall, Michael (2009). The Victorian Country House. London, UK: Aurum Press. ISBN 978-1-84513-4570.
- Hussey, Christopher (1989) [1950]. The Life of Sir Edwin Lutyens. Woodbridge: Antique Collectors Club. ISBN 978-0-90746-2590.
- Jenkins, Simon (2003). England's Thousand Best Houses. London, UK: Penguin Books. ISBN 978-0-71399-5961.
- de Moubray, Amicia (2013). Twentieth Century Castles In Britain. London, UK: Frances Lincoln Publishers. ISBN 978-0-71123-1788.
- McWilliam, Colin (1978). Lothian. The Buildings of Scotland. Harmondsworth, UK: Penguin Books. ISBN 978-0-14071-0663. OCLC 669710509.
- Nairn, Ian; Pevsner, Nikolaus; Cherry, Bridget (1971). Surrey. The Buildings of England. Middlesex, England: Penguin Books. ISBN 0-300-09675-5.
- Pevsner, Nikolaus; Richmond, Ian (2002). Northumberland. The Buildings of England. New Haven, US and London: Yale University Press. ISBN 978-0-30009-6385.
- Pevsner, Nikolaus; Williamson, Elizabeth (2003). Buckinghamshire. The Buildings of England. New Haven, US and London: Yale University Press. ISBN 978-0-30009-5845. OCLC 835201226.
- Physick, John; Darby, Michael (1973). Marble Halls - Drawings and Models of Victorian Secular Buildings. Margate, Kent: Eyre and Spottiswoode Ltd. ISBN 978-0-90148-6684.
- Quiney, Anthony (1990). The Traditional Buildings of England. London: Thames and Hudson. ISBN 978-0-50034-1100. OCLC 473283902.
- Robinson, John Martin, Ascott, 2008, Scala Publishers Ltd, ISBN 1857595041
- Ryan, Deborah Sugg (2018). Ideal homes, 1918-39: Domestic design and suburban modernism. Manchester, UK: Manchester University Press. ISBN 978-0-71906-8850.
- Saint, Andrew (2010). Richard Norman Shaw. New Haven, US and London: Yale University Press. ISBN 978-0-30015-5266.
- Sherwood, Jennifer; Pevsner, Nikolaus (1996). Oxfordshire. The Buildings of England. New Haven, US and London: Yale University Press. ISBN 978-0-30009-6392.
- Summerson, John, Architecture in Britain, 1530-1830, 1991 (8th edn., revised), Penguin, Pelican history of art, ISBN 0140560033
- Turnor, Reginald (1950). Nineteenth Century Architecture in Britain. London, UK: Batsford. OCLC 520344.
- Tinniswood, Adrian (2016). The Long Weekend: Life in the English Country House Between the Wars. London: Jonathan Cape. ISBN 978-1-448-19124-6. OCLC 951261677.
