= Amyas Phillips =

- Born: 1891; Hitchin, Hertfordshire
- Died: Feb 1962 (aged 70); Clophill, Bedfordshire
- Years active: 1910 - 1962 (antique dealer)
- Notable work: Bailiffscourt (architect)
- Spouse: Mary Olwen Wade-Evan (married 1931)
- Children: Francis Jerome Phillips
- Father: Frederick William Phillips
- Relatives: Hugh Phillips (brother)

Amyas Phillips (1891-1962) was an English antique dealer and architect based in Hitchin, Hertfordshire. Amyas operated Phillips of Hitchin antique dealers (previously known as F. W. Phillips, and later H. & A. Phillips) for much of his life.

== Early life ==
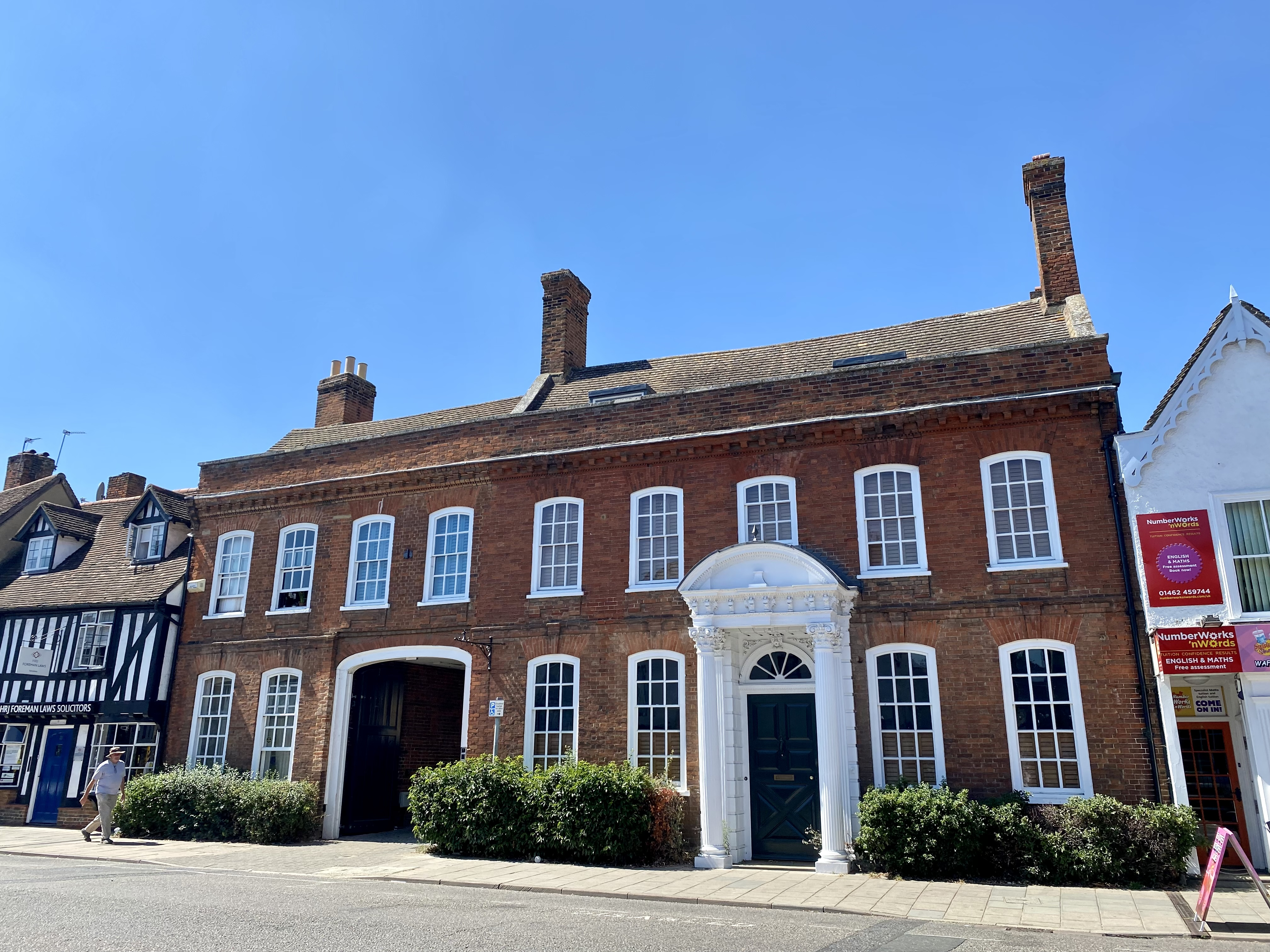
The Manor Galleries in Hitchin

Amyas was born in 1891 in Hitchin, Hertfordshire to Frederick W. Phillips (1856-1910) and Margaret Sturrock Cable (who died in 1937). His father, Frederick W. Phillips, founded the antique dealership F. W. Phillips in 1884 which operated out of The Manor House in Hitchin, a Grade II* listed Georgian house. Amyas read at Oxford University, and soon took over F. W. Phillips with his elder brother Hugh Phillips (1886-1972) following the death of their father in 1910.

== Career ==
Soon after Amyas and his elder brother took over the dealership they changed the name from F. W. Phillips to H. & A. Phillips. Amyas went on a business trip to New York early on in his antiques career in 1920, and met many notable interior decorators and antique dealers of the period, like Arthur Stannard Vernay. He also visited the Paul Revere House in Boston, a 17th century colonial home belonging to American Patriot Paul Revere, and later reproduced the wallpaper in his own home in Bedfordshire. H. & A. Phillips were well known for reproducing interior decorations, as well as being hired to furnish properties.

An early major project undertaken by Hugh and Amyas was the dismantling of 35 St Martin's Street in Westminster (currently the site of Westminster Reference Library), which was the residence of Isaac Newton from 1710 to 1725. The original intention was to re-build Newton's house elsewhere but this never occurred. A room from Newton's house was eventually reconstructed in the 1930s in The Manor House in Hitchin, with the panelling and mantelpiece later being sold to Babson College. H. & A. Phillips would regularly display their antique furniture and interior decorations 'in situ' in The Manor House, creating period settings that customers could recreate if they purchased their antiques.

After his brother retired from the antique dealership in 1935, Amyas and his wife Mary took over the business. They renamed the business Phillips of Hitchin, the name which it continued to operate under until its closure in 2014, when Amyas' son Jerome retired. Phillips of Hitchin has sold antiques to many well-known collectors, including Irwin Untermyer and Henry Ford II, and many museums like The Metropolitan Museum of Art, The Victoria & Albert Museum, The National Gallery of Victoria and Temple Newsam House.

== Architecture ==
Due to the interest in 'period style' furnishings in the early 20th century, some antique dealerships, including Phillips of Hitchin, started to focus more on older English furniture like that of the Tudor period. At Phillips of Hitchin, this focus also extended to furnishing and architecture, with customers requesting them to furnish their houses in period styles or build them new 'ancient' houses with recycled historic building materials.

In the 1920s, Amyas showed Allethaire Ludlow Crummer, who was married to Samuel P. Rotan (then the District Attorney of Philadelphia), around different English country houses. Crummer was looking to replicate a country house in the United States as her own place of residence and she chose Sutton Place, a Tudor manor house in Guildford built by Sir Richard Weston, to be reproduced. Robert Rodes McGoodwin was the architect for this house, entitled "Lane's End" (now the Guildford Estate) in Wyndmoor, Pennsylvania. Amyas was originally chosen to build "Lane's End", however he likely sent historical building material (from demolished English houses) to be used in the construction.

Phillips of Hitchin also undertook restoration work, including the restoration of Prior Castell's Clock at Durham Cathedral in the 1930s, which was funded by the Friends of Durham Cathedral.

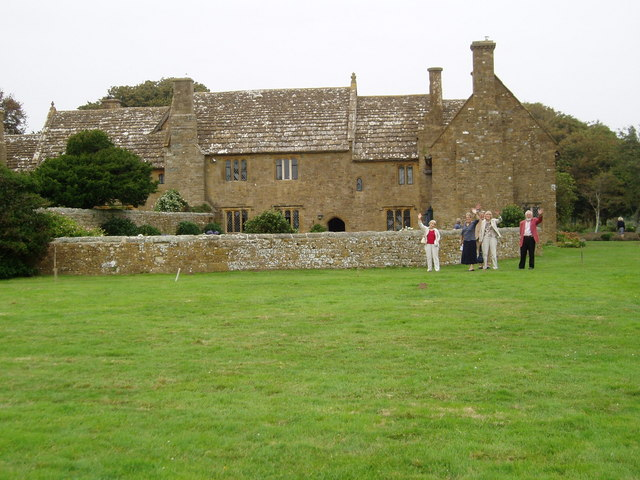
Bailiffscourt in 2008

=== Bailiffscourt ===
Bailiffscourt is a Grade II* listed 'ancient' manor house in Climping, West Sussex which currently operates as a hotel and spa. Lord Moyne had purchased the Bailiffscourt estate in 1927 and commissioned Amyas to build a new house. Bailiffscourt was Amyas' only full architectural commission, and was completed in 1935. Bailiffscourt was built in a Medieval style, while also taking inspiration from Cotswold houses, and used primarily material salvaged from demolished historical stone houses. The only remaining property on the estate prior to Lord Moyne's purchase was Bailiffscourt Chapel (and a moat), so he was inspired to continue the historic 'atmosphere' of the property.

== Personal life ==
In 1931, Amyas married Mary Olwen Wade-Evans in Wandsworth, London. Their son, Francis Jerome Phillips, was born in 1939 in Cambridge and took over the family business following Amyas' death in February 1962 in Clophill, Bedfordshire.
