= Bailiffscourt Chapel =

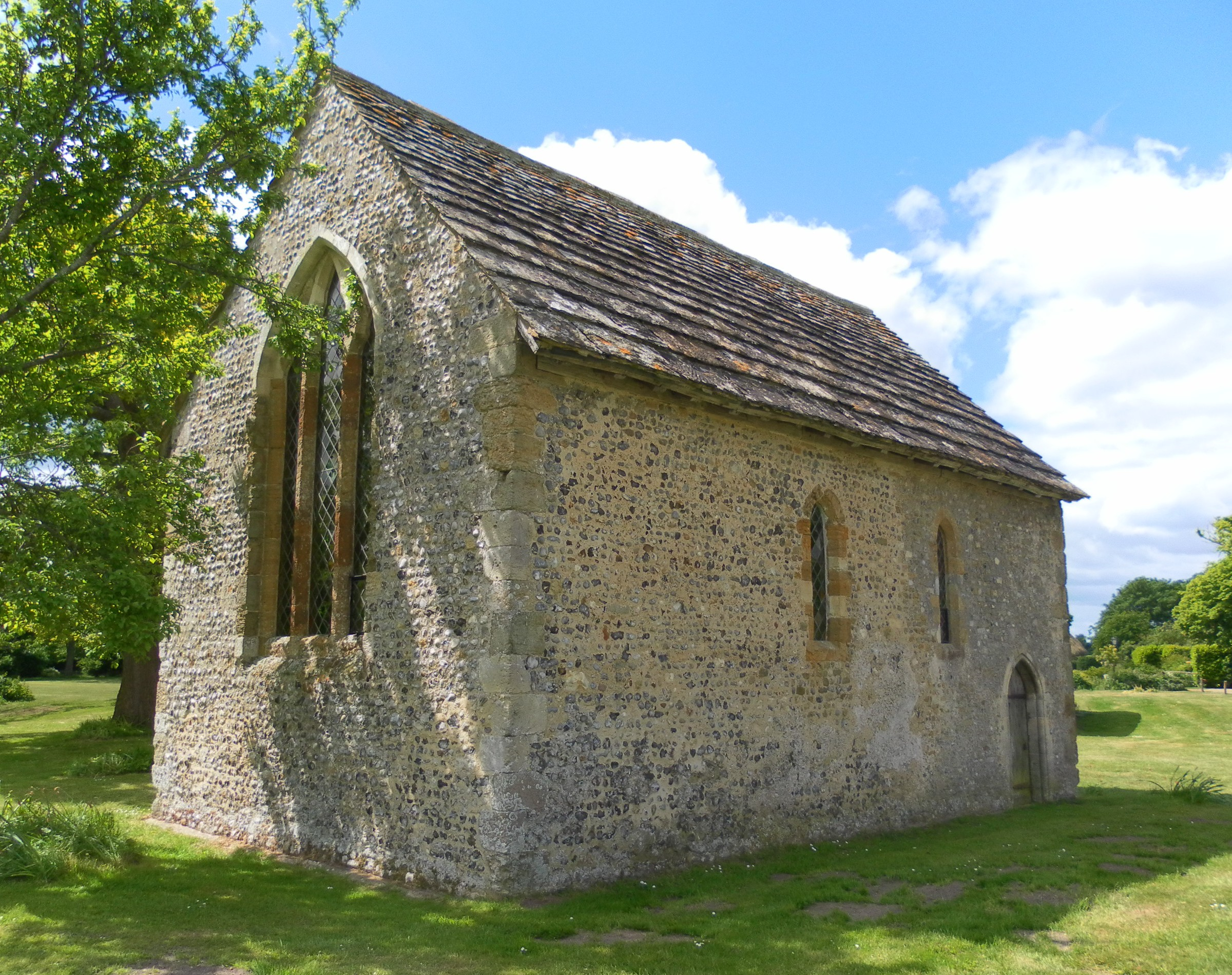
- The chapel from the southwest
- Bailiffscourt Chapel
- 50.7990°N 0.5793°W
- Location: Bailiffscourt Hotel, Climping Street, Atherington, Clymping, West Sussex BN17 5RW
- Country: England
- Denomination: Pre-Reformation church

History
- Status: Private chapel
- Founded: 11th century
- Events: 1952: Recorded as being in use as a chapel of ease for parishioners in Climping parish

Architecture
- Functional status: Deconsecrated
- Heritage designation: Grade II*
- Designated: 5 June 1958
- Style: Gothic

Bailiffscourt Chapel is a deconsecrated chapel in the grounds of Bailiffscourt Hotel, a luxury hotel near the hamlet of Atherington in West Sussex, England. Originally associated with the Norman Abbey of Séez, it was founded in the 11th century and rebuilt in its present simple Gothic form in the 13th century. It later fell out of use, but after Atherington's former church was destroyed by coastal erosion it was used again for public worship for a time—and as late as 1952 the building was again in use as a chapel of ease. Situated outside Bailiffscourt—a mock-medieval mansion built in 1935 by Lord Moyne on the site of an ancient manor house—on the only stretch of open seafront land for miles in each direction, the chapel is now used principally for wedding and civil ceremony blessings. English Heritage has listed it at Grade II* for its architectural and historical importance.

== History ==
The parish of Climping, sometimes spelt Clymping, covers a large coastal area next to the English Channel and the River Arun in West Sussex. The land, a combination of silty brickearth and alluvium, is prone to erosion, and large parts of the parish have been lost to the sea since the Middle Ages. The former villages of Ilsham, Cudlow and Atherington are now depopulated, their former churches have been destroyed, and their parishes combined with Clymping.

The manor of Atherington existed at the time of the Domesday survey in 1086, by which time it was held by the Abbey of Séez in Normandy. The name later became Bailiffscourt because the manor was used by the bailiff who administered the abbey's landholdings in England. The land on which the manor stood was an exclave of Littlehampton parish until the 19th century, but much of its associated estate was in Climping parish. The original manor house was built in the 11th century and originally had a chapel attached to it.

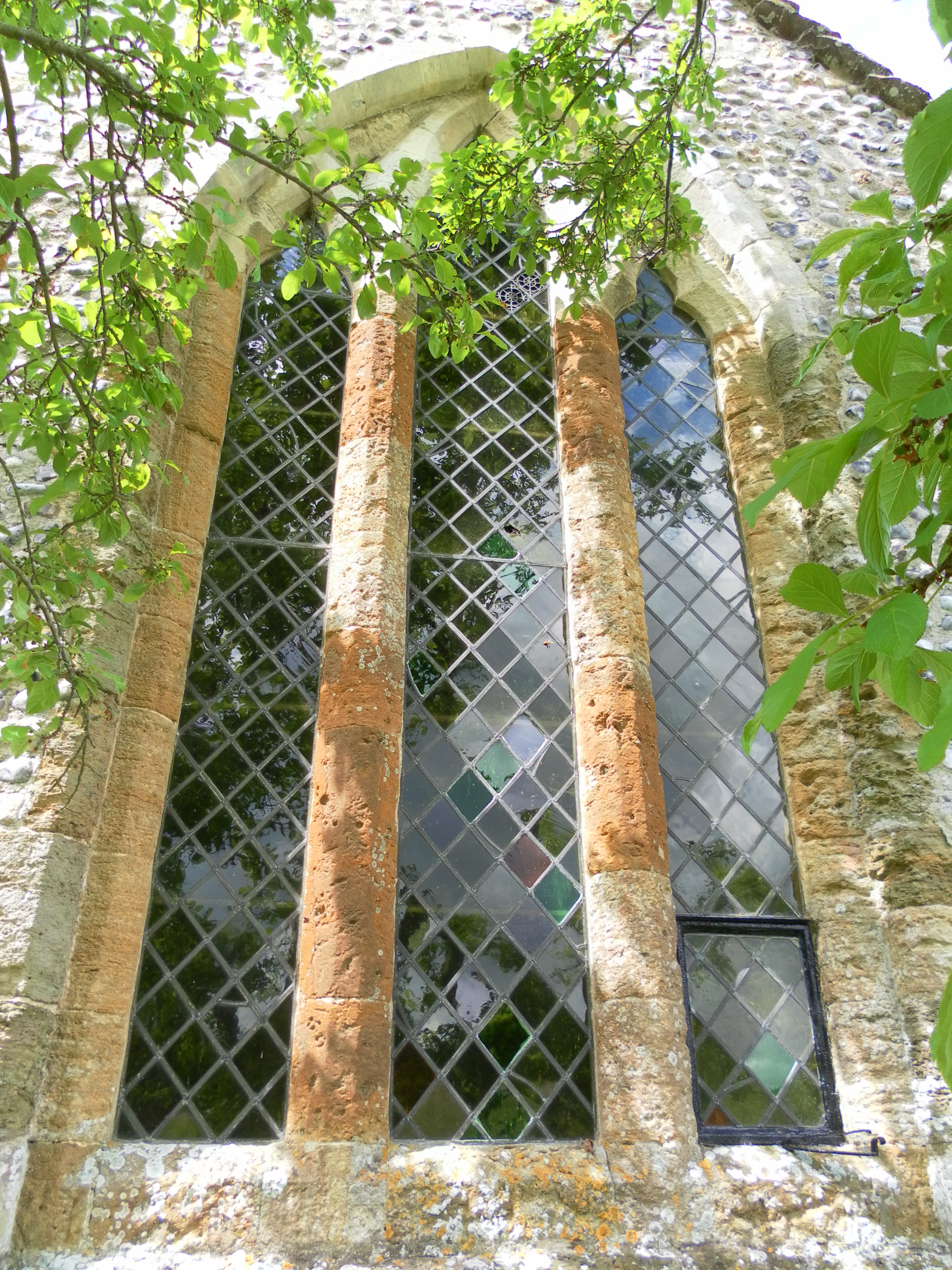
The chapel has a large three-light east window.

The chapel was rebuilt in the late 13th century using stones and rubble from the original building. It stood at the south end of the main (east–west) wing of the L-shaped manor house, and may have been freestanding rather than attached to the house. Bailiffscourt Manor was subjected to rebuilding and remodelling several times, and the role of the chapel changed: by 1728 it may have been used as accommodation for servants, and it was later used as a dairy and a storage shed. Before this, though, it was apparently used as a "hamlet chapel" by the remaining villagers of Atherington, whose original church had been destroyed by the sea in the late 17th century along with most of its houses.

In 1927, Lord Moyne bought Bailiffscourt Manor and its whole estate, thereby becoming a major landowner. Of the old buildings, only the chapel was retained, and between 1928 and 1935 the architect Amyas Phillips built a new manor house in a faithful interpretation of the 15th-century style. Ancient buildings were transported from other sites in Sussex and elsewhere and rebuilt in the grounds surrounding the chapel. Lord Moyne turned much of the land surrounding the manor house into parkland, which now forms by far the largest stretch of non-urbanised land on the coast between Brighton and Bognor Regis.

The manor and chapel were moved into Climping parish in the 19th century and ceased being an exclave of Littlehampton, although it was still part of its ecclesiastical parish until the 20th century. In 1952, the chapel came back into religious use briefly as a chapel of ease to St Mary's Church, Climping: some services were held there on summer evenings. In 1948, Bailiffscourt House became a luxury hotel, now owned by HS Hotels (Historic Sussex Hotels) and operated under the name Bailiffscourt Hotel and Spa. The chapel is now used for the blessing of weddings and civil ceremonies that take place at the hotel.

Bailiffscourt Chapel was listed at Grade II* by English Heritage on 5 June 1958. This defines it as a "particularly important" building of "more than special interest". As of February 2001, it was one of 24 Grade II* listed buildings, and 960 listed buildings of all grades, in the district of Arun.

== Architecture ==
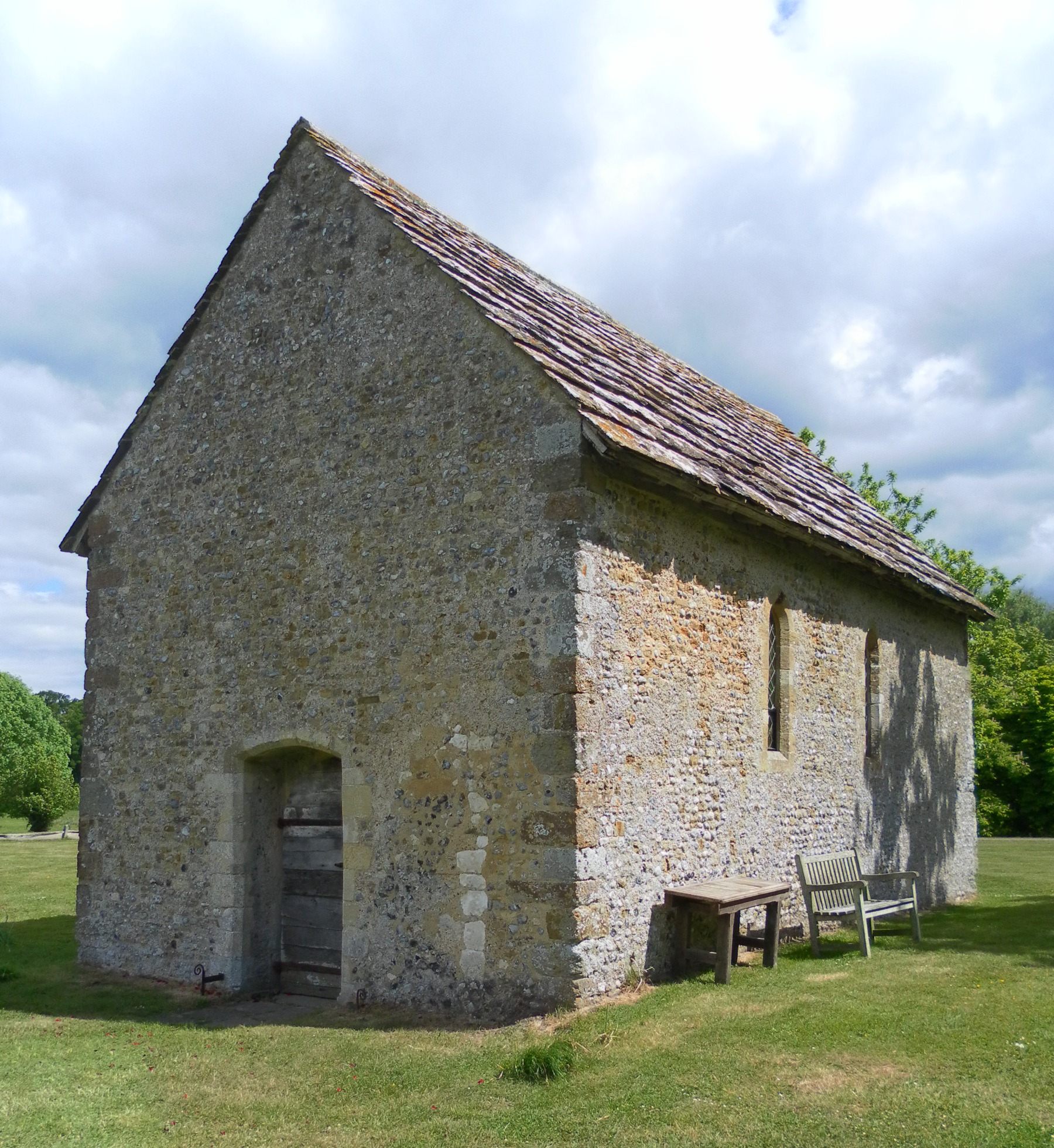
The simple chapel has lancet windows in the side walls.

The chapel is a simple Gothic building of the 13th century. The single-cell rectangular structure is dominated by a large three-light east window in the form of a lancet with cusping. Smaller single-light lancets remain in the north and south walls. The exterior is built of flint, rough stones and cobbles, some of which came from the original 11th-century chapel, and the sloping roof is laid with tiles. Inside, there are arches whose capitals are carved with foliage decoration and a mass dial dating from the medieval era. This was found on the beach nearby, and had apparently washed up from the submerged remains of the old church at Atherington. The ashes of Lord Moyne and his wife Lady Evelyn were originally interred in the chapel, but they are now in a tomb in St Mary's Church, Climping.

== See also ==
- List of places of worship in Arun

== Notes ==
=== Bibliography ===
- Nairn, Ian; Pevsner, Nikolaus (1965). The Buildings of England: Sussex. Harmondsworth: Penguin Books. ISBN 0-14-071028-0.
- Vincent, Alex (2005). The Lost Churches and Chapels of Sussex. Seaford: S.B. Publications. ISBN 1-85770-303-0.
