= Estancia Villa Maria =

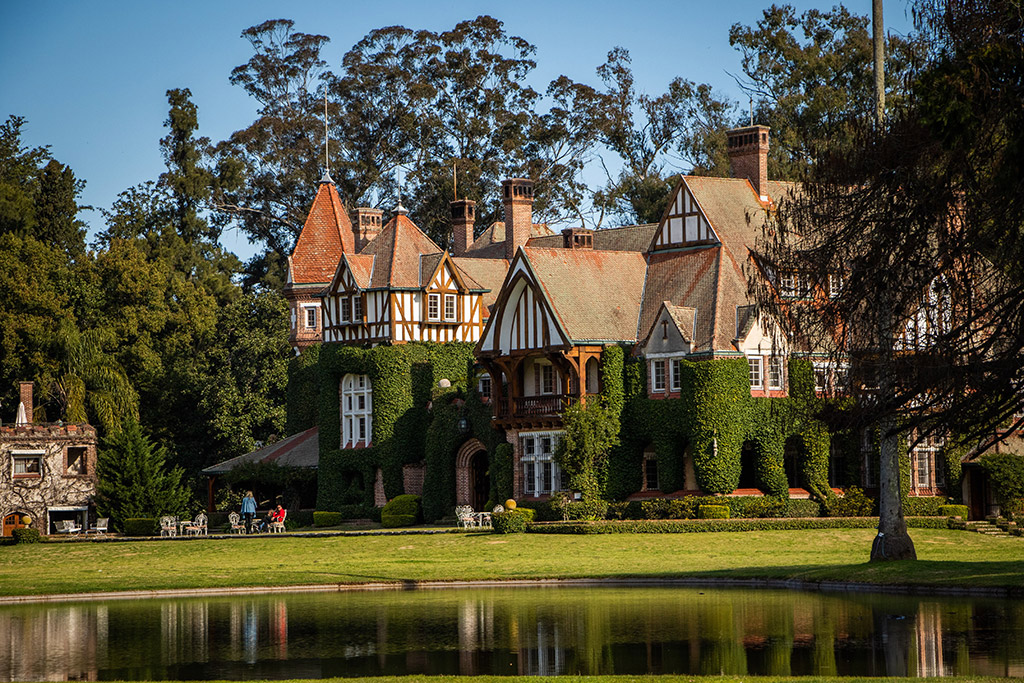
- Estancia Villa Maria in 2018
- Click on the map for a fullscreen view

General information
- Location: Máximo Paz, Argentina
- Coordinates: 34°58′08.1″S 58°35′07.1″W

Estancia Villa Maria is a historic country estate located in Máximo Paz, in the Cañuelas Partido, near Buenos Aires, Argentina.

== History ==
The estate, which was born as a livestock farming estate, was bought by Vicente Pereda in 1895. In 1919, his son, Caledonio Pereda, commissioned architect Alejandro Bustillo to design a new main manor house to serve as the family's summer residence. Construction took place between 1923 and 1927.

For decades, the residence hosted family and high society events. In the 1990s, the then-owner, Eleonora Nazar Anchorena, a member of a prominent ranching family, decided to transform the estate by abandoning livestock production in favour of tourism, opening the property to the public as a hotel and polo club. Over the years, the villa has also become a sought-after venue for weddings and special events, hosting celebrities such as Michael Bublé and Luisana Lopilato, and Araceli González. It also served as a filming location for the 2016 Argentinian telenovela Los ricos no piden permiso.

== Description ==
The estancia's principal manor house is an outstanding example of Tudor-Norman architecture and encompasses more than 3,000 square meters. It is set within a 74-hectare landscaped park designed in 1917 by the landscape architect Benito Carrasco, a disciple of Carlos Thays. The park contains more than 300 species of trees and plants, as well as artificial lakes and ponds. The estate as a whole extends across more than 600 hectares of rural landscape.
