= Arun District Council elections =

Local government elections in West Sussex, England

Arun District Council in West Sussex, England is elected every four years. Since the last boundary changes in 2015, 54 councillors have been elected from 23 wards.

== Council composition ==
Composition of the council
Year	Conservative	Liberal Democrats (Note: Includes totals for the predecessors of the Liberal Democrats, the Liberal Party and SDP (both of which participated in the Alliance).)	Labour	Green	UKIP	Independents & Others	Council control after election
Local government reorganisation; council established (60 seats)
1973	39	4	4	–	–	13	Conservative
1976	50	5	1	0	–	4	Conservative
1979	50	9	1	0	–	0	Conservative
New ward boundaries (56 seats)
1983	51	4	1	0	–	0	Conservative
1987	51	4	1	0	–	0	Conservative
1991	36	11	7	0	–	2	Conservative
1995	29	14	10	0	0	3	Conservative
1999	36	10	8	0	0	2	Conservative
New ward boundaries (56 seats)
2003	36	11	8	0	0	1	Conservative
2007	42	9	3	0	0	2	Conservative
2011	48	4	3	0	0	2	Conservative
New ward boundaries (54 seats)
2015	42	5	1	0	4	2	Conservative
2019	21	22	1	2	0	8	No overall control
2023	20	14	8	6	0	6	No overall control

== District result maps ==
2003 results map

2007 results map

2011 results map

2015 results map

2019 results map

2023 results map

== By-election results ==
=== Overview ===
By-election	Date	Incumbent party	Result
Rustington South	26 March 1998	Conservative	Conservative
Felpham	3 December 1998	Independent	Conservative
Rustington South	15 July 1999	Conservative	Conservative
Hotham	27 July 2000	Conservative	Conservative
Yapton	5 May 2005	Conservative	Liberal Democrats
Felpham East	22 September 2005	Conservative	Conservative
Angmering	10 November 2005	Conservative	Conservative
Rustington West	20 April 2006	Conservative	Conservative
Angmering	1 June 2006	Conservative	Conservative
Yapton	1 June 2006	Liberal Democrats	Conservative
Yapton	20 March 2008	Conservative	Conservative
Felpham West	2 April 2009	Conservative	Conservative
Aldwick East	14 March 2013	Conservative	Liberal Democrats
Angmering	18 April 2013	Conservative	Conservative
Aldwick West	2 November 2017	Conservative	Liberal Democrats
Marine	22 February 2018	Conservative	Liberal Democrats
Brookfield	6 May 2021	Liberal Democrats	Conservative
Pevensey	6 May 2021	Liberal Democrats	Conservative
Barnham	8 September 2022	Conservative	Green
Arundel and Walberton	1 December 2022	Green	Green
Marine	24 April 2025	Independent	Reform

=== 1995-1999 ===
Rustington South By-Election 26 March 1998
Party	Candidate	Votes	%	±%
Conservative		594	60.4	
Liberal Democrats		374	38.6	
Majority		220	22.8	
Turnout		968	31.0	
Conservative hold		Swing		

Felpham By-Election 3 December 1998
Party	Candidate	Votes	%	±%
Conservative		393	40.1	+9.6
Independent		294	30.0	+8.8
Liberal Democrats		167	17.0	+9.4
Independent		102	10.4	+10.4
Labour		24	2.5	−6.4
Majority		99	10.1	
Turnout		980	27.4	
Conservative gain from Independent		Swing		

=== 1999-2003 ===
Rustington South By-Election 15 July 1999
Party	Candidate	Votes	%	±%
Conservative	Florence Harrison	604	64.1	
Liberal Democrats	Richard James	208	22.1	
Labour	Moira Rice	130	13.8	
Majority		396	42.0	
Turnout		942	30.0	
Conservative hold		Swing		

Hotham By-Election 27 July 2000
Party	Candidate	Votes	%	±%
Conservative	Andrew Evans	429	38.7	−2.7
Labour	Pauline Nash	388	35.0	+5.6
Liberal Democrats	Sylvia Olliver	292	26.3	−3.0
Majority		41	3.7	
Turnout		1,109	24.4	
Conservative hold		Swing		

=== 2003-2007 ===
Yapton By-Election 5 May 2005
Party	Candidate	Votes	%	±%
Liberal Democrats	Ian Menzies	1,213	50.7	+24.3
Conservative	Richard Taft	1,179	49.3	−24.3
Majority		34	1.4	
Turnout		2,392	60.5	
Liberal Democrats gain from Conservative		Swing		

Felpham East By-Election 22 September 2005
Party	Candidate	Votes	%	±%
Conservative	Paul English	492	58.2	+9.3
Liberal Democrats	Michael Harvey	267	31.6	+31.6
Labour	Simon Holland	86	10.2	−1.6
Majority		225	26.6	
Turnout		845	22.6	
Conservative hold		Swing		

Angmering By-Election 10 November 2005
Party	Candidate	Votes	%	±%
Conservative	Paul Bicknell	846	66.8	+3.4
Liberal Democrats	Trevor Richards	421	33.2	−3.4
Majority		425	33.6	
Turnout		1,267	22.8	
Conservative hold		Swing		

Rustington West By-Election 20 April 2006
Party	Candidate	Votes	%	±%
Conservative	Florence Harrison	769	44.1	+1.8
Liberal Democrats	Andrew Lauretani	581	33.4	+3.0
UKIP		277	15.9	−2.1
Labour		115	6.6	−2.7
Majority		188	10.7	
Turnout		1,742	26.8	
Conservative hold		Swing		

Angmering By-Election 1 June 2006
Party	Candidate	Votes	%	±%
Conservative	Dudley Wensley	1,052	73.6	+6.8
Liberal Democrats	Trevor Richards	254	17.8	−15.4
Labour		123	8.6	+8.6
Majority		798	55.8	+22.2
Turnout		1,429	24.7	+1.9
Conservative hold		Swing		

Yapton By-Election 1 June 2006
Party	Candidate	Votes	%	±%
Conservative	Michael Taft	699	70.5	+21.2
Liberal Democrats	Roslyn Kissell	205	20.7	−30.0
Labour		87	8.8	+8.8
Majority		494	49.8	
Turnout		991	24.0	−36.5
Conservative gain from Liberal Democrats		Swing		

=== 2007-2011 ===
Yapton by-election 20 March 2008
Party	Candidate	Votes	%	±%
Conservative	Emma Neno	620	59.8	−4.8
Liberal Democrats	David Jones	212	20.4	−2.4
BNP	Albert Bodle	205	19.8	+19.8
Majority		408	39.4	
Turnout		1,037	25.4	
Conservative hold		Swing	-1.2	

Felpham West by-election 2 April 2009
Party	Candidate	Votes	%	±%
Conservative	Gillian Madeley	630	52.1	−3.1
Liberal Democrats	Martin Lury	269	22.2	+10.3
BNP	Michael Witchell	165	13.6	+13.6
UKIP	Joan Phillips	89	7.4	−4.6
Labour	Michelle White	56	4.6	+4.6
Majority		361	29.9	N/A
Turnout		1,209	30.2	−8.5
Conservative hold		Swing		

=== 2011-2015 ===
Aldwick East by-election 14 March 2013
Party	Candidate	Votes	%	±%
Liberal Democrats	Paul Wells	383	33.6	+17.9
Conservative	Bill Smee	357	31.3	−32.6
UKIP	Janet Taylor	339	29.7	+22.6
Labour	Richard Dawson	61	5.3	−1.3
Majority		26	2.3	
Turnout		1,141	26.8	−26.2
Liberal Democrats gain from Conservative		Swing	25.3	

Angmering by-election 18 April 2013
Party	Candidate	Votes	%	±%
Conservative	Andy Cooper	878	63.9	+22.3
Labour	Carly Godwin	268	19.5	+1.5
Liberal Democrats	Jamie Bennett	228	16.6	+4.8
Majority		610	34.4	
Turnout		1,141	23.4	−21.4
Conservative hold		Swing	10.4	

=== 2015-2019 ===
Aldwick West by-election 2 November 2017
Party	Candidate	Votes	%	±%
Liberal Democrats	Martin Smith	719	52.7	+17.9
Conservative	Guy Purser	480	36.2	−32.6
Labour	Ian Manion	112	8.2	New
Green	Carol Birch	54	4.0	New
Majority		239	17.5	
Turnout		1,369	26.3	−26.2
Liberal Democrats gain from Conservative		Swing	25.5	

Marine by-election 22 February 2018
Party	Candidate	Votes	%	±%
Liberal Democrats	Matt Stanley	309	32.7	New
Labour	Alison Sharples	252	26.7	+7.3
Conservative	Katherine Eccles	242	25.6	−0.7
Independent	Steve Goodheart	141	14.9	New
Majority		57	6.0	
Turnout		950	20.1	−30.7
Liberal Democrats gain from Conservative		Swing	16.7	

=== 2019-2023 ===
Brookfield by-election 6 May 2021
Party	Candidate	Votes	%	±%
Conservative	David Chace	680	48.5	+17.7
Liberal Democrats	Roberta Woodman	526	37.5	−21.0
Labour	Freddie Tandy	152	10.8	+0.1
Workers Party	Jonathan Maxted	45	3.2	+3.2
Majority		154	11.0	
Turnout		1,411	29.6	+1.1
Conservative gain from Liberal Democrats		Swing	19.4	

Pevensey by-election 6 May 2021
Party	Candidate	Votes	%	±%
Conservative	Joan English	357	38.3	+16.4
Liberal Democrats	John Barrett	210	22.5	−6.9
Labour	Simon McDougall	140	15.0	−0.6
Independent	Jan Cosgrove	132	14.2	New
Green	Carol Birch	93	10.0	New
Majority		147	15.8	
Turnout		947	22.4	−3.3
Conservative gain from Liberal Democrats		Swing	11.7	

Barnham by-election 8 September 2022
Party	Candidate	Votes	%	±%
Green	Sue Wallsgrove	786	50.9	+6.8
Conservative	Graham Jones	641	41.5	−8.6
Labour	Alan Butcher	116	7.5	−14.0
Majority		145	9.4	
Turnout		1,547	21.3	−7.6
Green gain from Conservative		Swing		

Arundel and Walberton by-election 1 December 2022
Party	Candidate	Votes	%	±%
Green	Stephen McAuliffe	873	47.7	+21.9
Conservative	Mario Trabucco	549	30.0	−1.8
Labour	Michael Ward	407	22.3	+9.9
Majority		324	17.7	
Turnout		1,829		
Green hold		Swing		

=== 2023-2027 ===
Marine by-election 24 April 2025
Party	Candidate	Votes	%	±%
Reform	Giuliano Pinnelli	306	26.0	
Liberal Democrats	Paul Wells	296	25.2	
Labour	Alison Terry	236	20.1	
Conservative	Diana Thas	192	16.3	
Green	John Erskine	115	9.8	
Independent	Phil Woodall	31	2.6	
Majority		10	0.9	
Turnout		1,176		
Reform gain from Independent		Swing		

== See also ==
- 1983 Arun District Council election (New ward boundaries)
- 1987 Arun District Council election (District boundary changes took place but the number of seats remained the same)
- 1999 Arun District Council election
- 2003 Arun District Council election (New ward boundaries)
- 2007 Arun District Council election
- 2011 Arun District Council election
- 2015 Arun District Council election (New ward boundaries)
- 2019 Arun District Council election
- 2023 Arun District Council election
