= 2015 Arun District Council election =

2015 UK local government election

| ← 2011 | 7 May 2015 | 2019 → |

All 54 council seats 28 seats needed for a majority

| | First party | Second party | Third party |
|---|---|---|---|
| Party | Conservative | Liberal Democrats | UKIP |
| Last election | 48 seats, 50.9% | 4 seats, 18.7% | 0 seats, 8.5% |
| Seats won | 42 | 5 | 4 |
| Seat change | ▼4 | ▲1 | ▲4 |
| Popular vote | 38,322 | 12,627 | 20,695 |
| Percentage | 41.6% | 13.7% | 22.5% |
| Swing | ▼9.3% | ▼5.0% | ▲14.0% |
- Winner of each seat at the 2015 Arun District Council election
Previous Largest Party before election
Conservative
Subsequent Largest Party
Conservative

The Arun District Council elections, 2015 took place on Thursday 7 May 2015, electing all 54 members of the council, and taking place alongside a general election and other local elections in England.

From the previous election, the council had undergone boundary changes which had reduced their number by 2. One councillor in Bersted had defected from the Liberal Democrats to the Green Party, bringing in the first Green councillor on Arun since the authority was formed in 1973.

Following the elections, the Conservatives held control of the council for their 12th term of office, with Cllr Gill Brown continuing as leader.

== Election result ==
Arun District Council Election Result 2015
| Party | Seats | Gains | Losses | Net gain/loss | Seats % | Votes % | Votes | +/− |
|---|---|---|---|---|---|---|---|---|
| Conservative | 42 | 1 | 5 | -4 | 77.8% | 41.6% | 38,322 | -9.3% |
| Liberal Democrats | 5 | 2 | 1 | +1 | 9.3% | 13.7% | 12,627 | -5.0% |
| UKIP | 4 | 4 | 0 | +4 | 7.4% | 22.5% | 20,695 | +14.0% |
| Independent | 2 | 1 | 0 | +1 | 3.7% | 7.7% | 7,081 | +3.4% |
| Labour | 1 | 0 | 2 | -2 | 1.9% | 10.9% | 9,999 | -4.9% |
| Green | 0 | 0 | 0 | 0 | 0.0% | 3.6% | 3,341 | +3.6% |

== Ward results ==
=== Aldwick East ===
Aldwick East (2)
| Party | Candidate | Votes | % | ±% |
|---|---|---|---|---|
| Conservative | Trevor Bence* | 1,619 | | |
| Conservative | Gillian Brown* | 1,536 | | |
| UKIP | Michael Warden | 919 | | |
| Independent | Malcolm Daniells | 705 | | |
| Liberal Democrats | Peter Wells | 688 | | |
| Turnout | | | 73.57 | |
| Conservative hold | | Swing | | |
| Conservative hold | | Swing | | |

=== Aldwick West ===
Aldwick West (2)
| Party | Candidate | Votes | % | ±% |
|---|---|---|---|---|
| Conservative | Phil Hitchens* | 1,962 | | |
| Conservative | Jacqui Maconachie* | 1,397 | | |
| UKIP | John Wedderburn | 1122 | | |
| Liberal Democrats | Kenton Batley | 698 | | |
| Liberal Democrats | Alan Gale | 635 | | |
| Turnout | | | 69.05 | |
| Conservative hold | | Swing | | |
| Conservative hold | | Swing | | |

=== Angmering & Findon ===
Angmering & Findon (3)
| Party | Candidate | Votes | % | ±% |
|---|---|---|---|---|
| Conservative | Paul Bicknell* | 2,963 | | |
| Conservative | Dudley Wensley* | 2,325 | | |
| Conservative | Andrew Cooper* | 2,212 | | |
| UKIP | Mark Dyson | 1418 | | |
| Liberal Democrats | David Bliss | 998 | | |
| Labour | Alison Baker | 887 | | |
| Green | Lionel Smith | 796 | | |
| Liberal Democrats | Malcolm Taylor | 706 | | |
| Turnout | | | 72.78 | |
| Conservative hold | | Swing | | |
| Conservative hold | | Swing | | |
| Conservative hold | | Swing | | |

=== Arundel & Walberton ===
Arundel & Walberton (3)
| Party | Candidate | Votes | % | ±% |
|---|---|---|---|---|
| Conservative | Paul Dendle* | 2,691 | | |
| Conservative | Norman Dingemans* | 2,448 | | |
| Conservative | Robert Wheal | 1,994 | | |
| Independent | Jeremy Johnstone | 1166 | | |
| UKIP | Tricia Wales | 1151 | | |
| Labour | Christopher Wood | 938 | | |
| Turnout | | | 72.94 | |
| Conservative hold | | Swing | | |
| Conservative hold | | Swing | | |
| Conservative hold | | Swing | | |

=== Barnham ===
Barnham (3)
| Party | Candidate | Votes | % | ±% |
|---|---|---|---|---|
| Conservative | Keith Ballard | 1,994 | | |
| Conservative | Christopher Hughes | 1,644 | | |
| Conservative | John Charles* | 1,491 | | |
| UKIP | Tony Dixon | 1187 | | |
| Independent | Ian Truin | 1115 | | |
| UKIP | Graham Draper | 1041 | | |
| Green | Isabel Thurston | 1033 | | |
| Labour | Alwyn Dow | 710 | | |
| Turnout | | | 68.70 | |
| Conservative hold | | Swing | | |
| Conservative hold | | Swing | | |
| Conservative hold | | Swing | | |

=== Beach ===
Beach (2)
| Party | Candidate | Votes | % | ±% |
|---|---|---|---|---|
| Liberal Democrats | James Walsh* | 1,671 | | |
| Liberal Democrats | Dan Purchese | 1,434 | | |
| Conservative | Jill Long | 786 | | |
| Labour | Steve McConnell | 260 | | |
| Labour | Ron Felpts | 245 | | |
| Turnout | | | 67.73 | |
| Liberal Democrats hold | | Swing | | |
| Liberal Democrats gain from Conservative | | Swing | | |

=== Bersted ===
Bersted (3)
| Party | Candidate | Votes | % | ±% |
|---|---|---|---|---|
| Conservative | Susan Bence | 1,625 | | |
| UKIP | Ann Rapnik | 1,497 | | |
| Conservative | Jacqueline Pendleton | 1,156 | | |
| Liberal Democrats | Phil Woodall | 798 | | |
| Liberal Democrats | Darren Dawes | 795 | | |
| Liberal Democrats | James Young | 667 | | |
| Green | Simon McDougall* | 647 | | |
| Green | Susan Livett | 577 | | |
| Green | Martin Lury | 525 | | |
| Turnout | | | 58.36 | |
| Conservative hold | | Swing | | |
| UKIP gain from Conservative | | Swing | | |
| Conservative gain from Liberal Democrats | | Swing | | |

=== Brookfield ===
Brookfield (2)
| Party | Candidate | Votes | % | ±% |
|---|---|---|---|---|
| Conservative | Alan Gammon* | 1,363 | | |
| Conservative | Mick Warren | 1,029 | | |
| UKIP | Geoff Holloway | 825 | | |
| Labour | Bill Mears | 521 | | |
| Liberal Democrats | Anchorette Parvin-Blackstone | 509 | | |
| Labour | Mary Mears | 444 | | |
| Turnout | | | 62.69 | |
| Conservative hold | | Swing | | |
| Conservative hold | | Swing | | |

=== Courtwick with Toddington ===
Courtwick with Toddington (3)
| Party | Candidate | Votes | % | ±% |
|---|---|---|---|---|
| Conservative | Marian Ayers | 1,415 | | |
| UKIP | Victoria Rhodes | 991 | | |
| Labour | Mike Northeast* | 876 | | |
| Labour | Anthony Squires | 866 | | |
| Labour | George O'Neill | 709 | | |
| Liberal Democrats | Mark Foster | 694 | | |
| Liberal Democrats | Paul Graydon | 469 | | |
| Liberal Democrats | David Leggatt | 375 | | |
| Independent | David Jones | 368 | | |
| Turnout | | | 56.30 | |
| Conservative hold | | Swing | | |
| UKIP gain from Conservative | | Swing | | |
| Labour hold | | Swing | | |

=== East Preston ===
East Preston (3)
| Party | Candidate | Votes | % | ±% |
|---|---|---|---|---|
| Conservative | Richard Bower* | 2,921 | | |
| Conservative | Terence Chapman* | 2,909 | | |
| Conservative | Mike Clayden | 2,326 | | |
| UKIP | Teresa Bullock | 1439 | | |
| Labour | Tony Dines | 1081 | | |
| Turnout | | | 72.90 | |
| Conservative hold | | Swing | | |
| Conservative hold | | Swing | | |
| Conservative hold | | Swing | | |

=== Felpham East ===
Felpham East (2)
| Party | Candidate | Votes | % | ±% |
|---|---|---|---|---|
| Conservative | David Edwards | 1,586 | | |
| Conservative | Paul English* | 1,283 | | |
| UKIP | Richard Eldred | 961 | | |
| Liberal Democrats | Michelle Hibbert | 599 | | |
| Liberal Democrats | William Blanchard-Cooper | 457 | | |
| Turnout | | | 69.84 | |
| Conservative hold | | Swing | | |
| Conservative hold | | Swing | | |

=== Felpham West ===
Felpham West (2)
| Party | Candidate | Votes | % | ±% |
|---|---|---|---|---|
| Conservative | Gill Madeley* | 1,505 | | |
| Conservative | Elaine Stainton* | 1,186 | | |
| UKIP | Graham Jones | 960 | | |
| Liberal Democrats | Michael Chapman | 498 | | |
| Liberal Democrats | Adrian Thorpe | 429 | | |
| Turnout | | | 69.67 | |
| Conservative hold | | Swing | | |
| Conservative hold | | Swing | | |

=== Ferring ===
Ferring (2)
| Party | Candidate | Votes | % | ±% |
|---|---|---|---|---|
| Conservative | Roger Elkins* | 1,950 | | |
| Conservative | Colin Oliver-Redgate* | 1,699 | | |
| UKIP | Helen O'Connor-Dixon | 762 | | |
| Labour | Steve O'Donnell | 523 | | |
| Labour | Michael Brown | 476 | | |
| Turnout | | | 76.67 | |
| Conservative hold | | Swing | | |
| Conservative hold | | Swing | | |

=== Hotham ===
Hotham (2)
| Party | Candidate | Votes | % | ±% |
|---|---|---|---|---|
| Conservative | Steve Reynolds | 849 | | |
| Liberal Democrats | Paul Wells | 770 | | |
| Liberal Democrats | Janina Cooper | 593 | | |
| Labour | Pauline Nash | 340 | | |
| Labour | Simon Mouatt | 326 | | |
| Green | David Meagher | 289 | | |
| Green | Conrad Meagher | 262 | | |
| Turnout | | | 51.79 | |
| Conservative hold | | Swing | | |
| Liberal Democrats hold | | Swing | | |

=== Marine ===
Marine (2)
| Party | Candidate | Votes | % | ±% |
|---|---|---|---|---|
| Independent | Jim Brooks* | 994 | | |
| Conservative | Dougal Maconachie | 857 | | |
| UKIP | Martin Lineham | 774 | | |
| Labour | Richard Dawson | 631 | | |
| Turnout | | | 50.80 | |
| Independent hold | | Swing | | |
| Conservative hold | | Swing | | |

=== Middleton-on-Sea ===
Middleton-on-Sea (2)
| Party | Candidate | Votes | % | ±% |
|---|---|---|---|---|
| Conservative | Barbara Oakley | 1,651 | | |
| Conservative | Paul Wotherspoon | 1,354 | | |
| UKIP | Joan Phillips | 1063 | | |
| Liberal Democrats | Stephen Hearn | 524 | | |
| Liberal Democrats | Sandra Toovey | 498 | | |
| Turnout | | | 72.80 | |
| Conservative hold | | Swing | | |
| Conservative hold | | Swing | | |

=== Orchard ===
Orchard (2)
| Party | Candidate | Votes | % | ±% |
|---|---|---|---|---|
| Liberal Democrats | Francis Oppler* | 963 | | |
| Conservative | Leonard Brown* | 884 | | |
| Liberal Democrats | Bill Toovey | 693 | | |
| Labour | Jan Cosgrove | 596 | | |
| Labour | Michelle White | 430 | | |
| | Pawel Kozuchowski | 93 | | |
| Turnout | | | 54.56 | |
| Liberal Democrats hold | | Swing | | |
| Conservative hold | | Swing | | |

=== Pagham ===
Pagham (2)
| Party | Candidate | Votes | % | ±% |
|---|---|---|---|---|
| Conservative | Anita Dawn Hall* | 1,894 | | |
| Conservative | Ashvinkumar Patel* | 1,374 | | |
| UKIP | Tony Sutcliffe | 1365 | | |
| Liberal Democrats | Catherine Morrish | 749 | | |
| Liberal Democrats | Jeanette Warr | 505 | | |
| Turnout | | | 70.70 | |
| Conservative hold | | Swing | | |
| Conservative hold | | Swing | | |

=== Pevensey ===
Pevensey (2)
| Party | Candidate | Votes | % | ±% |
|---|---|---|---|---|
| Conservative | Pat Dillon | 802 | | |
| Independent | Sandra Daniells | 778 | | |
| Independent | Adam Cunard | 691 | | |
| Labour | Roger Nash* | 578 | | |
| Labour | Gilbert Cockburn | 464 | | |
| Turnout | | | 54.60 | |
| Conservative hold | | Swing | | |
| Independent gain from Labour | | Swing | | |

=== River ===
River (3)
| Party | Candidate | Votes | % | ±% |
|---|---|---|---|---|
| Liberal Democrats | Ian Buckland | 1,239 | | |
| Conservative | George Blampied | 1,172 | | |
| UKIP | Colin Cates | 1,009 | | |
| Independent | Malcolm Belchamber | 1002 | | |
| Labour | Alan Butcher | 844 | | |
| Liberal Democrats | Joan Rickeard | 751 | | |
| Liberal Democrats | Emily Tester | 608 | | |
| Labour | Bernie May | 600 | | |
| Green | David Austin | 576 | | |
| Labour | Maralyn May | 570 | | |
| Turnout | | | 57.03 | |
| Liberal Democrats gain from Conservative | | Swing | | |
| Conservative hold | | Swing | | |
| UKIP gain from Labour | | Swing | | |

=== Rustington East ===
Rustington East (2)
| Party | Candidate | Votes | % | ±% |
|---|---|---|---|---|
| Conservative | Emma Neno | 1,509 | 30.7% | |
| Conservative | Graham Tyler* | 1,394 | 28.4% | |
| UKIP | Stewart England | 802 | 16.3% | |
| Liberal Democrats | Jamie Bennett | 421 | 8.6% | |
| Labour | Adrian Midgley | 413 | 8.4% | |
| Liberal Democrats | Trevor Richards | 378 | 7.7% | |
| Turnout | | 4,917 | 68.13 | |
| Conservative hold | | Swing | | |
| Conservative hold | | Swing | | |

=== Rustington West ===
Rustington West (3)
| Party | Candidate | Votes | % | ±% |
|---|---|---|---|---|
| Conservative | Phillipa Bower | 2,362 | | |
| Conservative | Pauline Harrison-Horn | 2,284 | | |
| Conservative | Stella Porter | 1,847 | | |
| UKIP | Paul Davis | 1267 | | |
| Independent | Alison Cooper | 860 | | |
| Liberal Democrats | Anne Purchese | 808 | | |
| Labour | Nigel Stapley | 801 | | |
| Liberal Democrats | Joanne Calvert | 675 | | |
| | Joby Akira | 203 | | |
| Turnout | | | 70.29 | |
| Conservative hold | | Swing | | |
| Conservative hold | | Swing | | |
| Conservative hold | | Swing | | |

=== Yapton ===
Yapton (2)
| Party | Candidate | Votes | % | ±% |
|---|---|---|---|---|
| Conservative | Stephen Haymes* | 1,962 | | |
| UKIP | Derek Ambler | 1,183 | | |
| Conservative | Gary Markwell | 1125 | | |
| Turnout | | | 65.50 | |
| Conservative hold | | Swing | | |
| UKIP gain from Conservative | | Swing | | |
