= 2003 Arun District Council election =

2003 UK local government election

Map of the results of the 2003 Arun council election. Conservatives in blue, Liberal Democrats in yellow, Labour in red and Independent in grey.

The 2003 Arun District Council election took place on 1 May 2003 to elect members of Arun District Council in West Sussex, England. The whole council was up for election with boundary changes since the last election in 1999. The Conservative Party stayed in overall control of the council.

== Campaign ==
Before the election the Conservatives ran the council, as they had since it was founded in 1973, with 37 seats, compared to 9 Liberal Democrats, 8 Labour and 2 Independent councillors. In total 138 candidates stood for the 56 seats being contested over 27 wards, with the boundaries having been changed since the 1999 election.

Issues in the election included council tax levels, refuse collection, the closure of Arundel Pool, a shortage of low cost homes, crime and anti-social behaviour and plans to devolve power more locally within the council area.

== Election result ==
The results saw the Conservatives stay in control of the council after winning 36 seats, compared to 11 Liberal Democrats, 8 Labour and 1 independent. The leaders of each of the Liberal Democrats, John Richards, Labour, Roger Nash, and independents Bill Redman, were all defeated at the election, with the Labour leader Roger Nash losing by 1 vote in Pevensey ward.

Arun local election result 2003
Party	Seats	Gains	Losses	Net gain/loss	Seats %	Votes %	Votes	+/−
Conservative	36			0	64.3	52.8	35,106	+2.5%
Liberal Democrats	11			+1	19.6	28.3	18,834	+0.8%
Labour	8			0	14.3	13.9	9,250	-4.2%
Independent	1			-1	1.8	4.4	2,914	+0.3%
UKIP	0			0	0	0.6	431	+0.6%

== Ward results ==
Aldwick East (2)
Party	Candidate	Votes	%	±%
Conservative	Gillian Brown	890	28.8	
Conservative	Robin Brown	872	28.2	
Liberal Democrats	William Wolforth	529	17.1	
Liberal Democrats	Brian Dodd	524	17.0	
Labour	Michael Neville	154	4.5	
Labour	Simon Mouatt	125	4.0	
Turnout		3,094	39.6	

Aldwick West (2)
Party	Candidate	Votes	%	±%
Conservative	Frances Coleman	875	34.0	
Conservative	Jacqueline Maconachie	789	30.1	
Liberal Democrats	Janet Collier	289	11.2	
Liberal Democrats	Gary Smith	251	9.7	
Labour	Raymond Leigh	203	7.9	
Labour	Leslie Rich	171	6.6	
Turnout		2,578	33.3	

Angmering (3)
Party	Candidate	Votes	%	±%
Conservative	Julie Hazelhurst	886	29.6	
Conservative	Michael Church	862	28.8	
Conservative	Oliver Wingrove	733	24.5	
Liberal Democrats	Margaret Munro	512	17.1	
Turnout		2,993	28.0	

Arundel (2)
Party	Candidate	Votes	%	±%
Independent	Donald Ayling	803	30.6	
Conservative	Steven Dendle	675	25.7	
Independent	William Redman	631	24.0	
Liberal Democrats	Ivan Olney	410	15.6	
Labour	Peter Slowe	107	4.1	
Turnout		2,626	42.3	

Barnham (3)
Party	Candidate	Votes	%	±%
Conservative	Jean Goad	1,322	25.4	
Conservative	Anthony Dixon	1,220	23.5	
Conservative	Richard Wilby	1,185	22.8	
Liberal Democrats	Ian Menzies	613	11.8	
Liberal Democrats	Barbara Roberts	442	8.5	
Liberal Democrats	Alfred Roberts	413	7.9	
Turnout		5,195	30.3	

Beach (2)
Party	Candidate	Votes	%	±%
Liberal Democrats	James Walsh	647	31.0	
Liberal Democrats	Richard James	558	26.8	
Conservative	David Hodgson	473	22.7	
Labour	Andrew McTaggart	211	10.1	
Labour	Andy Parker	196	9.4	
Turnout		2,085	33.0	

Bersted (3)
Party	Candidate	Votes	%	±%
Liberal Democrats	Simon McDougall	801	22.0	
Liberal Democrats	Sylvia Olliver	780	21.4	
Liberal Democrats	Martin Lury	718	19.8	
Conservative	Eric Pond	375	10.3	
Labour	Patrick Hastings	364	10.0	
Labour	Simon Holland	319	8.8	
Labour	Gail Walker	278	7.6	
Turnout		3,635	24.6	

Brookfield (2)
Party	Candidate	Votes	%	±%
Conservative	Alan Gammon	357	24.4	
Labour	David Dyball	334	22.8	
Labour	Mark Thomson	303	20.7	
Liberal Democrats	Paul Graydon	238	16.2	
Liberal Democrats	Nicholas Wiltshire	233	15.9	
Turnout		1,465	22.0	

East Preston with Kingston (3)
Party	Candidate	Votes	%	±%
Conservative	Richard Bower	1,374	30.0	
Conservative	John Rankin	1,345	29.3	
Conservative	Dennis Wilde	1,308	28.5	
Liberal Democrats	George Schlich	563	12.3	
Turnout		4,590	32.9	

Felpham East (2)
Party	Candidate	Votes	%	±%
Conservative	Susan Kelly	712	32.0	
Conservative	Simon Weston	602	27.1	
Independent	Michael Harvey	571	25.7	
Labour	Stephen McConnell	172	7.7	
Labour	Sharon Whitlam	166	7.5	
Turnout		2,223	32.8	

Felpham West (2)
Party	Candidate	Votes	%	±%
Conservative	Alan Stainton	684	27.4	
Conservative	Elaine Stainton	612	24.5	
Independent	Mary Harvey	547	22.0	
Liberal Democrats	Michael Chapman	274	11.0	
Liberal Democrats	Michelle White	155	6.2	
Labour	Melanie Webb	121	4.8	
Labour	Sharon Kingswell	102	4.1	
Turnout		2,495	34.8	

Ferring (2)
Party	Candidate	Votes	%	±%
Conservative	Roger Elkins	1,092	38.1	
Conservative	David Hill	1,052	36.7	
Labour	Henry Miller	382	13.3	
Liberal Democrats	Lyndsey Green	341	11.9	
Turnout		2,867	41.9	

Findon
Party	Candidate	Votes	%	±%
Conservative	Stephen Brookman	564	77.3	
Liberal Democrats	Kay Schlich	166	22.7	
Majority		398	54.6	
Turnout		730	37.3	

Ham (2)
Party	Candidate	Votes	%	±%
Labour	Anthony Squires	375	29.3	
Labour	Michael Northeast	350	27.3	
Conservative	Sarah Britton	213	16.6	
Liberal Democrats	Anchorette Blackstone	179	14.0	
Liberal Democrats	John Wedderburn	163	12.7	
Turnout		1,280	21.0	

Hotham (2)
Party	Candidate	Votes	%	±%
Liberal Democrats	Jeanette Warr	313	19.1	
Liberal Democrats	Paul Wells	313	19.1	
Conservative	Andrew Evans	287	17.5	
Conservative	Edwin Gyde	270	16.5	
Labour	Michael Jones	240	14.6	
Labour	Carole Richmond	217	13.2	
Turnout		1,640	23.1	

Marine (2)
Party	Candidate	Votes	%	±%
Liberal Democrats	Kenneth Scutt	455	23.6	
Liberal Democrats	Ian Harding	419	21.7	
Conservative	Douglas Maconachie	388	20.1	
Conservative	George Blampied	355	18.4	
Labour	Pauline Nash	158	8.2	
Labour	Catherine Mouatt	152	7.9	
Turnout		1,927	26.8	

Middleton-on-Sea (2)
Party	Candidate	Votes	%	±%
Conservative	Barbara Oakley	1,008	38.0	
Conservative	Paul Wotherspoon	874	33.0	
Liberal Democrats	Roslyn Kissell	358	13.5	
Labour	Priscilla Matcham	268	10.1	
Labour	Edward Nattrass	143	5.4	
Turnout		2,651	33.8	

Orchard (2)
Party	Candidate	Votes	%	±%
Liberal Democrats	Francis Oppler	417	26.1	
Liberal Democrats	David Biss	387	24.2	
Labour	Jasper Richmond	261	16.4	
Labour	Alison Sharples	255	16.0	
Conservative	Jean Pereira	140	8.8	
Conservative	Martin Pereira	136	8.5	
Turnout		1,596	21.1	

Pagham and Rose Green (3)
Party	Candidate	Votes	%	±%
Conservative	Leonard Brown	918	19.9	
Conservative	Anita Hall	917	19.9	
Conservative	Ashvinkumar Patel	913	19.8	
Liberal Democrats	Sara Allen	406	8.8	
Liberal Democrats	Jennifer Gillibrand	354	7.7	
Liberal Democrats	Robert Gillibrand	331	7.2	
Labour	Anne-Marie Norman	283	6.1	
Labour	Michael Phillips	252	5.5	
Labour	Jeremy Tomlinson	236	5.1	
Turnout		4,610	27.3	

Pevensey (2)
Party	Candidate	Votes	%	±%
Conservative	Sandra Daniells	330	20.8	
Labour	Jan Cosgrove	324	20.4	
Labour	Roger Nash	323	20.4	
Liberal Democrats	Kenneth Olliver	311	19.6	
Liberal Democrats	Vincent McCabe	299	18.8	
Turnout		1,587	25.5	

River (2)
Party	Candidate	Votes	%	±%
Labour	Mark Butler	395	22.4	
Labour	Wendy Squires	360	20.4	
Conservative	David Britton	331	18.8	
Liberal Democrats	Natasha Lear	259	14.7	
Independent	John Cockrell	235	13.3	
Liberal Democrats	Mark Winterford	184	10.4	
Turnout		1,764	30.5	

Rustington East (2)
Party	Candidate	Votes	%	±%
Conservative	Philippa Bower	855	33.7	
Conservative	John Rose	845	33.3	
Liberal Democrats	Irene Richards	419	16.5	
Liberal Democrats	Allan Turner	416	16.4	
Turnout		2,535	33.8	

Rustington West (3)
Party	Candidate	Votes	%	±%
Conservative	Raymond Steward	1,009		
Conservative	Harold Parris	1,005	18.0	
Conservative	Graham Tyler	974	17.4	
Liberal Democrats	Val Capon	726	12.9	
Liberal Democrats	John Ceriog-Hughes	649	11.6	
Liberal Democrats	John Richards	595	10.6	
UKIP	Janet Penn	431	7.7	
Labour	Edward Walsh	222	4.0	
Turnout		5,611	33.1	

Walberton
Party	Candidate	Votes	%	±%
Conservative	Norman Dingemans	646	72.3	
Liberal Democrats	George Fletcher	248	27.7	
Majority		398	44.6	
Turnout		894	39.8	

Wick with Toddington (2)
Party	Candidate	Votes	%	±%
Labour	George O'Neill	373	20.3	
Labour	Alan Butcher	355	19.3	
Conservative	Derek Hulmes	344	18.7	
Liberal Democrats	David Jones	338	18.4	
Liberal Democrats	Kevin Weller	304	16.5	
Independent	Lilias Cheyne	127	6.9	
Turnout		1,841	29.8	

Yapton (2)
Party	Candidate	Votes	%	±%
Conservative	John Matthews	752	37.2	
Conservative	Stephen Haymes	737	36.4	
Liberal Democrats	Ronald Probert	270	13.3	
Liberal Democrats	William Robinson	264	13.0	
Turnout		2,023	28.0	
