= 2023 Arun District Council election =

2023 District council election in England

- 4 May 2023

All 54 council seats on Arun District Council 28 seats needed for a majority
- Turnout: 30.4%
	First party	Second party	Third party
Party	Conservative	Liberal Democrats	Labour
Last election	21 seats, 42.3%	22 seats, 31.0%	1 seats, 11.6%
Seats won	20	14	8
Seat change	▼1	▼8	▲7
Popular vote	34,319	17,845	12,604
Percentage	40.7%	21.1%	14.9%
Swing	▼1.6%	▼9.9%	▲3.3%
	Fourth party	Fifth party
Party	Green	Independent
Last election	2 seats, 3.0%	8 seats, 9.3%
Seats won	6	6
Seat change	▲4	▼2
Popular vote	12,270	7,035
Percentage	14.5%	8.3%
Swing	▲11.5%	▼1.0%
- Winner of each seat at the 2023 Arun District Council election
Leader before election
No overall control
Leader after election
No overall control

The 2023 Arun District Council election took place on 4 May 2023 to elect members of Arun District Council in West Sussex, England. This was on the same day as other local elections in England.

The council was under no overall control prior to the election, being led by a Conservative minority administration. Following the election the council remained under no overall control, but a Liberal Democrat, Labour, Green and Independent alliance formed to take over the leadership of the council. The Liberal Democrats appointed Matt Stanley as their new group leader after the election, and as the Liberal Democrats are the largest group in the alliance, he was appointed leader of the council at the subsequent annual council meeting on 31 May 2023.

== Pre-election composition ==
The result at the last election and the current composition of the council is given below:

Affiliation	Members		
Affiliation	Elected	Current	Change
Conservative	21	23	▲2
Liberal Democrats	22	17	▼5
Independent	8	10	▲2
Green	2	3	▲1
Labour	1	1	Steady
Total	54	54	Steady

== Overall results ==
The results were:

2023 Arun District Council election
Party	Candidates	Seats	Gains	Losses	Net gain/loss	Seats %	Votes %	Votes	+/−
Conservative	49	20	7	8	▼1	37.0	40.6	34,319	–1.7
Liberal Democrats	30	14	1	9	▼8	25.9	21.1	17,845	–9.9
Labour	29	8	7	0	▲7	14.8	14.9	12,604	+3.3
Green	18	6	4	0	▲4	11.1	14.5	12,270	+11.5
Independent	14	6	0	2	▼2	11.1	8.3	7,035	–1.0
Heritage	3	0	0	0	Steady	0.0	0.4	313	N/A
TUSC	1	0	0	0	Steady	0.0	0.1	56	N/A

== Ward results ==
The Statement of Persons Nominated, which details the candidates standing in each ward, was released by Arun District Council following the close of nominations on 5 April 2023. The results for each ward were as follows, with an asterisk (*) indicating an incumbent councillor standing for re-election.

=== Aldwick East ===
Aldwick East (2 seats)
Party	Candidate	Votes	%	±%
Conservative	Ash Patel	768	42.5	+4.4
Conservative	Trevor William Bence	729	40.4	−0.1
Independent	Fiona Huntley	643	35.6	N/A
Independent	Ian Manion	539	29.8	N/A
Green	Justin Adam Bell	332	18.4	N/A
Labour	Ray Palmer	327	18.1	N/A
Majority		86	4.8	
Registered electors		4,534		
Turnout		1,806	39.92	
Rejected ballots		4	0.2	
Conservative gain from Independent		Swing		
Conservative gain from Independent		Swing		

=== Aldwick West ===
Aldwick West (2 seats)
Party	Candidate	Votes	%	±%
Conservative	Guy Purser	657	38.2	+8.4
Liberal Democrats	Claire Needs *	636	37.0	+4.9
Conservative	Diana Thas	601	34.9	+6.3
Liberal Democrats	Paul Ralph	582	33.8	−5.2
Labour	Lynne Armstrong	274	15.9	+9.4
Green	Tony Douglas Coates	255	14.8	±0.0
Heritage	David Kurten	148	8.6	N/A
Majority		35	2.0	
Registered electors		5,127		
Turnout		1,721	33.63	
Rejected ballots		3	0.2	
Conservative gain from Liberal Democrats		Swing		
Liberal Democrats hold		Swing		

=== Angmering and Findon ===
Angmering and Findon (3 seats)
Party	Candidate	Votes	%	±%
Conservative	Paul Bicknell *	1,349	50.3	−6.1
Conservative	Andy Cooper *	1,147	42.7	−4.6
Liberal Democrats	Amelia Worne	1,103	41.1	+10.6
Green	Helen Ruth Justice	1,036	38.6	N/A
Conservative	Kevin Edmundston	1,035	38.6	−8.3
Labour	Paul Anthony Summers	990	36.9	+15.3
Majority		67	2.5	
Registered electors		8,441		
Turnout		2,684	32.11	
Rejected ballots		26	1.0	
Conservative hold		Swing		
Conservative hold		Swing		
Liberal Democrats gain from Conservative		Swing		

=== Arundel and Walberton ===
Arundel and Walberton (3 seats)
Party	Candidate	Votes	%	±%
Green	Stephen McAuliffe *	1,471	56.9	+18.0
Green	Carol Jane Birch	1,363	52.7	N/A
Green	Melanie Jill Penycate	1,198	46.3	N/A
Conservative	Gary Markwell	833	32.2	−15.7
Conservative	Stephen Reynolds	787	30.4	−10.2
Conservative	Mario Trabucco	733	28.3	−9.2
Labour	Michael Ward	714	27.6	+9.0
Majority		365	14.1	
Registered electors		6,991		
Turnout		2,586	37.23	
Rejected ballots		17	0.7	
Green gain from Conservative		Swing		
Green gain from Conservative		Swing		
Green hold		Swing		

Steve McAuliffe was previously elected at a by-election, retaining one of the Green seats.

=== Barnham ===
Barnham (3 seats)
Party	Candidate	Votes	%	±%
Green	Paul Brian Ayling	1,316	59.4	+15.3
Green	Sue Jennifer Ellen Wallsgrove *	1,252	56.5	N/A
Green	Anita June Lawrence	1,030	46.5	N/A
Conservative	Stephen Haymes	712	32.1	−18.0
Conservative	Susan Bence	677	30.6	−9.8
Conservative	Graham Lewis Jones	620	28.0	−7.4
Labour	William John Ashton	425	19.2	−2.3
TUSC	Susan Welch	56	2.5	N/A
Majority		318	14.4	
Registered electors		7,599		
Turnout		2,216	29.31	
Rejected ballots		11	0.5	
Green gain from Conservative		Swing		
Green hold		Swing		
Green gain from Conservative		Swing		

Sue Wallsgrove was previously elected at a by-election, gaining one of the Conservative seats.

=== Beach ===
Beach (2 seats)
Party	Candidate	Votes	%	±%
Liberal Democrats	Billy Blanchard-Cooper	782	55.4	−10.5
Liberal Democrats	Bob Woodman	697	49.4	−8.6
Conservative	Mick Warren	433	30.7	+7.2
Conservative	Travis Hayler	392	27.8	+4.4
Labour	Stephen Bernard McConnell	230	16.3	+6.9
Labour	Michael Terence Murphy	203	14.4	+4.9
Majority		264	18.7	
Registered electors		3,856		
Turnout		1,411	37.01	
Rejected ballots		16	1.1	
Liberal Democrats hold		Swing		
Liberal Democrats hold		Swing		

=== Bersted ===
Bersted (3 seats)
Party	Candidate	Votes	%	±%
Conservative	Keir Greenway	852	47.4	+20.6
Liberal Democrats	Gill Yeates *	841	46.8	+4.9
Liberal Democrats	Martin Lury *	826	46.0	+6.2
Conservative	David Raymond Paige	610	34.0	+9.9
Labour	Nigel Smith	540	30.1	+17.2
Conservative	Rob Outen	513	28.6	+7.4
Majority		216	12.0	
Registered electors		7,547		
Turnout		1,796	23.97	
Rejected ballots		13	0.7	
Conservative gain from Liberal Democrats		Swing		
Liberal Democrats hold		Swing		
Liberal Democrats hold		Swing		

=== Brookfield ===
Brookfield (2 seats)
Party	Candidate	Votes	%	±%
Liberal Democrats	James Michael Meade Walsh	618	48.1	−8.5
Liberal Democrats	Jill Irene Fortnam Long	586	45.6	−9.1
Conservative	Mikey Blackwood	409	31.9	+2.6
Conservative	David Edward Chace *	404	31.5	+2.3
Labour	Neil Alistair Campbell	265	20.6	+10.5
Heritage	Jane Neal	61	4.8	N/A
Majority		177	13.8	
Registered electors		4,792		
Turnout		1,284	27.13	
Rejected ballots		16	1.2	
Liberal Democrats hold		Swing		
Liberal Democrats hold		Swing		

David Chace was previously elected at a by-election, gaining one of the Liberal Democrat seats.

=== Courtwick with Toddington ===
Courtwick with Toddington (3 seats)
Party	Candidate	Votes	%	±%
Labour	Mike Northeast *	766	47.5	+7.4
Labour	Maralyn May	695	43.1	+8.6
Labour	Freddie William Tandy	637	39.5	+5.0
Conservative	Tony Woodward	582	36.1	−4.9
Conservative	Vicky Rhodes *	530	32.8	−4.5
Conservative	Rod Vincent	523	32.4	−2.4
Green	Deborah O'Reilly	356	22.1	N/A
Liberal Democrats	Saša Krajnc	242	15.0	−9.7
Majority		55	3.4	
Registered electors		7,965		
Turnout		1,614	20.44	
Rejected ballots		14	0.9	
Labour hold		Swing		
Labour gain from Conservative		Swing		
Labour gain from Conservative		Swing		

=== East Preston ===
East Preston (3 seats)
Party	Candidate	Votes	%	±%
Conservative	Philippa Bower	1,329	54.4	−10.3
Conservative	Paul Kelly *	1,294	52.9	−8.2
Conservative	Ricky Bower *	1,281	52.4	−12.2
Liberal Democrats	John Michael Richards	768	31.4	+4.3
Green	Liz Hammond	740	30.3	N/A
Labour	Alex Haslam	560	22.9	+2.0
Liberal Democrats	David Richard Tilbrook	510	20.9	−6.0
Majority		513	21.0	
Registered electors		7,047		
Turnout		2,444	34.91	
Rejected ballots		16	0.7	
Conservative hold		Swing		
Conservative hold		Swing		
Conservative hold		Swing		

=== Felpham East ===
Felpham East (2 seats)
Party	Candidate	Votes	%	±%
Independent	Tom Harty	575	43.4	N/A
Conservative	Joan Constance English	530	40.0	−18.9
Conservative	Paul Anthony English *	527	39.7	−21.4
Independent	Rick Parker	506	38.2	N/A
Labour	Stuart Varndall	284	21.4	N/A
Majority		3	0.2	
Registered electors		4,741		
Turnout		1,326	27.99	
Rejected ballots		1	0.1	
Independent gain from Conservative		Swing		
Conservative hold		Swing		

=== Felpham West ===
Felpham West (2 seats)
Party	Candidate	Votes	%	±%
Conservative	Gill Madeley *	651	42.5	−15.4
Conservative	Elaine Stainton *	593	38.7	−15.0
Independent	Martin Harvey	486	31.7	N/A
Green	Linda Lancaster	382	25.0	N/A
Liberal Democrats	Roslyn Anne Kissell	326	21.3	−6.7
Labour	Ray Mills	301	19.7	+8.0
Majority		107	7.0	
Registered electors		4,884		
Turnout		1,531	31.47	
Rejected ballots		6	0.4	
Conservative hold		Swing		
Conservative hold		Swing		

=== Ferring ===
Ferring (2 seats)
Party	Candidate	Votes	%	±%
Conservative	Roger Elkins *	1,018	61.4	−7.3
Conservative	Mark Turner	949	57.3	−11.4
Labour	Dorothy Portia Macedo	403	24.3	+7.0
Liberal Democrats	Barbara Helen Roberts	316	19.1	+5.3
Green	Kerstin Sonnemann	272	16.4	N/A
Majority		546	33.0	
Registered electors		4,184		
Turnout		1,657	39.67	
Rejected ballots		3	0.2	
Conservative hold		Swing		
Conservative hold		Swing		

=== Hotham ===
Hotham (2 seats)
Party	Candidate	Votes	%	±%
Liberal Democrats	Jeanette Warr *	402	42.6	+11.3
Independent	Steve Goodheart *	389	41.3	+3.1
Liberal Democrats	Bob Waterhouse	304	32.2	+1.4
Conservative	David Nicholas Britton	229	24.3	+5.2
Labour	David Meagher	208	22.1	+7.9
Majority		85	9.0	
Registered electors		4,290		
Turnout		943	22.21	
Rejected ballots		10	1.0	
Liberal Democrats hold		Swing		
Independent hold		Swing		

=== Marine ===
Marine (2 seats)
Party	Candidate	Votes	%	±%
Independent	Jim Brooks *	669	59.6	−1.9
Liberal Democrats	Matt Stanley *	468	41.7	+3.1
Labour	Heather Robbins	354	31.5	+12.4
Conservative	Philip Richard James Sanders	295	26.3	+3.5
Majority		114	10.2	
Registered electors		4,815		
Turnout		1,123	23.34	
Rejected ballots		1	0.1	
Independent hold		Swing		
Liberal Democrats hold		Swing		

=== Middleton-on-Sea ===
Middleton-on-Sea (2 seats)
Party	Candidate	Votes	%	±%
Conservative	Jacky Pendleton *	729	49.3	+5.9
Independent	Shirley Yvonne Haywood *	639	43.2	+0.2
Conservative	David Darling	556	37.6	−1.7
Green	Liam Warren	336	22.7	N/A
Labour	Jeff Daws	266	18.0	+12.6
Majority		83	5.6	
Registered electors		4,192		
Turnout		1,478	35.40	
Rejected ballots		6	0.4	
Conservative hold		Swing		
Independent hold		Swing		

=== Orchard ===
Orchard (2 seats)
Party	Candidate	Votes	%	±%
Liberal Democrats	Francis Oppler *	477	47.2	+2.5
Liberal Democrats	Kenton Batley	375	37.1	+3.1
Independent	Phil Woodall	236	23.3	−4.0
Labour	Jan Cosgrove	231	22.8	+2.2
Conservative	Billy Edward Kelly	207	20.5	−0.7
Independent	Kinga Elzbieta Arciszewska	169	16.7	N/A
Majority		139	13.7	
Registered electors		4,727		
Turnout		1,011	21.51	
Rejected ballots		6	0.6	
Liberal Democrats hold		Swing		
Liberal Democrats hold		Swing		

=== Pagham ===
Pagham (2 seats)
Party	Candidate	Votes	%	±%
Independent	David Huntley *	1,037	65.8	+3.2
Independent	June Hamilton *	825	52.3	−2.4
Conservative	Harry Triggs	462	29.3	+8.6
Labour	Pauline Nash	298	18.9	+12.5
Majority		363	23.0	
Registered electors		5,211		
Turnout		1,577	30.30	
Rejected ballots		2	0.1	
Independent hold		Swing		
Independent hold		Swing		

=== Pevensey ===
Pevensey (2 seats)
Party	Candidate	Votes	%	±%
Labour	Roger Nash	292	30.3	+12.5
Labour	Simon McDougall	277	28.7	+9.4
Liberal Democrats	Paul Wells	247	25.6	−13.3
Conservative	Pat Dillon	235	24.4	−1.7
Liberal Democrats	John Barrett	207	21.5	−9.7
Independent	Sandra Elizabeth Daniells *	163	16.9	−22.6
Independent	Adam William Wojtek Cunard	159	16.5	N/A
Green	John Paul Erskine	76	7.9	−23.3
Green	Paul Wyatt	72	7.5	N/A
Majority		30	3.1	
Registered electors		4,077		
Turnout		965	24.04	
Rejected ballots		15	1.5	
Labour gain from Independent		Swing		
Labour gain from Liberal Democrats		Swing		

=== River ===
River (3 seats)
Party	Candidate	Votes	%	±%
Labour	George Keith O'Neill	674	34.8	+11.5
Labour	Alan Terence Butcher	665	34.3	+12.2
Labour	Mary Christine Wiltshire	665	34.3	+14.3
Conservative	Michelle Molloy	559	28.9	+6.5
Conservative	Nigel Smith	505	26.1	+7.3
Conservative	Gary Russell Hart	504	26.0	+9.5
Liberal Democrats	Ian Buckland *	499	25.8	−17.8
Liberal Democrats	Ady Clark	425	21.9	−19.4
Liberal Democrats	Keith Croft	350	18.1	−19.1
Green	Lilias Rider Haggard Cheyne	331	17.1	N/A
Heritage	Gabi Gates	104	5.4	N/A
Majority		106	5.5	
Registered electors		7,126		
Turnout		1,937	27.35	
Rejected ballots		12	0.6	
Labour gain from Liberal Democrats		Swing		
Labour gain from Liberal Democrats		Swing		
Labour gain from Liberal Democrats		Swing		

=== Rustington East ===
Rustington East (2 seats)
Party	Candidate	Votes	%	±%
Conservative	Alison Cooper *	1,086	62.7	+1.5
Conservative	Shaun Gunner *	973	56.2	+2.2
Liberal Democrats	Anchorette Lucy Parvin-Blackstone	557	32.2	+1.0
Labour	Sean Lee	494	28.5	+17.4
Majority		416	24.0	
Registered electors		4,473		
Turnout		1,731	39.01	+3.2
Rejected ballots		14	0.8	
Conservative hold		Swing		
Conservative hold		Swing		

=== Rustington West ===
Rustington West (3 seats)
Party	Candidate	Votes	%	±%
Conservative	Lesley-Anne Lloyd	1,101	45.9	+7.7
Conservative	Peggy Partridge	1,033	43.1	+7.2
Conservative	Lynne Edwards	1,018	42.4	+6.9
Liberal Democrats	Pauline Anne Gregory *	934	38.9	−13.0
Liberal Democrats	Jamie Bennett *	811	33.8	−15.9
Liberal Democrats	Nick Jays	757	31.6	−14.1
Green	Faye Faithful	452	18.8	N/A
Labour	Bernadette Millam	390	16.3	+5.4
Majority		84	3.5	
Registered electors		6,888		
Turnout		2,399	35.05	
Rejected ballots		15	0.6	
Conservative gain from Liberal Democrats		Swing		
Conservative gain from Liberal Democrats		Swing		
Conservative gain from Liberal Democrats		Swing		

=== Yapton ===
Yapton (2 seats)
Party	Candidate	Votes	%	±%
Liberal Democrats	Amanda Worne *	1,160	69.8	+15.6
Liberal Democrats	Henry Jones *	1,039	62.6	+25.3
Conservative	Oli Byron-Davies	395	23.8	−2.1
Conservative	Paul Dendle	364	21.9	−3.2
Labour	Doris Audrey Richards	176	10.6	N/A
Majority		644	38.8	
Registered electors		5,432		
Turnout		1,661	30.73	
Rejected ballots		8	0.5	
Liberal Democrats hold		Swing		
Liberal Democrats hold		Swing		

== Changes 2023–2027 ==
- Conservative councillor Trevor Bence (Aldwick East) left the party to sit as an independent in mid-2024, before joining Reform UK later that year and becoming leader of its group on the council.

=== By-elections ===
==== Marine ====
Marine by-election: 24 April 2025
Party	Candidate	Votes	%	±%
Reform	Giuliano Pinnelli	306	26.0	N/A
Liberal Democrats	Paul Wells	296	25.2	–1.0
Labour	Alison Terry	236	20.1	+0.3
Conservative	Diana Thas	192	16.3	–0.2
Green	John Erskine	115	9.8	N/A
Independent	Phil Woodall	31	2.6	N/A
Majority		10	0.8	N/A
Turnout		1,189	25.3	+2.0
Registered electors		4,699		
Rejected ballots		13	1.1	
Reform gain from Independent				

The by-election was called following the death in January 2025 of Independent councillor Jim Brooks, who had represented Marine ward since 2007.
