= 2007 Arun District Council election =

2007 UK local government election

Map of the results of the 2007 Arun council election. Conservatives in blue, Liberal Democrats in yellow, Labour in red and Independent in grey.

The 2007 Arun District Council election took place on 3 May 2007 to elect members of Arun District Council in West Sussex, England. The whole council was up for election and the Conservative Party stayed in overall control of the council.

== Election result ==
Arun local election result 2007
Party	Seats	Gains	Losses	Net gain/loss	Seats %	Votes %	Votes	+/−
Conservative	42	6	0	+6	75.0	59.8	46,828	+7.0%
Liberal Democrats	9	2	2	0	16.1	18.2	14,229	-10.1%
Labour	3	0	5	-5	5.4	10.5	8,196	-3.4%
Independent	2	0	1	-1	3.6	4.9	3,839	+0.5%
UKIP	0	0	0	0	0	4.7	3,694	+4.1%
BNP	0	0	0	0	0	1.5	1,143	+1.5%
Liberal	0	0	0	0	0	0.6	435	+0.6%

3 Conservative candidates were unopposed.

== Ward results ==
Aldwick East (2)
Party	Candidate	Votes	%	±%
Conservative	Gillian Brown	1,110	32.4	
Conservative	Robin Brown	1,001	29.2	
Independent	Jim Ramage	695	20.3	
UKIP	Thomas Collier	293	8.5	
Labour	Jerry Tomlinson	168	4.9	
Labour	Eddie Walsh	161	4.7	
Turnout		3,428	45.3	+5.7
Conservative hold		Swing		
Conservative hold		Swing		

Aldwick West (2)
Party	Candidate	Votes	%	±%
Conservative	Frances Coleman	1,239	37.1	
Conservative	Jacqui Maconachie	1,090	32.6	
Liberal Democrats	Brian Dodd	534	16.0	
Liberal Democrats	Gary Smith	481	14.4	
Turnout		3,344	43.1	+9.8
Conservative hold		Swing		
Conservative hold		Swing		

Angmering (3)
Party	Candidate	Votes	%	±%
Conservative	Paul Bicknell	1,380	30.6	
Conservative	Julie Hazelhurst	1,318	29.2	
Conservative	Dudley Wensley	1,188	26.3	
UKIP	Mike Hill-Smith	624	13.8	
Turnout		4,510	33.5	+5.5
Conservative hold		Swing		
Conservative hold		Swing		
Conservative hold		Swing		

Arundel (2)
Party	Candidate	Votes	%	±%
Conservative	Don Ayling	unopposed	N/A	
Conservative	Paul Dendle	unopposed	N/A	
Conservative gain from Independent		Swing		
Conservative hold		Swing		

Barnham (3)
Party	Candidate	Votes	%	±%
Conservative	Jean Goad	1,533	31.5	
Conservative	Melissa Briggs	1,512	31.1	
Conservative	Dougal Maconachie	1,105	22.7	
Liberal Democrats	Don Eldridge	711	14.6	
Turnout		4,861	34.4	+4.1
Conservative hold		Swing		
Conservative hold		Swing		
Conservative hold		Swing		

Beach (2)
Party	Candidate	Votes	%	±%
Liberal Democrats	James Walsh	959	33.9	
Liberal Democrats	Nick Wiltshire	799	28.2	
Conservative	Emma Neno	710	25.1	
UKIP	Robert East	212	7.5	
Labour	Monica Dibble	152	5.4	
Turnout		2,832	44.3	+11.3
Liberal Democrats hold		Swing		
Liberal Democrats hold		Swing		

Bersted (3)
Party	Candidate	Votes	%	±%
Conservative	Ann Smee	884	20.5	
Liberal Democrats	Simon McDougall	841	19.5	
Independent	Sylvia Olliver	733	17.0	
Liberal Democrats	Martin Lury	723	16.8	
Liberal Democrats	Berni Millam	585	13.6	
Labour	Jackie Hutchinson	284	6.6	
Labour	Les Rich	262	6.1	
Turnout		4,312	32.3	+7.7
Conservative gain from Liberal Democrats		Swing		
Liberal Democrats hold		Swing		
Independent hold		Swing		

Brookfield (2)
Party	Candidate	Votes	%	±%
Conservative	Joyce Bowyer	543	21.9	
Conservative	Alan Gammon	515	20.8	
Liberal Democrats	Irene Richards	390	15.8	
Liberal Democrats	Trevor Richards	374	15.1	
Labour	David Dyball	283	11.4	
Labour	Steve McConnell	209	8.4	
UKIP	Mike Spencer	161	6.5	
Turnout		2,475	31.1	+9.1
Conservative hold		Swing		
Conservative gain from Labour		Swing		

East Preston with Kingston (3)
Party	Candidate	Votes	%	±%
Conservative	Richard Bower	1,615	24.6	
Conservative	Terence Chapman	1,590	24.2	
Conservative	Dennis Wilde	1,444	22.0	
Independent	Eileen Rankin	578	8.8	
Independent	John Rankin	565	8.6	
UKIP	Clive Maltby	438	6.7	
Labour	Frazer Palmer	333	5.1	
Turnout		6,563	42.8	+9.9
Conservative hold		Swing		
Conservative hold		Swing		
Conservative hold		Swing		

Felpham East (2)
Party	Candidate	Votes	%	±%
Conservative	Paul English	1,004	43.9	
Conservative	John Holman	920	40.2	
Liberal Democrats	Nicholas Hotston	362	15.8	
Turnout		2,286	35.8	+3.0
Conservative hold		Swing		
Conservative hold		Swing		

Felpham West (2)
Party	Candidate	Votes	%	±%
Conservative	Alan Stainton	810	29.1	
Conservative	Elaine Stainton	726	26.1	
Independent	Michael Harvey	585	21.0	
UKIP	George Stride	333	12.0	
Liberal Democrats	Roslyn Kissell	330	11.9	
Turnout		2,784	38.7	+3.9
Conservative hold		Swing		
Conservative hold		Swing		

Ferring (2)
Party	Candidate	Votes	%	±%
Conservative	Roger Elkins	1,447	44.0	
Conservative	Colin Oliver-Redgate	1,340	40.8	
Labour	Ed Miller	501	15.2	
Turnout		3,288	50.3	+8.4
Conservative hold		Swing		
Conservative hold		Swing		

Findon
Party	Candidate	Votes	%	±%
Conservative	Mike Barnett	unopposed	N/A	
Conservative hold		Swing		

Ham (2)
Party	Candidate	Votes	%	±%
Labour	Tony Squires	448	24.1	
Labour	Mike Northeast	396	21.3	
Liberal	Jenny Weights	352	18.9	
Conservative	Delma Mayer-Pezhanzki	338	18.2	
Liberal Democrats	Carol Watton	324	17.4	
Turnout		1,858	28.3	+7.3
Labour hold		Swing		
Labour hold		Swing		

Hotham (2)
Party	Candidate	Votes	%	±%
Liberal Democrats	Paul Wells	591	22.4	
Liberal Democrats	Jeanette Warr	580	22.0	
Conservative	Tony Gardiner	460	17.4	
Conservative	Samantha Gibbons	458	17.4	
Labour	Michael Jones	275	10.4	
Labour	Roger Nash	275	10.4	
Turnout		2,639	34.6	+11.5
Liberal Democrats hold		Swing		
Liberal Democrats hold		Swing		

Marine (2)
Party	Candidate	Votes	%	±%
Independent	Jim Brooks	456	20.0	
Conservative	Andrew Evans	450	19.7	
Conservative	Simon Fyfe	419	18.3	
Liberal Democrats	Ian Harding	346	15.1	
Liberal Democrats	John Hayward	315	13.8	
Labour	Pauline Nash	159	7.0	
Labour	Simon Mouatt	139	6.1	
Turnout		2,284	30.5	+3.7
Independent hold		Swing		
Conservative gain from Liberal Democrats		Swing		

Middleton-on-Sea (2)
Party	Candidate	Votes	%	±%
Conservative	Paul Wotherspoon	1,399	40.5	
Conservative	Barbara Oakley	1,398	40.5	
Liberal Democrats	Michael Chapman	335	9.7	
Labour	Michael Jones	161	4.7	
Labour	Michelle White	159	4.6	
Turnout		3,452	42.1	+8.3
Conservative hold		Swing		
Conservative hold		Swing		

Orchard (2)
Party	Candidate	Votes	%	±%
Liberal Democrats	Francis Oppler	540	22.1	
Liberal Democrats	David Biss	466	19.1	
BNP	Albert Bodle	292	12.0	
Conservative	Jill Ostler	277	11.3	
Conservative	Richard Ostler	259	10.6	
BNP	John Bullen	253	10.4	
Labour	Teresa Rich	184	7.5	
Labour	Jasper Richmond	170	7.0	
Turnout		2,441	30.2	+9.1
Liberal Democrats hold		Swing		
Liberal Democrats hold		Swing		

Pagham and Rose Green (3)
Party	Candidate	Votes	%	±%
Conservative	Leonard Brown	1,435	23.0	
Conservative	Dawn Hall	1,430	22.9	
Conservative	Ash Patel	1,274	20.4	
UKIP	Don Porter	508	8.1	
Liberal Democrats	Gregory Burt	430	6.9	
Liberal Democrats	Jason Passingham	400	6.4	
Labour	Anne-Marie Norman	289	4.6	
Labour	Jim Millar	256	4.1	
Labour	Paul Kottaun	215	3.4	
Turnout		6,237	37.9	+10.6
Conservative hold		Swing		
Conservative hold		Swing		
Conservative hold		Swing		

Pevensey (2)
Party	Candidate	Votes	%	±%
Conservative	Trevor Bence	451	16.4	
Conservative	Sandra Daniells	448	16.2	
Liberal Democrats	Robert Gillibrand	340	12.3	
Liberal Democrats	David Meagher	331	12.0	
BNP	Mike Witchell	311	11.3	
Labour	Jan Cosgrove	306	11.1	
BNP	Patricia Witchell	287	10.4	
Labour	Simon Holland	283	10.3	
Turnout		2,757	36.5	
Conservative hold		Swing		
Conservative gain from Labour		Swing		

River (2)
Party	Candidate	Votes	%	±%
Labour	Mark Butler	355	17.3	
Liberal Democrats	Ian Buckland	326	15.9	
Conservative	Laurence Forster	308	15.0	
Liberal Democrats	Anchorette Blackstone	294	14.3	
Labour	Wendy Squires	286	13.9	
UKIP	Norma Baker	173	8.4	
Independent	Annabell Alexander	126	6.1	
Independent	Jo Burton-Green	101	4.9	
Liberal	Bill Weights	83	4.0	
Turnout		2,052	31.2	+0.7
Labour hold		Swing		
Liberal Democrats gain from Labour		Swing		

Rustington East (2)
Party	Candidate	Votes	%	±%
Conservative	Graham Tyler	1,316	44.7	
Conservative	Philippa Bower	1,286	43.7	
Labour	Adrian Midgley	340	11.6	
Turnout		2,942	41.6	+7.8
Conservative hold		Swing		
Conservative hold		Swing		

Rustington West (3)
Party	Candidate	Votes	%	±%
Conservative	Florence Harrison	1,532	27.5	
Conservative	Michael Clayden	1,501	27.0	
Conservative	Raymond Steward	1,478	26.6	
UKIP	Janet Penn	659	11.9	
Labour	Tony Dines	391	7.0	
Turnout		5,561	38.3	+5.2
Conservative hold		Swing		
Conservative hold		Swing		
Conservative hold		Swing		

Walberton
Party	Candidate	Votes	%	±%
Conservative	Norman Dingemans	724	71.8	−0.5
Liberal Democrats	George Fletcher	190	18.8	−8.9
UKIP	Jimmy Dunning	94	9.3	+9.3
Majority		534	53.0	+8.4
Turnout		1,008	44.5	+4.7
Conservative hold		Swing		

Wick with Toddington (2)
Party	Candidate	Votes	%	±%
Conservative	June Caffyn	563	25.2	
Liberal Democrats	Dave Botting	444	19.9	
Liberal Democrats	David Jones	435	19.5	
Labour	George O'Neill	298	13.3	
Labour	Alan Butcher	296	13.2	
UKIP	Mary Lees	199	8.9	
Turnout		2,235	36.6	+6.8
Conservative gain from Labour		Swing		
Liberal Democrats gain from Labour		Swing		

Yapton (2)
Party	Candidate	Votes	%	±%
Conservative	Stephen Haymes	826	36.3	
Conservative	Christopher Forester	774	34.0	
Liberal Democrats	Jennifer Gillibrand	291	12.8	
Liberal Democrats	Stephen Field	162	7.1	
Labour	James Field	162	7.1	
Turnout		2,275	31.1	+3.1
Conservative hold		Swing		
Conservative hold		Swing		
