= List of electoral wards in West Sussex =

This is a list of electoral divisions and wards in the ceremonial county of West Sussex in South East England. All changes since the re-organisation of local government following the passing of the Local Government Act 1972 are shown. The number of councillors elected for each electoral division or ward is shown in brackets.

== County council ==
=== West Sussex ===
Electoral Divisions from 1 April 1974 (first election 12 April 1973) to 2 May 1985:

1. Arundel (1)
2. Bognor Regis No. 1 (Central) (1)
3. Bognor Regis No. 2 (Felpham) (1)
4. Bognor Regis No. 3 (South) (1)
5. Bognor Regis No. 4 (West & Pagham) (2)
6. Burgess Hill No. 1 (1)
7. Burgess Hill No. 2 (Town) (1)
8. Burgess Hill No. 3 (1)
9. Chanctonbury No. 1 (Henfield) (1)
10. Chanctonbury No. 2 (Pulborough) (1)
11. Chanctonbury No. 3 (Steyning) (1)
12. Chanctonbury No. 4 (1)
13. Charlwood & Horley (3)
14. Chichester (East) (1)
15. Chichester (South) (1)
16. Chichester (West) (1)
17. Chichester Rural No. 1 (1)
18. Chichester Rural No. 2 (1)
19. Chichester Rural No. 3 (1)
20. Chichester Rural No. 4 (1)
21. Chichester Rural No. 5 (1)
22. Chichester Rural No. 6 (1)
23. Chichester Rural No. 7 (1)
24. Crawley No. 1 (Pound Hill) (1)
25. Crawley No. 2 (Gossops Green) (1)
26. Crawley No. 3 (Ifield) (1)
27. Crawley No. 4 (Langley Green) (1)
28. Crawley No. 5 (Northgate & West Gre (1)
29. Crawley No. 6 (Southgate) (1)
30. Crawley No. 7 (Three Bridges) (1)
31. Crawley No. 8 (Tilgate) (1)
32. Cuckfield & Haywards Heath West (1)
33. Cuckfield Rural No. 1 (1)
34. Cuckfield Rural No. 2 (1)
35. Cuckfield Rural No. 3 (1)
36. Cuckfield Rural No. 4 (1)
37. Cuckfield Rural No. 5 (1)
38. East Grinstead (East) (1)
39. East Grinstead (West) (1)
40. Haywards Heath South (1)
41. Horsham (North) (1)
42. Horsham (South) (1)
43. Horsham (West) (1)
44. Horsham Rural No. 1 (1)
45. Horsham Rural No. 2 (1)
46. Horsham Rural No. 3 (1)
47. Horsham Rural No. 4 (1)
48. Lindfield & Haywards Heath East (1)
49. Littlehampton No. 1 (Beach) (1)
50. Littlehampton No. 2 (Wick) (1)
51. Littlehampton No. 3 (1)
52. Midhurst No. 1 (1)
53. Midhurst No. 2 (1)
54. Petworth No. 1 (1)
55. Petworth No. 2 (1)
56. Shoreham-by-Sea (East) (1)
57. Shoreham-by-Sea (North) (1)
58. Shoreham-by-Sea (South) (1)
59. Southwick (North) (1)
60. Southwick (South) (1)
61. Worthing (Broadwater) (1)
62. Worthing (Castle) (2)
63. Worthing (Central) (1)
64. Worthing (Durrington) (2)
65. Worthing (Goring) (1)
66. Worthing (Hearne) (1)
67. Worthing (Marine) (1)
68. Worthing (Offington) (2)
69. Worthing (Selden) (1)
70. Worthing (West Tarring) (1)
71. Worthing Rural No. 1 (Rustington) (1)
72. Worthing Rural No. 2 (Ferring) (1)
73. Worthing Rural No. 3 (1)
74. Worthing Rural No. 4 (1)
75. Worthing Rural No. 5 (Sompting) (1)
76. Worthing Rural No. 6 (2)

Electoral Divisions from 2 May 1985 to 5 May 2005:

1. Arun East (1)
2. Arundel & Angmering (1)
3. Bersted (1)
4. Bewbush (1)
5. Billingshurst (1)
6. Bognor Regis (1)
7. Bourne (1)
8. Broadfield (1)
9. Broadwater (1)
10. Burgess Hill Central (1)
11. Burgess Hill East (1)
12. Chichester East (1)
13. Chichester North (1)
14. Chichester South (1)
15. Chichester West (1)
16. Cissbury (1)
17. Cuckfield Rural (1)
18. Durrington (1)
19. East Grinstead East (1)
20. East Grinstead South (1)
21. East Worthing (1)
22. Felpham (1)
23. Fernhurst (1)
24. Fontwell (1)
25. Furnace Green (1)
26. Goring-by-Sea (1)
27. Gossops Green (1)
28. Hassocks & Burgess Hill W (1)
29. Haywards Heath East (1)
30. Haywards Heath West (1)
31. Henfield (1)
32. Holbrook (1)
33. Hotham (1)
34. Hurst (1)
35. Ifield (1)
36. Imberdown (1)
37. Kingston Buci (1)
38. Lancing (1)
39. Langley Green (1)
40. Lindfield (1)
41. Littlehampton North (1)
42. Littlehampton Town (1)
43. Maybridge (1)
44. Mid Sussex North (1)
45. Mid Sussex South (1)
46. Middleton (1)
47. Midhurst (1)
48. Northgate & Three Bridges (1)
49. Nyetimber (1)
50. Petworth (1)
51. Pound Hill (1)
52. Preston Manor (1)
53. Pulborough (1)
54. Richmond (1)
55. Riverside (1)
56. Roffey (1)
57. Rustington West (1)
58. Saltings (1)
59. Salvington (1)
60. Selsey & Sidlesham (1)
61. Shoreham (1)
62. Sompting (1)
63. Southwater (1)
64. Southwick (1)
65. Steyning (1)
66. Storrington (1)
67. The Witterings (1)
68. Tilgate (1)
69. Warnham (1)
70. West Parade (1)
71. West Tarring (1)

Electoral Divisions from 5 May 2005 to 4 June 2009:

1. Angmering & Findon (1)
2. Arundel & Wick (1)
3. Bersted (1)
4. Bewbush, Gossops Green & Southgate (2)
5. Billingshurst (1)
6. Bognor Regis East (1)
7. Bognor Regis West & Aldwick (1)
8. Bourne (1)
9. Bramber Castle (1)
10. Broadfield (1)
11. Burgess Hill (2)
12. Chichester East (1)
13. Chichester North (1)
14. Chichester South (1)
15. Chichester West (1)
16. Cuckfield & Lucastes (1)
17. East Grinstead (2)
18. East Preston & Ferring (1)
19. Felpham (1)
20. Fernhurst (1)
21. Fontwell (1)
22. Gaisford (2)
23. Goring & Northbrook (2)
24. Hassocks & Victoria (1)
25. Haywards Heath East (1)
26. Haywards Heath Town (1)
27. Henfield (1)
28. Holbrook (1)
29. Horsham Carfax (1)
30. Horsham Riverside (1)
31. Hurstpierpoint & Bolney (1)
32. Ifield, Langley Green & West Green (2)
33. Imberdown (1)
34. Kingston Buci (1)
35. Lancing (1)
36. Lindfield & High Weald (1)
37. Littlehampton East (1)
38. Littlehampton Town (1)
39. Middleton (1)
40. Midhurst (1)
41. Northgate & Three Bridges (1)
42. Nyetimber (1)
43. Petworth (1)
44. Pound Hill, Worth & Maidenbower (2)
45. Pulborough (1)
46. Roffey (1)
47. Rustington (1)
48. Saltings (1)
49. Salvington (2)
50. Selsey (1)
51. Shoreham (1)
52. Sompting (1)
53. Southwater & Nuthurst (1)
54. Southwick (1)
55. Storrington (1)
56. The Witterings (1)
57. Tilgate & Furnace Green (1)
58. Warnham & Rusper (1)
59. Worth Forest (1)
60. Worthing East (1)
61. Worthing Pier (1)
62. Worthing West (1)

Electoral Divisions from 4 June 2009 to 4 May 2017:

1. Angmering & Findon (1)
2. Arundel & Wick (1)
3. Bersted (1)
4. Bewbush & Ifield West (1)
5. Billingshurst (1) †
6. Bognor Regis East (1)
7. Bognor Regis West & Aldwick (1)
8. Bourne (1)
9. Bramber Castle (1)
10. Broadfield (1)
11. Broadwater (1)
12. Burgess Hill East (1)
13. Burgess Hill Town (1)
14. Chichester East (1)
15. Chichester North (1)
16. Chichester South (1)
17. Chichester West (1)
18. Cissbury (1)
19. Cuckfield & Lucastes (1)
20. Durrington & Salvington (1)
21. East Grinstead Meridian (1)
22. East Grinstead South & Ashurst Wood (1)
23. East Preston & Ferring (1)
24. Felpham (1)
25. Fernhurst (1)
26. Fontwell (1)
27. Goring (1)
28. Gossops Green & Ifield East (1)
29. Hassocks & Victoria (1)
30. Haywards Heath East (1)
31. Haywards Heath Town (1)
32. Henfield (1)
33. Holbrook (1)
34. Horsham Hurst (1)
35. Horsham Riverside (1)
36. Horsham Tanbridge & Broadbridge Heath (1)
37. Hurstpierpoint & Bolney (1)
38. Imberdown (1)
39. Kingston Buci (1)
40. Lancing (1)
41. Langley Green & West Green (1)
42. Lindfield & High Weald (1)
43. Littlehampton East (1)
44. Littlehampton Town (1)
45. Maidenbower (1)
46. Middleton (1)
47. Midhurst (1)
48. Northbrook (1)
49. Northgate & Three Bridges (1)
50. Nyetimber (1)
51. Petworth (1)
52. Pound Hill & Worth (1)
53. Pulborough (1)
54. Roffey (1)
55. Rustington (1)
56. Saltings (1)
57. Selsey (1)
58. Shoreham (1)
59. Sompting & North Lancing (1)
60. Southgate & Crawley Central (1)
61. Southwater & Nuthurst (1) †
62. Southwick (1)
63. Storrington (1)
64. Tarring (1)
65. The Witterings (1)
66. Tilgate & Furnace Green (1)
67. Warnham & Rusper (1)
68. Worth Forest (1)
69. Worthing East (1)
70. Worthing Pier (1)
71. Worthing West (1)

† minor boundary changes in 2017

Electoral Divisions from 4 May 2017 to present:

1. Angmering & Findon (1)
2. Arundel & Courtwick (1)
3. Bersted (1)
4. Bewbush & Ifield West (1)
5. Billingshurst (1)
6. Bognor Regis East (1)
7. Bognor Regis West & Aldwick (1)
8. Bourne (1)
9. Bramber Castle (1)
10. Broadbridge (1)
11. Broadfield (1)
12. Broadwater (1)
13. Burgess Hill East (1)
14. Burgess Hill North (1)
15. Chichester East (1)
16. Chichester North (1)
17. Chichester South (1)
18. Chichester West (1)
19. Cissbury (1)
20. Cuckfield & Lucastes (1)
21. Durrington & Salvington (1)
22. East Grinstead Meridian (1)
23. East Grinstead South & Ashurst Wood (1)
24. East Preston & Ferring (1)
25. Felpham (1)
26. Fontwell (1)
27. Goring (1)
28. Hassocks & Burgess Hill South (1)
29. Haywards Heath East (1)
30. Haywards Heath Town (1)
31. Henfield (1)
32. Holbrook (1)
33. Horsham East (1)
34. Horsham Hurst (1)
35. Horsham Riverside (1)
36. Hurstpierpoint & Bolney (1)
37. Imberdown (1)
38. Lancing (1)
39. Langley Green & Ifield East (1)
40. Lindfield & High Weald (1)
41. Littlehampton East (1)
42. Littlehampton Town (1)
43. Maidenbower & Worth (1)
44. Middleton (1)
45. Midhurst (1)
46. Northbrook (1)
47. Northgate & West Green (1)
48. Nyetimber (1)
49. Petworth (1)
50. Pound Hill (1)
51. Pulborough (1)
52. Rother Valley (1)
53. Rustington (1)
54. Selsey (1)
55. Shoreham North (1)
56. Shoreham South (1)
57. Sompting & North Lancing (1)
58. Southgate & Gossops Green (1)
59. Southwater & Nuthurst (1)
60. Southwick (1)
61. St Leonard’s Forest (1)
62. Storrington (1)
63. Tarring (1)
64. The Witterings (1)
65. Three Bridges (1)
66. Tilgate & Furnace Green (1)
67. Worth Forest (1)
68. Worthing East (1)
69. Worthing Pier (1)
70. Worthing West (1)

== District councils ==
=== Adur ===
Wards from 1 April 1974 (first election 7 June 1973) to 3 May 1979:

1. Lancing: East (4)
2. Lancing: North (4)
3. Lancing: West (4)
4. Marine (2)
5. Shoreham: Buckingham (2)
6. Shoreham: Kingston Buci (2)
7. Shoreham: Kingston St. Julians (2)
8. Shoreham: St. Marys (2)
9. Shoreham: St. Nicholas (2)
10. Sompting (5)
11. Southwick: Central (2)
12. Southwick: Fishersgate (2)
13. Southwick: North (2)
14. Southwick: South (1)
15. Southwick: West (2)

Wards from 3 May 1979 to 10 June 2004:

1. Buckingham (3)
2. Churchill (3)
3. Cokeham (3)
4. Eastbrook (3)
5. Hillside (3)
6. Manor (3)
7. Marine (2)
8. Mash Barn (3)
9. Peverel (3)
10. Southlands (3)
11. Southwick Green (3)
12. St. Marys (1)
13. St. Nicholas (3)
14. Widewater (3)

Wards from 10 June 2004 to present:

1. Buckingham (2)
2. Churchill (2)
3. Cokeham (2)
4. Eastbrook (2)
5. Hillside (2)
6. Manor (2)
7. Marine (2)
8. Mash Barn (2)
9. Peverel (2)
10. St Mary's (2)
11. St Nicolas (2)
12. Southlands (2)
13. Southwick Green (2)
14. Widewater (3)

=== Arun ===
Wards from 1 April 1974 (first election 7 June 1973) to 5 May 1983:

1. Aldingbourne (1)
2. Angmering (3)
3. Arundel (2)
4. Bersted (2)
5. Bognor Regis Central (3)
6. Bognor Regis East (3)
7. Bognor Regis Felpham (4)
8. Bognor Regis North (3)
9. Bognor Regis South (3)
10. Bognor Regis West (3)
11. Eastergate (2)
12. East Preston and Kingston (3)
13. Ferring (3)
14. Findon (1)
15. Littlehampton Beach (3)
16. Littlehampton Central-Ham-River (3)
17. Littlehampton Wick (4)
18. Lyminster (1)
19. Middleton-on-Sea (2)
20. Pagham (3)
21. Rustingtoná (5)
22. Tortington (1)
23. Walberton (1)
24. Yapton (1)

Wards from 5 May 1983 to 1 May 2003:

1. Aldingbourne (1)
2. Aldwick East (2)
3. Aldwick West (3)
4. Angmering (3)
5. Arundel (2)
6. Barnham (3)
7. Bersted (3)
8. East Preston with Kingston (3)
9. Felpham East (2)
10. Felpham West (2)
11. Ferring (2)
12. Findon (1)
13. Hotham (2)
14. Littlehampton Beach (2)
15. Littlehampton Central (2)
16. Littlehampton Ham (2)
17. Littlehampton River (1)
18. Littlehampton Wick (2)
19. Marine (2)
20. Middleton-on-Sea (2)
21. Orchard (2)
22. Pagham (3)
23. Pevensey (2)
24. Rustington East (2)
25. Rustington North (2)
26. Rustington South (2)
27. Walberton (1)

Wards from 1 May 2003 to 7 May 2015:

1. Aldwick East (2)
2. Aldwick West (2)
3. Angmering (3)
4. Arundel (2)
5. Barnham (3)
6. Beach (2)
7. Bersted (3)
8. Brookfield (2)
9. East Preston with Kingston (3)
10. Felpham East (2)
11. Felpham West (2)
12. Ferring (2)
13. Findon (1)
14. Ham (2)
15. Hotham (2)
16. Marine (2)
17. Middleton-on-Sea (2)
18. Orchard (2)
19. Pagham & Rose Green (3)
20. Pevensey (2)
21. River (2)
22. Rustington East (2)
23. Rustington West (3)
24. Walberton (1)
25. Wick with Toddington (2)
26. Yapton (2)

Wards from 7 May 2015 to present:

1. Aldwick East (2)
2. Aldwick West (2)
3. Angmering & Findon (3)
4. Arundel & Walberton (3)
5. Barnham (3)
6. Beach (2)
7. Bersted (3)
8. Brookfield (2)
9. Courtwick with Toddington (3)
10. East Preston (3)
11. Felpham East (2)
12. Felpham West (2)
13. Ferring (2)
14. Hotham (2)
15. Marine (2)
16. Middleton-on-Sea (2)
17. Orchard (2)
18. Pagham (2)
19. Pevensey (2)
20. River (3)
21. Rustington East (2)
22. Rustington West (3)
23. Yapton (2)

=== Chichester ===
Wards from 1 April 1974 (first election 7 June 1973) to 3 May 1979:

Wards from 3 May 1979 to 1 May 2003:

Wards from 1 May 2003 to 2 May 2019:

1. Bosham (2)
2. Boxgrove (1)
3. Bury (1)
4. Chichester East (3)
5. Chichester North (3)
6. Chichester South (3)
7. Chichester West (2)
8. Donnington (1)
9. Easebourne (1)
10. East Wittering (2)
11. Fernhurst (2)
12. Fishbourne (1)
13. Funtington (1)
14. Harting (1)
15. Lavant (1)
16. Midhurst (2)
17. North Mundham (1)
18. Petworth (2)
19. Plaistow (2)
20. Rogate (1)
21. Selsey North (3)
22. Selsey South (2)
23. Sidlesham (1)
24. Southbourne (3)
25. Stedham (1)
26. Tangmere (1)
27. Westbourne (1)
28. West Wittering (2)
29. Wisborough Green (1)

Wards from 2 May 2019 to present:

1. Chichester Central (1)
2. Chichester East (2)
3. Chichester North (2)
4. Chichester South (2)
5. Chichester West (2)
6. Easebourne (1)
7. Fernhurst (2)
8. Fittleworth (1)
9. Goodwood (1)
10. Harbour Villages (3)
11. Harting (1)
12. Lavant (1)
13. Loxwood (2)
14. Midhurst (2)
15. North Mundham & Tangmere (2)
16. Petworth (1)
17. Selsey South (2)
18. Sidlesham with Selsey North (2)
19. Southbourne (2)
20. The Witterings (3)
21. Westbourne (1)

=== Crawley ===
Wards from 1 April 1974 (first election 7 June 1973) to 3 May 1979:

1. Charlwood (1) †
2. Gossops Green (3)
3. Horley (6) †
4. Langley Green (3)
5. Northgate (2)
6. Pound Hill (3)
7. Southgate (4)
8. Three Bridges (3)
9. Tilgate (3)
10. West Green (2)

† Charlwood and Horley wards were moved to Surrey by the Charlwood and Horley Act 1974

Wards from 3 May 1979 to 5 May 1983:

1. Broadfield (2)
2. Furnace Green (2)
3. Gossops Green (2)
4. Ifield (2)
5. Langley Green (3)
6. Northgate (2)
7. Pound Hill (3)
8. Southgate (3)
9. Three Bridges (2)
10. Tilgate (3)
11. West Green (2)

Wards from 5 May 1983 to 10 June 2004:

1. Bewbush (2)
2. Broadfield (3)
3. Furnace Green (2)
4. Gossops Green (2)
5. Ifield (3)
6. Langley Green (3)
7. Northgate (2)
8. Pound Hill North (3)
9. Pound Hill South (2)
10. Southgate (3)
11. Three Bridges (2)
12. Tilgate (3)
13. West Green (2)

Wards from 10 June 2004 to 2 May 2019:

1. Bewbush (3)
2. Broadfield North (2)
3. Broadfield South (2)
4. Furnace Green (2)
5. Gossops Green (2)
6. Ifield (3)
7. Langley Green (3)
8. Maidenbower (3)
9. Northgate (2)
10. Pound Hill North (3)
11. Pound Hill South & Worth (3)
12. Southgate (3)
13. Three Bridges (2)
14. Tilgate (2)
15. West Green (2)

Wards from 2 May 2019 to present:

1. Bewbush & North Broadfield (3)
2. Broadfield (3)
3. Furnace Green (2)
4. Gossops Green & North East Broadfield (2)
5. Ifield (3)
6. Langley Green & Tushmore (3)
7. Maidenbower (3)
8. Northgate & West Green (3)
9. Pound Hill North & Forge Wood (3)
10. Pound Hill South & Worth (3)
11. Southgate (3)
12. Three Bridges (3)
13. Tilgate (2)

=== Horsham ===
Wards from 1 April 1974 (first election 7 June 1973) to 3 May 1979:

Wards from 3 May 1979 to 1 May 2003:

Wards from 1 May 2003 to 2 May 2019:

1. Billingshurst & Shipley (3) †
2. Bramber, Upper Beeding & Woodmancote (2)
3. Broadbridge Heath (1)
4. Chanctonbury (3)
5. Chantry (3)
6. Cowfold, Shermanbury & West Grinstead (2)
7. Denne (2)
8. Forest (1)
9. Henfield (2)
10. Holbrook East (2)
11. Holbrook West (2)
12. Horsham Park (3)
13. Itchingfield, Slinfold & Warnham (2)
14. Nuthurst (1)
15. Pulborough & Coldwatham (2)
16. Roffey North (2)
17. Roffey South (2)
18. Rudgwick (1)
19. Rusper & Colgate (1)
20. Southwater (3) †
21. Steyning (2)
22. Trafalgar (2)

† minor boundary changes in 2015

Wards from 2 May 2019 to present:

1. Billingshurst (3)
2. Bramber, Upper Beeding & Woodmancote (2)
3. Broadbridge Heath (2)
4. Colgate & Rusper (2)
5. Cowfold, Shermanbury & West Grinstead (2)
6. Denne (3)
7. Forest (3)
8. Henfield (2)
9. Holbrook East (2)
10. Holbrook West (2)
11. Itchingfield, Slinfold & Warnham (2)
12. Nuthurst & Lower Beeding (1)
13. Pulborough, Coldwaltham & Amberley (3)
14. Roffey North (2)
15. Roffey South (2)
16. Rudgwick (1)
17. Southwater North (2)
18. Southwater South & Shipley (2)
19. Steyning & Ashurst (2)
20. Storrington & Washington (3)
21. Trafalgar (2)
22. West Chiltington, Thakeham & Ashington (3)

=== Mid Sussex ===
Wards from 1 April 1974 (first election 7 June 1973) to 5 May 1983:

Wards from 5 May 1983 to 1 May 2003:

Wards from 1 May 2003 to 4 May 2023:

1. Ardingly & Balcombe (2)
2. Ashurst Wood (1)
3. Bolney (1)
4. Burgess Hill Dunstall (2)
5. Burgess Hill Franklands (2)
6. Burgess Hill Leylands (2)
7. Burgess Hill Meeds (2)
8. Burgess Hill St Andrews (2)
9. Burgess Hill Victoria (2)
10. Copthorne & Worth (2)
11. Crawley Down & Turners Hill (3)
12. Cuckfield (2)
13. East Grinstead Ashplats (2)
14. East Grinstead Baldwins (2)
15. East Grinstead Herontye (2)
16. East Grinstead Imberhorne (2)
17. East Grinstead Town (2)
18. Hassocks (3)
19. Haywards Heath Ashenground (2)
20. Haywards Heath Bentswood (2)
21. Haywards Heath Franklands (2)
22. Haywards Heath Heath (2)
23. Haywards Heath Lucastes (2)
24. High Weald (2)
25. Hurstpierpoint & Downs (3)
26. Lindfield (3)

Wards from 4 May 2023 to present:

1. Ardingly, Balcombe & Turners Hill (2)
2. Ashurst Wood & East Grinstead South (1)
3. Burgess Hill Dunstall (2)
4. Burgess Hill Franklands (2)
5. Burgess Hill Leylands (2)
6. Burgess Hill Meeds & Hammonds (2)
7. Burgess Hill St Andrews (2)
8. Burgess Hill Victoria (1)
9. Copthorne & Worth (2)
10. Crawley Down (2)
11. Cuckfield, Bolney & Ansty (2)
12. Downland Villages (1)
13. East Grinstead Ashplats (2)
14. East Grinstead Baldwins (1)
15. East Grinstead Herontye (1)
16. East Grinstead Imberhorne (2)
17. East Grinstead Town (2)
18. Handcross & Pease Pottage (1)
19. Hassocks (3)
20. Haywards Heath Ashenground (2)
21. Haywards Heath Bentswood & Heath (2)
22. Haywards Heath Franklands (2)
23. Haywards Heath Lucastes & Bolnore (2)
24. Haywards Heath North (1)
25. Hurstpierpoint (2)
26. Lindfield (2)
27. Lindfield Rural & High Weald (2)

=== Worthing ===
Wards from 1 April 1974 (first election 7 June 1973) to 5 May 1983:

Wards from 5 May 1983 to 10 June 2004:

Wards from 10 June 2004 to present:

1. Broadwater (3)
2. Castle (3)
3. Central (3)
4. Durrington (2)
5. Gaisford (3)
6. Goring (3)
7. Heene (3)
8. Marine (3)
9. Northbrook (2)
10. Offington (3)
11. Salvington (3)
12. Selden (3)
13. Tarring (3)

== Electoral wards by constituency ==
Wards as they existed on 1 December 2020.

=== Arundel and South Downs ===
Arun: Arundel & Walberton; Barnham; Felpham East (polling district BHOE).

Chichester: Easebourne; Fernhurst; Fittleworth; Goodwood (polling districts GWBX, GWEA, GWED, GWSI & GWUP); Harting; Loxwood; Midhurst; Petworth.

Horsham: Bramber, Upper Beeding & Woodmancote; Henfield; Pulborough, Coldwaltham & Amberley; Steyning & Ashurst; Storrington & Washington; West Chiltington, Thakeham & Ashington.

=== Bognor Regis and Littlehampton ===
Arun: Aldwick East; Aldwick West; Beach; Brookfield; Courtwick with Toddington; Felpham East (polling districts BFELE1, BFELE2, BFELE3 & BFELE4); Felpham West; Hotham; Marine; Middleton-on-Sea; Orchard; Pevensey; River; Rustington East; Rustington West; Yapton.

=== Chichester ===
Arun: Bersted; Pagham.

Chichester: Chichester Central; Chichester East; Chichester North; Chichester South; Chichester West; Goodwood (polling districts GWWD & GWWH); Harbour Villages; Lavant; North Mundham & Tangmere; Selsey South; Sidlesham with Selsey North; Southbourne; The Witterings; Westbourne.

=== Crawley ===
Crawley: Bewbush & North Broadfield; Broadfield; Furnace Green; Gossops Green & North East Broadfield; Ifield; Langley Green & Tushmore; Maidenbower; Northgate & West Green; Pound Hill North & Forge Wood; Pound Hill South & Worth; Southgate; Three Bridges; Tilgate.

=== East Grinstead and Uckfield (part) ===
Mid Sussex: Ardingly & Balcombe; Ashurst Wood; Copthorne & Worth; Crawley Down & Turners Hill; East Grinstead Ashplats; East Grinstead Baldwins; East Grinstead Herontye; East Grinstead Imberhorne; East Grinstead Town; High Weald.

=== East Worthing and Shoreham ===
Adur: Buckingham; Churchill; Cokeham; Eastbrook; Hillside; Manor; Marine; Mash Barn; Peverel; St Mary's; St Nicolas; Southlands; Southwick Green; Widewater.

Worthing: Broadwater; Gaisford; Offington; Selden.

=== Horsham ===
Horsham: Billingshurst; Broadbridge Heath; Colgate & Rusper; Cowfold, Shermanbury & West Grinstead; Denne; Forest; Holbrook East; Holbrook West; Itchingfield, Slinfold & Warnham; Nuthurst & Lower Beeding; Roffey North; Roffey South; Rudgwick; Southwater North; Southwater South & Shipley; Trafalgar.

=== Mid Sussex ===
Mid Sussex: Bolney; Burgess Hill Dunstall; Burgess Hill Franklands; Burgess Hill Leylands; Burgess Hill Meeds; Burgess Hill St. Andrews; Burgess Hill Victoria; Cuckfield; Hassocks; Haywards Heath Ashenground; Haywards Heath Bentswood; Haywards Heath Franklands; Haywards Heath Heath; Haywards Heath Lucastes; Hurstpierpoint & Downs; Lindfield.

=== Worthing West ===
Arun: Angmering & Findon; East Preston; Ferring.

Worthing: Castle; Central; Durrington; Goring; Heene; Marine; Northbrook; Salvington; Tarring.

== See also ==
- List of parliamentary constituencies in West Sussex
- List of electoral divisions in West Sussex 2009
