= 1999 Arun District Council election =

1999 UK local government election

The 1999 Arun District Council election took place on 6 May 1999 to elect members of Arun District Council in West Sussex, England. The whole council was up for election and the Conservative Party held overall control of the council.

== Election result ==
Arun local election result 1999
Party	Seats	Gains	Losses	Net gain/loss	Seats %	Votes %	Votes	+/−
Conservative	36			+6	64.3	50.3	35,876	
Liberal Democrats	10			-4	17.9	27.5	19,591	
Labour	8			-2	14.3	18.1	12,900	
Independent	2			0	3.6	4.1	2,953	

== Ward results ==
Aldingbourne
Party	Candidate	Votes	%	±%
Conservative	Richard Wilby	642	66.7	+15.8
Liberal Democrats	George Fletcher	321	33.3	+4.9
Majority		321	33.3	+10.8
Turnout		963	34.9	+0.9
Conservative hold		Swing		

Aldwick East (2)
Party	Candidate	Votes	%	±%
Conservative	Gillian Brown	1,127		
Conservative	Robin Brown	1,127		
Liberal Democrats	Gerard Maloret	311		
Liberal Democrats	Joan Maloret	289		
Labour	Christopher Rodway	202		
Labour	Mary Vick	195		
Turnout		3,251	37.4	

Aldwick West (3)
Party	Candidate	Votes	%	±%
Conservative	Richard Dickinson	1,000		
Conservative	Brian Dodd	995		
Conservative	Jacqueline Maconachie	916		
Liberal Democrats	Anthony Thorpe	290		
Liberal Democrats	Patricia Elliott	288		
Liberal Democrats	Carol Turner	275		
Labour	Bernadette Jones	252		
Labour	Brian Picton	237		
Labour	Colin White	228		
Turnout		4,481	31.2	

Angmering (3)
Party	Candidate	Votes	%	±%
Conservative	Victor Barnard	1,048		
Conservative	Roger Elkins	918		
Conservative	Oliver Wingrove	856		
Liberal Democrats	Ann Franke	428		
Labour	David Jones	394		
Turnout		3,644	29.0	

Arundel (2)
Party	Candidate	Votes	%	±%
Independent	William Redman	933		
Conservative	Clive Gardner	790		
Liberal Democrats	Ivan Olney	543		
Turnout		2,266	43.0	

Barnham (3)
Party	Candidate	Votes	%	±%
Conservative	Jean Goad	1,193		
Liberal Democrats	John Matthews	951		
Conservative	David Hodgson	935		
Conservative	Martin Porsch	842		
Liberal Democrats	Julia Robson	721		
Liberal Democrats	John Goss	649		
Labour	Jill Etienne	370		
Labour	Peter Found	363		
Labour	Philippa Holliday	340		
Turnout		6,364	33.4	

Bersted (3)
Party	Candidate	Votes	%	±%
Liberal Democrats	Simon McDougall	618		
Liberal Democrats	Paul Beckerson	578		
Liberal Democrats	Martin Lury	549		
Labour	Patrick Hastings	474		
Conservative	John Potter	446		
Labour	Tiggy Ayoub	413		
Labour	Robert Shields	370		
Turnout		3,448	23.8	

East Preston and Kingston (3)
Party	Candidate	Votes	%	±%
Conservative	John Rankin	1,380		
Conservative	Dennis Wilde	1,362		
Conservative	Ronald Sands	1,268		
Liberal Democrats	Susan Graves	524		
Liberal Democrats	Leonard Lee	506		
Turnout		5,040	36.4	

Felpham East (2)
Party	Candidate	Votes	%	±%
Conservative	Susan Kelly	733		
Independent	Michael Harvey	561		
Conservative	David Crabtree	555		
Liberal Democrats	William Robinson	203		
Labour	Alison McIsaac	202		
Labour	Scott Cowie	196		
Liberal Democrats	Christopher Oliver	151		
Turnout		2,601	33.8	

Felpham West (2)
Party	Candidate	Votes	%	±%
Conservative	Alan Stainton	632		
Conservative	Elaine Stainton	545		
Independent	Mary Harvey	515		
Independent	George Stride	497		
Liberal Democrats	Sylvia Orwell	142		
Labour	Mark Searle	132		
Labour	Melanie Webb	96		
Liberal Democrats	Walter Vanner	80		
Turnout		2,639	38.8	

Ferring (2)
Party	Candidate	Votes	%	±%
Conservative	Rosemary Cooper	1,224		
Conservative	David Hill	1,205		
Liberal Democrats	John Ceiriog-Hughes	300		
Liberal Democrats	Penelope Kane	286		
Turnout		3,015	40.4	

Findon
Party	Candidate	Votes	%	±%
Conservative	Stephen Brookman	449	67.9	
Liberal Democrats	Margaret Monroe	212	32.1	
Majority		237	35.8	
Turnout		661	46.0	

Hotham (2)
Party	Candidate	Votes	%	±%
Conservative	Edwin Gyde	490		
Conservative	Michael May	479		
Labour	Pauline Nash	349		
Liberal Democrats	Roslyn Kissell	348		
Liberal Democrats	Jeanette Warr	321		
Labour	Edward Walsh	318		
Turnout		2,305	27.0	

Littlehampton Beach (2)
Party	Candidate	Votes	%	±%
Liberal Democrats	James Walsh	607		
Conservative	Richard Bower	456		
Liberal Democrats	Richard James	454		
Conservative	Philippa Bower	440		
Independent	Andrew Hawkes	299		
Labour	Edward Nattrass	221		
Labour	William Taylor	219		
Turnout		2,696	32.9	

Littlehampton Central (2)
Party	Candidate	Votes	%	±%
Conservative	Nigel Peters	576		
Labour	David Dyball	526		
Labour	Alan Butcher	510		
Liberal Democrats	Barbara Roberts	391		
Liberal Democrats	Mark Foster	372		
Turnout		2,375	30.7	

Littlehampton Ham (2)
Party	Candidate	Votes	%	±%
Labour	Michael Northeast	472		
Labour	Anthony Squires	465		
Liberal Democrats	Alfred Roberts	178		
Conservative	Linda Rudd	171		
Liberal Democrats	Paul Graydon	163		
Turnout		1,449	28.0	

Littlehampton River
Party	Candidate	Votes	%	±%
Labour	Mark Butler	350	46.9	
Conservative	Anthony Williamson	206	27.6	
Liberal Democrats	Nicholas Wiltshire	190	25.5	
Majority		144	19.3	
Turnout		746	31.8	

Littlehampton Wick (2)
Party	Candidate	Votes	%	±%
Labour	George O'Neill	685		
Labour	Andrew Northeast	681		
Conservative	John Forster	412		
Liberal Democrats	John Wedderburn	247		
Liberal Democrats	Alan Escolme	184		
Turnout		2,209	30.8	

Marine (2)
Party	Candidate	Votes	%	±%
Conservative	Douglas Maconachie	566		
Liberal Democrats	Kenneth Scutt	524		
Liberal Democrats	Sylvia Olliver	512		
Labour	Jeremy Tomlinson	259		
Labour	Thomas Wise	212		
Turnout		2,073	29.1	

Middleton-on-Sea (2)
Party	Candidate	Votes	%	±%
Conservative	Barbara Oakley	971		
Conservative	Paul Wotherspoon	922		
Labour	Priscilla Matcham	256		
Labour	Robert Ling	222		
Liberal Democrats	Christine Beckerson	209		
Liberal Democrats	Frank Coe	184		
Independent	Colin Mansfield	148		
Turnout		2,912	33.9	

Orchard (2)
Party	Candidate	Votes	%	±%
Liberal Democrats	Catherine Morrish	454		
Liberal Democrats	Francis Oppler	390		
Labour	Ian McIsaac	373		
Labour	Gail Walker	356		
Conservative	Doris May	154		
Turnout		1,727	28.7	

Pagham (3)
Party	Candidate	Votes	%	±%
Conservative	Anita Hall	869		
Conservative	Leonard Brown	849		
Conservative	Ashvinkumar Patel	777		
Labour	Sean Whelan	332		
Labour	Simon Holland	315		
Labour	Michael Jones	297		
Liberal Democrats	Guy Beesley	256		
Liberal Democrats	Sara Allen	252		
Liberal Democrats	Paul Wells	225		
Turnout		4,172	31.5	

Pevensey (2)
Party	Candidate	Votes	%	±%
Labour	Roger Nash	539		
Labour	Jan Cosgrove	479		
Liberal Democrats	Jennifer Gillibrand	315		
Liberal Democrats	Robert Gillibrand	300		
Conservative	Luke Parker	244		
Turnout		1,877	27.9	

Rustington East (2)
Party	Candidate	Votes	%	±%
Conservative	Derek Whittaker	1,057		
Conservative	Frances Drazny	1,017		
Liberal Democrats	Allan Turner	466		
Liberal Democrats	George Young	433		
Turnout		2,967	37.0	

Rustington North (2)
Party	Candidate	Votes	%	±%
Liberal Democrats	Val Capon	624		
Liberal Democrats	John Richards	578		
Conservative	Alan Gammon	484		
Conservative	Dee Giles	479		
Turnout		2,165	33.9	

Rustington South (2)
Party	Candidate	Votes	%	±%
Conservative	Thomas Harrison	699		
Conservative	Harold Parris	665		
Liberal Democrats	Peter Gladston	510		
Liberal Democrats	Graham Trickett	437		
Turnout		2,311	38.8	

Walberton
Party	Candidate	Votes	%	±%
Conservative	Norman Dingemans	705	73.7	
Liberal Democrats	Kevin Welling	252	26.3	
Majority		453	47.4	
Turnout		957	43.0	
