= 2011 Arun District Council election =

2011 UK local government election

Map of results of 2011 election

Elections to Arun District Council were held on Thursday 5 May 2011 to elect members to the council.

The incumbent Conservative administration won an 11th election in a row, capitalising on a poor national performance by the Liberal Democrats by gaining five of their seats - Bognor Reigs Hotham, Bognor Reigs Orchard, Littlehampton Beach, Littlehampton River and Wick with Toddington, as well as gaining one previously held by an independent member in Bersted. The Conservatives also gained one seat, Littlehampton River, from Labour, but this was offset by Labour gaining Bognor Regis Pevensey from the Conservatives.

== Election result ==
Arun local election result 2011
Party	Seats	Gains	Losses	Net gain/loss	Seats %	Votes %	Votes	+/−
Conservative	48	7	1	+6	85.7	61.2	58,646	+1.4%
Liberal Democrats	4	0	5	-5	7.1	17.7	16,926	-0.5%
Labour	3	1	1	0	5.4	12.7	12,146	+2.2%
Independent	1	0	1	-1	1.8	2.5	2,371	-2.4%
UKIP	0	0	0	0	0.00	4.9	4,683	+0.2%
BNP	0	0	0	0	0.00	0.9	821	-0.6%
Liberal	0	0	0	0	0.00	0.3	298	-0.3%

== Ward results ==
Aldwick East (2)
Party	Candidate	Votes	%	±%
Conservative	Gillian Brown	1,310	33.0	+0.6
Conservative	Robin Brown	1,226	30.9	+1.7
Liberal Democrats	William Toovey	320	8.1	+8.1
Liberal Democrats	Darrell Hardy	302	7.6	+7.6
UKIP	Thomas Collier	283	7.1	−1.4
Independent	Stella Coppard	268	6.7	+6.7
Labour	Richard Dawson	264	6.6	+1.7
Turnout		3,973	53.0	+7.7
Conservative hold		Swing		
Conservative hold		Swing		

Aldwick West (2)
Party	Candidate	Votes	%	±%
Conservative	Phil Hitchens	1,506	41.1	+4.0
Conservative	Jacqui Maconachie	1,305	35.6	+3.0
Liberal Democrats	Peter Lee	443	12.1	−3.9
Liberal Democrats	Gary Smith	410	11.2	−3.2
Turnout		3,664	51.9	+8.8
Conservative hold		Swing		
Conservative hold		Swing		

Angmering (3)
Party	Candidate	Votes	%	±%
Conservative	Paul Bicknell	1,520	23.8	−6.8
Conservative	Julie Hazlehurst	1,404	22.0	−7.2
Conservative	Dudley Wensley	1,324	20.8	−5.5
Liberal Democrats	Craig Bichard	550	8.6	+8.6
Labour	Peter Slowe	538	8.4	+8.4
Independent	Don Harris	524	8.2	+8.2
UKIP	Julia Longhurst	517	8.1	−5.7
Turnout		6,377	44.8	+11.3
Conservative hold		Swing		
Conservative hold		Swing		
Conservative hold		Swing		

Arundel (2)
Party	Candidate	Votes	%	±%
Conservative	Don Ayling	1,006	31.8	N/A
Conservative	Paul Dendle	987	31.2	N/A
Independent	Peter Moss	475	15.0	N/A
Labour	Julie Buckle	347	11.0	N/A
Liberal Democrats	John Wedderburn	198	6.3	N/A
Liberal Democrats	Carol Vanner	148	4.7	N/A
Turnout		3,161	51.3	N/A
Conservative hold		Swing		
Conservative hold		Swing		

Barnham (3)
Party	Candidate	Votes	%	±%
Conservative	Jean Goad	2,012	27.9	−3.6
Conservative	John Charles	1,699	23.6	−7.5
Conservative	Dougal Maconachie	1,415	19.7	−3.0
Liberal Democrats	Graham Parvin	691	9.6	−5.0
Liberal Democrats	Anchorette Parvin-Blackstone	597	8.3	−6.3
UKIP	Tricia Wales	543	7.5	+7.5
BNP	John Robinson	244	3.4	+3.4
Turnout		7,201	44.0	+9.6
Conservative hold		Swing		
Conservative hold		Swing		
Conservative hold		Swing		

Beach (2)
Party	Candidate	Votes	%	±%
Liberal Democrats	Dr James Walsh	746	22.5	−11.4
Conservative	Emma Neno	732	22.0	−3.1
Conservative	Jill Long	593	17.9	−7.2
Liberal Democrats	Nick Wiltshire	575	17.3	−10.9
Labour	Monica Dibble	232	7.0	+1.6
UKIP	Brian Dawe	230	6.9	−0.6
Labour	Derek Lansdale	214	6.4	+1.0
Turnout		3,382	46.8	+2.5
Liberal Democrats hold		Swing		
Conservative gain from Liberal Democrats		Swing		

Bersted (3)
Party	Candidate	Votes	%	±%
Conservative	Ann Smee	833	17.0	−3.5
Conservative	Adam Cunard	820	16.7	−3.8
Liberal Democrats	Simon McDougall	776	15.8	−3.7
Liberal Democrats	Martin Lury	668	13.6	−3.2
Liberal Democrats	Berni Millam	498	10.1	−3.5
UKIP	Ann Rapnik	479	9.7	+9.7
Labour	Ian McIsacc	434	8.8	+2.2
Labour	Michelle White	405	8.2	+2.1
Turnout		4,913	36.4	+3.8
Conservative hold		Swing		
Conservative gain from Independent		Swing		
Liberal Democrats hold		Swing		

Brookfield (2)
Party	Candidate	Votes	%	±%
Conservative	Joyce Bowyer	718	24.5	+2.6
Conservative	Alan Gammon	651	22.2	+1.4
Liberal Democrats	Jamie Bennett	377	12.8	−3.0
Liberal Democrats	Richard Edwards	315	10.7	−4.4
Labour	Peter Henry	315	10.7	−0.7
UKIP	Robert East	286	9.7	+3.2
Labour	Stephen McConnell	274	9.3	+0.9
Turnout		2,936	37.6	+6.5
Conservative hold		Swing		
Conservative hold		Swing		

East Preston with Kingston (3)
Party	Candidate	Votes	%	±%
Conservative	Ricky Bower	2,005	29.2	+4.6
Conservative	Terry Chapman	1,902	27.7	+3.5
Conservative	Dennis Wilde	1,795	26.1	+4.1
Liberal Democrats	George Schlich	628	9.1	+9.1
Labour	Michael Brown	539	7.8	+2.7
Turnout		6,869	47.9	+5.1
Conservative hold		Swing		
Conservative hold		Swing		
Conservative hold		Swing		

Felpham East (2)
Party	Candidate	Votes	%	±%
Conservative	Paul English	1,283	41.0	−2.9
Conservative	John Holman	1,133	36.2	−4.0
Labour	Claire Jones	280	8.9	+8.9
Liberal Democrats	Alan Gale	220	7.0	−8.8
Liberal Democrats	Adrian Thorpe	213	6.8	−9.0
Turnout		3,129	47.4	+11.6
Conservative hold		Swing		
Conservative hold		Swing		

Felpham West (2)
Party	Candidate	Votes	%	±%
Conservative	Gill Madeley	1,077	33.8	+4.7
Conservative	Elaine Stainton	970	30.4	+4.3
UKIP	George Stride	407	12.8	+0.8
Liberal Democrats	Roslyn Kissell	298	9.4	−2.5
Labour	Richard Sampford	252	7.9	+7.9
Liberal Democrats	Michelle Hibbert	182	5.7	N/A
Turnout		3,186	26.7	−12.0
Conservative hold		Swing		
Conservative hold		Swing		

Ferring (2)
Party	Candidate	Votes	%	±%
Conservative	Roger Elkins	1,597	38.4	−5.6
Conservative	Colin Oliver-Redgate	1,491	35.8	−5.0
Labour	Ed Miller	594	14.3	−0.9
Labour	Steve O'Donnell	478	11.5	+11.5
Turnout		4,160	57.4	+7.1
Conservative hold		Swing		
Conservative hold		Swing		

Findon
Party	Candidate	Votes	%	±%
Conservative	Peter Jones	682	65.2	N/A
UKIP	Mark Weaver	183	17.5	N/A
Liberal Democrats	Margaret Boulton	181	17.3	N/A
Turnout		1,046	50.0	N/A
Conservative hold		Swing		

Ham (2)
Party	Candidate	Votes	%	±%
Labour	Mike Northeast	494	20.5	−0.8
Labour	Tony Squires	494	20.5	−3.6
Conservative	Marian Ayres	427	17.7	N/A
Conservative	Delma Mayer-Pezhanzki	313	13.0	−5.2
Liberal Democrats	Dave Leggatt	204	8.5	−8.9
UKIP	Shirley Western	169	7.0	+7.0
Liberal Democrats	Daniel Purchese	112	4.7	N/A
Liberal	Jenny Weights	110	4.6	−14.3
Liberal	Bill Weights	85	3.5	N/A
Turnout		2,408	36.6	+8.3
Labour hold		Swing		
Labour hold		Swing		

Hotham (2)
Party	Candidate	Votes	%	±%
Liberal Democrats	Jeanette Warr	534	20.9	−1.1
Conservative	David Edwards	529	20.7	+3.3
Liberal Democrats	Paul Wells	502	19.7	−2.7
Conservative	Stephen Reynolds	438	17.2	−0.2
Labour	Michael Jones	246	9.6	−0.8
Labour	Paul Makinson	198	7.8	−2.6
BNP	Patrick Radbourne	106	4.2	+4.2
Turnout		2,553	36.8	+2.2
Liberal Democrats hold		Swing		
Conservative gain from Liberal Democrats		Swing		

Marine (2)
Party	Candidate	Votes	%	±%
Independent	Jim Brooks	605	29.4	+9.4
Conservative	Andrew Evans	539	26.2	+6.5
Liberal Democrats	David Meagher	271	13.2	−1.9
Liberal Democrats	Stephen Kerrigan	253	12.3	−1.5
Labour	Adam Vernone	252	12.3	+12.3
BNP	Gloria Mowatt	136	6.6	+6.6
Turnout		2,056	37.1	+6.6
Independent hold		Swing		
Conservative hold		Swing		

Middleton-on-Sea (2)
Party	Candidate	Votes	%	±%
Conservative	Barbara Oakley	1,274	36.8	−3.7
Conservative	Paul Wotherspoon	1,127	32.5	−8.0
UKIP	Joan Phillips	397	11.5	+11.5
Labour	Eddie Walsh	298	8.6	+3.9
Liberal Democrats	Daniel Hutchinson	188	5.4	−4.3
Liberal Democrats	Mark Foster	180	5.2	N/A
Turnout		3,464	49.9	+7.8
Conservative hold		Swing		
Conservative hold		Swing		

Orchard (2)
Party	Candidate	Votes	%	±%
Liberal Democrats	Francis Oppler	617	27.1	+5.0
Conservative	Sandra Daniells	447	19.6	+8.3
Liberal Democrats	David Biss	437	19.2	+0.1
Labour	Jan Cosgrove	330	13.5	+6.5
Labour	Simon Mouatt	270	11.9	+4.9
BNP	Albert Bodle	175	7.7	−4.3
Turnout		2,276	34.2	+4.0
Liberal Democrats hold		Swing		
Conservative gain from Liberal Democrats		Swing		

Pagham and Rose Green (3)
Party	Candidate	Votes	%	±%
Conservative	Len Brown	1,523	24.2	+1.2
Conservative	Dawn Hall	1,405	22.3	−0.6
Conservative	Ash Patel	1,275	20.3	−0.1
UKIP	Janet Taylor	503	8.0	−0.1
Labour	Pauline Nash	488	7.8	+3.2
Independent	Sue Harris	318	5.1	+5.1
Liberal Democrats	Gregory Burt	292	4.6	−2.3
Liberal Democrats	Jason Passingham	255	4.1	−2.3
Liberal Democrats	Andrew Skinner	237	3.8	N/A
Turnout		6,296	44.5	+7.6
Conservative hold		Swing		
Conservative hold		Swing		
Conservative hold		Swing		

Pevensey (2)
Party	Candidate	Votes	%	±%
Conservative	Trevor Bence	511	18.9	+2.5
Labour	Roger Nash	470	17.4	+6.3
Conservative	Bill Smee	458	17.0	+0.8
Labour	Simon Holland	421	15.6	+5.3
Liberal Democrats	Kim Davis	366	13.6	+1.3
Liberal Democrats	Steve White	312	11.6	−0.4
BNP	Mike Witchell	160	5.9	−5.4
Turnout		2,698	39.7	+3.2
Conservative hold		Swing		
Labour gain from Conservative		Swing		

River (2)
Party	Candidate	Votes	%	±%
Conservative	David Britton	444	18.8	+3.8
Conservative	Jacky Pendleton	385	16.3	N/A
Labour	George O'Neill	348	14.7	−2.6
Liberal Democrats	Ian Buckland	325	13.8	−2.1
Labour	Daniel Goddard	293	12.4	−1.5
Liberal Democrats	Mark Steeles	197	8.3	−6.0
UKIP	Mary Lees	190	8.0	−0.4
Independent	CK Alexander	181	7.7	N/A
Turnout		2,636	37.8	+6.6
Conservative gain from Labour		Swing		
Conservative gain from Liberal Democrats		Swing		

Rustington East (2)
Party	Candidate	Votes	%	±%
Conservative	Graham Tyler	1,402	38.9	−5.8
Conservative	Philippa Bower	1,392	38.6	−5.1
Liberal Democrats	John Richards	416	11.5	+11.5
Labour	Tony Dines	398	11.0	−0.6
Turnout		3,608	48.9	+7.3
Conservative hold		Swing		
Conservative hold		Swing		

Rustington West (3)
Party	Candidate	Votes	%	±%
Conservative	Florence Harrison	2,014	28.3	+0.8
Conservative	Mike Clayden	1,950	27.4	+0.4
Conservative	Ray Steward	1,632	22.9	−3.7
Liberal Democrats	Val Capon	806	11.3	+11.3
Labour	Adrian Midgley	714	10.0	+3.0
Turnout		7,116	47.2	+8.9
Conservative hold		Swing		
Conservative hold		Swing		
Conservative hold		Swing		

Walberton
Party	Candidate	Votes	%	±%
Conservative	Norman Dingemans	826	67.6	−4.2
Liberal Democrats	Alan Fletcher	219	17.9	−0.9
UKIP	Jeannie Dunning	176	14.4	+5.1
Turnout		1,221	54.2	+9.7
Conservative hold		Swing		

Wick with Toddington (2)
Party	Candidate	Votes	%	±%
Conservative	June Caffyn	780	26.0	+0.8
Conservative	Carol Emberson	690	23.0	N/A
Labour	Alan Butcher	453	15.1	+1.8
Labour	Bill Mears	407	13.6	+0.4
Liberal Democrats	Dave Botting	327	11.0	−8.9
Liberal Democrats	David Jones	240	8.0	−11.5
Liberal	Elliott Weights	103	3.4	N/A
Turnout		3,000	39.1	+2.5
Conservative hold		Swing		
Conservative gain from Liberal Democrats		Swing		

Yapton (2)
Party	Candidate	Votes	%	±%
Conservative	Stephen Haymes	1,050	36.3	0.0
Conservative	Angus Mcintyre	819	28.3	−5.7
Labour	Alice Jackson	406	14.0	+6.9
UKIP	Derek Ambler	320	11.1	+11.1
Liberal Democrats	Barbara Roberts	300	10.4	−2.4
Turnout		2,895	41.3	
Conservative hold		Swing		
Conservative hold		Swing		
