= 2019 Arun District Council election =

2019 District council election in England

- 2 May 2019

All 54 council seats 28 seats needed for a majority
	First party	Second party	Third party
Party	Liberal Democrats	Conservative	Independent
Last election	5 seats, 13.7%	42 seats, 41.6%	2 seats, 7.7%
Seats won	22	21	8
Seat change	▲17	▼21	▲6
Popular vote	26,169	35,786	7,837
Percentage	31.0%	42.3%	9.3%
Swing	▲16.3%	▲0.7%	▲1.6%
	Fourth party	Fifth party	Sixth party
Party	Green	Labour	UKIP
Last election	0 seats, 3.6%	1 seats, 10.9%	4 seats, 22.5%
Seats won	2	1	0
Seat change	▲2	Steady	▼4
Popular vote	2,559	9,846	2,335
Percentage	3.0%	11.6%	2.8%
Swing	▼0.6%	▲0.7%	▼19.7%
- Winner of each seat at the 2019 Arun District Council election
Largest Party before election
Conservative Party
Subsequent Largest Party
Liberal Democrats

The 2019 Arun District Council election took place on Thursday 2 May 2019, electing all 54 members of Arun District Council, and taking place alongside the other local elections in England and Northern Ireland.

== Summary ==
=== Election result ===
2019 Arun District Council election
Party	Candidates	Seats	Gains	Losses	Net gain/loss	Seats %	Votes %	Votes	+/−
Liberal Democrats	41	22	17	0	▲17	40.7	31.0	26,169	+16.3
Conservative	51	21	1	22	▼21	38.9	42.3	35,786	+0.7
Independent	10	8	6	0	▲6	14.8	9.3	7,837	+1.6
Green	6	2	2	0	▲2	3.7	3.0	2,559	–0.6
Labour	38	1	0	0	Steady	1.9	11.6	9,846	+0.7
UKIP	8	0	0	4	▼4	0.0	2.8	2,335	–19.7

== Ward results ==
=== Aldwick East ===
Aldwick East (2 seats)
Party	Candidate	Votes	%	±%
Independent	Anthony Dixon	1,089	56.0	New
Independent	Hugh Coster	1,086	55.8	New
Conservative	Trevor Bence*	789	40.5	
Conservative	Gillian Brown*	742	38.1	
Majority				
Turnout		1,971	43.6	
Rejected ballots		25		
Registered electors		4,523		
Independent gain from Conservative		Swing		
Independent gain from Conservative		Swing		

=== Aldwick West ===
Aldwick West (2 seats)
Party	Candidate	Votes	%	±%
Liberal Democrats	Martin Smith*	722	39.0	
Liberal Democrats	Claire Needs	595	32.1	
Conservative	Caroline Spencer	552	29.8	
Conservative	David Gerrie	529	28.6	
UKIP	Matilda Watson	382	20.6	
Green	Carol Birch	274	14.8	New
Labour	Ian Manion	156	8.4	New
Labour	Lynne Armstrong Lilley	121	6.5	New
Majority				
Turnout		1,863	36.1	
Rejected ballots		12		
Registered electors		5,159		
Liberal Democrats gain from Conservative		Swing		
Liberal Democrats gain from Conservative		Swing		

Martin Smith was previously elected at a by-election, gaining one of the Conservative seats.

=== Angmering & Findon ===
Angmering & Findon (3 seats)
Party	Candidate	Votes	%	±%
Conservative	Paul Bicknell*	1,405	56.4	
Conservative	Andrew Cooper*	1,177	47.3	
Conservative	Michael Clayden	1,168	46.9	
Liberal Democrats	John Richards	760	30.5	
Liberal Democrats	George Schlich	680	27.3	
Labour	Alison Baker	539	21.6	
UKIP	Jean Dunning	450	18.1	
Majority				
Turnout		2,520	32.0	
Rejected ballots		30		
Registered electors		7,875		
Conservative hold		Swing		
Conservative hold		Swing		
Conservative hold		Swing		

=== Arundel & Walberton ===
Arundel & Walberton (3 seats)
Party	Candidate	Votes	%	±%
Conservative	Steven Dendle*	1,088	47.9	
Conservative	Grant Roberts	923	40.6	
Green	Faye Catterson	884	38.9	New
Conservative	Robert Wheal*	852	37.5	
Liberal Democrats	Gilbert Cockburn	642	28.2	New
Liberal Democrats	Paul Graydon	546	24.0	New
Labour	Michael Ward	423	18.6	
UKIP	Elizabeth Wallace	388	17.1	
Majority				
Turnout		2,293	34.6	
Rejected ballots		20		
Registered electors		6,626		
Conservative hold		Swing		
Conservative hold		Swing		
Green gain from Conservative		Swing		

=== Barnham ===
Barnham (3 seats)
Party	Candidate	Votes	%	±%
Conservative	Christopher Hughes*	932	50.1	
Green	Isabel Thurston	822	44.1	
Conservative	John Charles*	753	40.4	
Conservative	Laurence Wilshere	659	35.4	
Liberal Democrats	Michael Chapman	654	35.1	New
Liberal Democrats	Adrian Thorpe	498	26.7	New
Labour	Kristian Vill	400	21.5	
Majority				
Turnout		1,912	28.9	
Rejected ballots		50		
Registered electors		6,609		
Conservative hold		Swing		
Green gain from Conservative		Swing		
Conservative hold		Swing		

=== Beach ===
Beach (2 seats)
Party	Candidate	Votes	%	±%
Liberal Democrats	James Walsh*	945	65.9	
Liberal Democrats	Daniel Purchese*	833	58.0	
Conservative	David Britton	337	23.5	
Conservative	David Gaskin	336	23.4	New
Labour	Robert Gowland	136	9.5	
Labour	Stephen McConnell	135	9.4	
Majority				
Turnout		1,464	38.0	
Rejected ballots		29		
Registered electors		3,854		
Liberal Democrats hold		Swing		
Liberal Democrats hold		Swing		

=== Bersted ===
Bersted (3 seats)
Party	Candidate	Votes	%	±%
Liberal Democrats	Kenton Batley	760	42.9	
Liberal Democrats	Gillian Yeates	742	41.9	
Liberal Democrats	Martin Lury	704	39.8	
Conservative	Keir Greenway	474	26.8	
UKIP	Ann Rapnik*	433	24.5	
Conservative	Susan Bence*	427	24.1	
Conservative	Graham Levell	375	21.2	New
Labour	Heather Robbins	228	12.9	New
Labour	Jeremy Tomlinson	208	11.8	New
Labour	Michelle White	179	10.1	New
Majority				
Turnout		1,781	25.4	
Rejected ballots		11		
Registered electors		7,019		
Liberal Democrats gain from Conservative		Swing		
Liberal Democrats gain from UKIP		Swing		
Liberal Democrats gain from Conservative		Swing		

=== Brookfield ===
Brookfield (2 seats)
Party	Candidate	Votes	%	±%
Liberal Democrats	William Blanchard-Cooper	736	56.6	
Liberal Democrats	Christopher Blanchard-Cooper	711	54.7	New
Conservative	Alan Gammon*	381	29.3	
Conservative	Michael Warren*	379	29.2	
Labour	Christine Wiltshire	135	10.4	
Labour	Neil Campbell	131	10.1	
Majority				
Turnout		1,337	28.5	
Rejected ballots		37		
Registered electors		4,686		
Liberal Democrats gain from Conservative		Swing		
Liberal Democrats gain from Conservative		Swing		

=== Courtwick with Toddington ===
Courtwick with Toddington (3 seats)
Party	Candidate	Votes	%	±%
Conservative	June Caffyn	645	41.0	
Labour	Michael Northeast*	631	40.1	
Conservative	Victoria Rhodes*	586	37.3	
Conservative	Jill Long	547	34.8	New
Labour	Maralyn May	543	34.5	
Labour	Freddie Tandy	543	34.5	
Liberal Democrats	Kevin Blake	388	24.7	
Majority				
Turnout		1,630	22.2	
Rejected ballots		57		
Registered electors		7,347		
Conservative hold		Swing		
Labour hold		Swing		
Conservative gain from UKIP		Swing		

Victoria Rhodes was elected in 2015 as a UKIP councillor.

=== East Preston ===
East Preston (3 seats)
Party	Candidate	Votes	%	±%
Conservative	Terence Chapman*	1,528	64.7	
Conservative	Richard Bower*	1,524	64.6	
Conservative	Paul Kelly	1,443	61.1	
Liberal Democrats	Malcolm Taylor-Walsh	640	27.1	New
Liberal Democrats	Robert Burn	634	26.9	New
Labour	Anthony Dines	493	20.9	
Majority				
Turnout		2,413	34.7	
Rejected ballots		53		
Registered electors		6,952		
Conservative hold		Swing		
Conservative hold		Swing		
Conservative hold		Swing		

=== Felpham East ===
Felpham East (2 seats)
Party	Candidate	Votes	%	±%
Conservative	Paul English*	725	61.1	
Conservative	David Edwards*	698	58.9	
Liberal Democrats	Wayne Smith	480	40.5	
Majority				
Turnout		1,221	25.9	
Rejected ballots		35		
Registered electors		4,705		
Conservative hold		Swing		
Conservative hold		Swing		

=== Felpham West ===
Felpham West (2 seats)
Party	Candidate	Votes	%	±%
Conservative	Gillian Madeley*	747	57.9	
Conservative	Elaine Stainton*	693	53.7	
Liberal Democrats	Richard Gotheridge	361	28.0	
Liberal Democrats	Robert Waterhouse	343	26.6	
Labour	Jeffrey Daws	151	11.7	New
Labour	Bernard May	142	11.0	New
Majority				
Turnout		1,334	28.4	
Rejected ballots		43		
Registered electors		4,700		
Conservative hold		Swing		
Conservative hold		Swing		

=== Ferring ===
Ferring (2 seats)
Party	Candidate	Votes	%	±%
Conservative	Roger Elkins*	1,070	68.7	
Conservative	Colin Oliver-Redgate*	1,069	68.7	
Labour	Dorothy Macedo	269	17.3	
Labour	Peter Muncey	228	14.6	
Liberal Democrats	Adrian Midgley	215	13.8	New
Majority				
Turnout		1,604	39.0	
Rejected ballots		47		
Registered electors		4,115		
Conservative hold		Swing		
Conservative hold		Swing		

=== Hotham ===
Hotham (2 seats)
Party	Candidate	Votes	%	±%
Independent	Stephen Goodheart	415	38.2	New
Liberal Democrats	Jeanette Chapman	340	31.3	
Liberal Democrats	John Barrett	334	30.8	
Conservative	Joan English	207	19.1	New
Conservative	Stephen Reynolds*	201	18.5	
UKIP	Chloe Newby	193	17.8	New
Labour	David Meagher	154	14.2	
Labour	Roger Nash	137	12.6	
Majority				
Turnout		1,105	26.6	
Rejected ballots		20		
Registered electors		4,147		
Independent gain from Conservative		Swing		
Liberal Democrats hold		Swing		

=== Marine ===
Marine (2 seats)
Party	Candidate	Votes	%	±%
Independent	James Brooks*	684	61.5	
Liberal Democrats	Matthew Stanley*	429	38.6	New
Conservative	Kim-Marie Stone	253	22.8	
Labour	Alison Sharples	212	19.1	
Labour	Nigel Alner*	173	15.6	
Majority				
Turnout		1,130	24.0	
Rejected ballots		18		
Registered electors		4,712		
Independent hold		Swing		
Liberal Democrats gain from Conservative		Swing		

Matthew Stanley was previously elected in a by-election, gaining the Conservative seat.

=== Middleton-on-Sea ===
Middleton-on-Sea (2 seats)
Party	Candidate	Votes	%	±%
Conservative	Jacqueline Pendleton	643	43.4	
Independent	Shirley Haywood	637	43.0	New
Conservative	Paul Wotherspoon*	582	39.3	
Independent	Graham Jones	522	35.2	New
Liberal Democrats	David Box	129	8.7	
Liberal Democrats	Lawrence Walder	112	7.6	
Labour	Richard Missenden	80	5.4	New
Labour	Sam Walker	80	5.4	New
Majority				
Turnout		1,497	35.8	
Rejected ballots		15		
Registered electors		4,177		
Conservative hold		Swing		
Independent gain from Conservative		Swing		

=== Orchard ===
Orchard (2 seats)
Party	Candidate	Votes	%	±%
Liberal Democrats	Francis Oppler*	501	44.7	
Liberal Democrats	Samantha Staniforth	381	34.0	
Independent	Philip Woodall	306	27.3	New
Conservative	David Darling	238	21.2	
Labour	Jan Cosgrove	231	20.6	
Green	Susan Livett	169	15.1	New
Labour	Alan Foster	139	12.4	
Majority				
Turnout		1,137	24.1	
Rejected ballots		15		
Registered electors		4,726		
Liberal Democrats hold		Swing		
Liberal Democrats gain from Conservative		Swing		

=== Pagham ===
Pagham (2 seats)
Party	Candidate	Votes	%	±%
Independent	David Huntley	1,438	62.6	New
Independent	June Hamilton	1,257	54.7	New
Conservative	Anita Hall*	475	20.7	
Conservative	Ashvinkumar Patel*	378	16.5	
UKIP	Paul Davis	283	12.3	
Green	Paul Wyatt	156	6.8	New
Labour	Alistair Black	147	6.4	New
Labour	Helen Scutt	103	4.5	New
Majority				
Turnout		2,304	45.3	
Rejected ballots		7		
Registered electors		5,090		
Independent gain from Conservative		Swing		
Independent gain from Conservative		Swing		

=== Pevensey ===
Pevensey (2 seats)
Party	Candidate	Votes	%	±%
Independent	Sandra Daniells*	403	39.5	
Liberal Democrats	Inna Erskine	396	38.8	New
Liberal Democrats	John Erskine	319	31.2	New
Conservative	Patrick Dillon*	266	26.1	
Labour	Simon McDougall	197	19.3	
Labour	Linda Shepperd	182	17.8	
Majority				
Turnout		1,044	25.1	
Rejected ballots		23		
Registered electors		4,165		
Independent hold		Swing		
Liberal Democrats gain from Conservative		Swing		

=== River ===
River (3 seats)
Party	Candidate	Votes	%	±%
Liberal Democrats	Ian Buckland*	962	43.6	
Liberal Democrats	Tracey Baker	912	41.3	
Liberal Democrats	Emily Seex	821	37.2	
Labour	George O'Neill	514	23.3	
Conservative	Philip Booker	494	22.4	New
Labour	Alan Butcher	488	22.1	
Labour	Bernadette Millam	441	20.0	
Conservative	George Blampied*	414	18.8	
Conservative	David Paige	365	16.5	New
UKIP	Steven Trigg	362	16.4	
Majority				
Turnout		2,232	31.9	
Rejected ballots		25		
Registered electors		6,988		
Liberal Democrats hold		Swing		
Liberal Democrats gain from Conservative		Swing		
Liberal Democrats gain from UKIP		Swing		

=== Rustington East ===
Rustington East (2 seats)
Party	Candidate	Votes	%	±%
Conservative	Alison Cooper	975	61.2	
Conservative	Shaun Gunner	861	54.0	
Liberal Democrats	Jessica Halligan	497	31.2	
Liberal Democrats	David Chase	466	29.2	
Labour	Christopher Walsh	177	11.1	
Majority				
Turnout		1,628	35.9	
Rejected ballots		34		
Registered electors		4,541		
Conservative hold		Swing		
Conservative hold		Swing		

=== Rustington West ===
Rustington West (3 seats)
Party	Candidate	Votes	%	±%
Liberal Democrats	Pauline Gregory	1,281	51.9	
Liberal Democrats	Jamies Bennett	1,226	49.7	
Liberal Democrats	William Tilbrook	1,128	45.7	New
Conservative	Philippa Bower*	942	38.2	
Conservative	Stephen Horne	885	35.9	
Conservative	Mark Turner	876	35.5	
Labour	Lucy Toynbee	269	10.9	
Labour	Nigel Stapley	258	10.5	
Majority				
Turnout		2,524	37.1	
Rejected ballots		58		
Registered electors		6,796		
Liberal Democrats gain from Conservative		Swing		
Liberal Democrats gain from Conservative		Swing		
Liberal Democrats gain from Conservative		Swing		

=== Yapton ===
Yapton (2 seats)
Party	Candidate	Votes	%	±%
Liberal Democrats	Amanda Worne	800	54.2	New
Liberal Democrats	Joshua Jones	550	37.3	New
Conservative	Stephen Haymes*	382	25.9	
Conservative	Derek Ambler*	371	25.1	
UKIP	Patricia Wales	277	18.8	
Green	Douglas Maw	254	17.2	New
Majority				
Turnout		1,482	31.0	
Rejected ballots		6		
Registered electors		4,784		
Liberal Democrats gain from Conservative		Swing		
Liberal Democrats gain from UKIP		Swing		

Derek Ambler was elected in 2015 as a UKIP councillor.

== Changes between 2019 and 2023 ==
- By July 2019, Tracey Baker, who had been elected as a Liberal Democrat councillor for River ward, was sitting as an independent; she later joined the Arun Independent Group by April 2021.
- By May 2021, Emily Seex, who had been elected as a Liberal Democrat councillor for River ward, was the leader of the Arun Independent Group.
- By July 2021, Samantha-Jayne Staniforth, who had been elected as a Liberal Democrat councillor for Orchard ward, had joined the Conservatives.
- In January 2023, Ian Buckland, who had been elected as a Liberal Democrat councillor for River ward but had been sitting as an independent since shortly after the election, rejoined the Liberal Democrat group.

=== By-elections ===
==== Brookfield ====
The Brookfield by-election was triggered by the death of Liberal Democrat councillor Chris Blanchard-Cooper.

Brookfield by-election, 6 May 2021
Party	Candidate	Votes	%	±%
Conservative	David Chace	680	48.5	+18.1
Liberal Democrats	Bob Woodman	526	37.5	−21.3
Labour	Freddie Tandy	152	10.8	±0.0
Workers Party	Jonathan Maxted	45	3.2	New
Majority		154	11.0	N/A
Turnout		1,411	29.7	
Conservative gain from Liberal Democrats		Swing	▲19.7	

==== Pevensey ====
The Pevensey by-election was triggered by the resignation of councillor Inna Erskine.

Pevensey by-election, 6 May 2021
Party	Candidate	Votes	%	±%
Conservative	Joan English	357	38.3	+17.2
Liberal Democrats	John Barrett	210	22.5	−8.9
Labour	Simon McDougall	140	15.0	−0.6
Independent	Jan Cosgrove	132	14.2	N/A
Green	Carol Birch	93	10.0	New
Majority		147	15.8	N/A
Turnout		947	22.4	
Conservative gain from Liberal Democrats		Swing	▲13.1	

==== Barnham ====
The Barnham by-election was triggered by the death of councillor John Charles.

Barnham by-election, 8 September 2022
Party	Candidate	Votes	%	±%
Green	Sue Wallsgrove	786	50.9	
Conservative	Graham Jones	641	41.5	
Labour	Alan Butcher	116	7.5	
Majority		145	9.4	N/A
Turnout		1547	21.3	
Green gain from Conservative		Swing		

==== Arundel & Walberton ====
The Arundel & Walberton by-election followed the disqualification of Green councillor Faye Catterson for non-attendance.

Arundel & Walberton by-election, 1 December 2022
Party	Candidate	Votes	%	±%
Green	Stephen McAuliffe	873	47.7	+8.8
Conservative	Mario Trabucco	549	30.0	−17.9
Labour	Michael Ward	407	22.3	+3.7
Majority		324	17.7	N/A
Turnout		1,839	27.1	
Green hold		Swing	N/A	
