= Greatham Church =

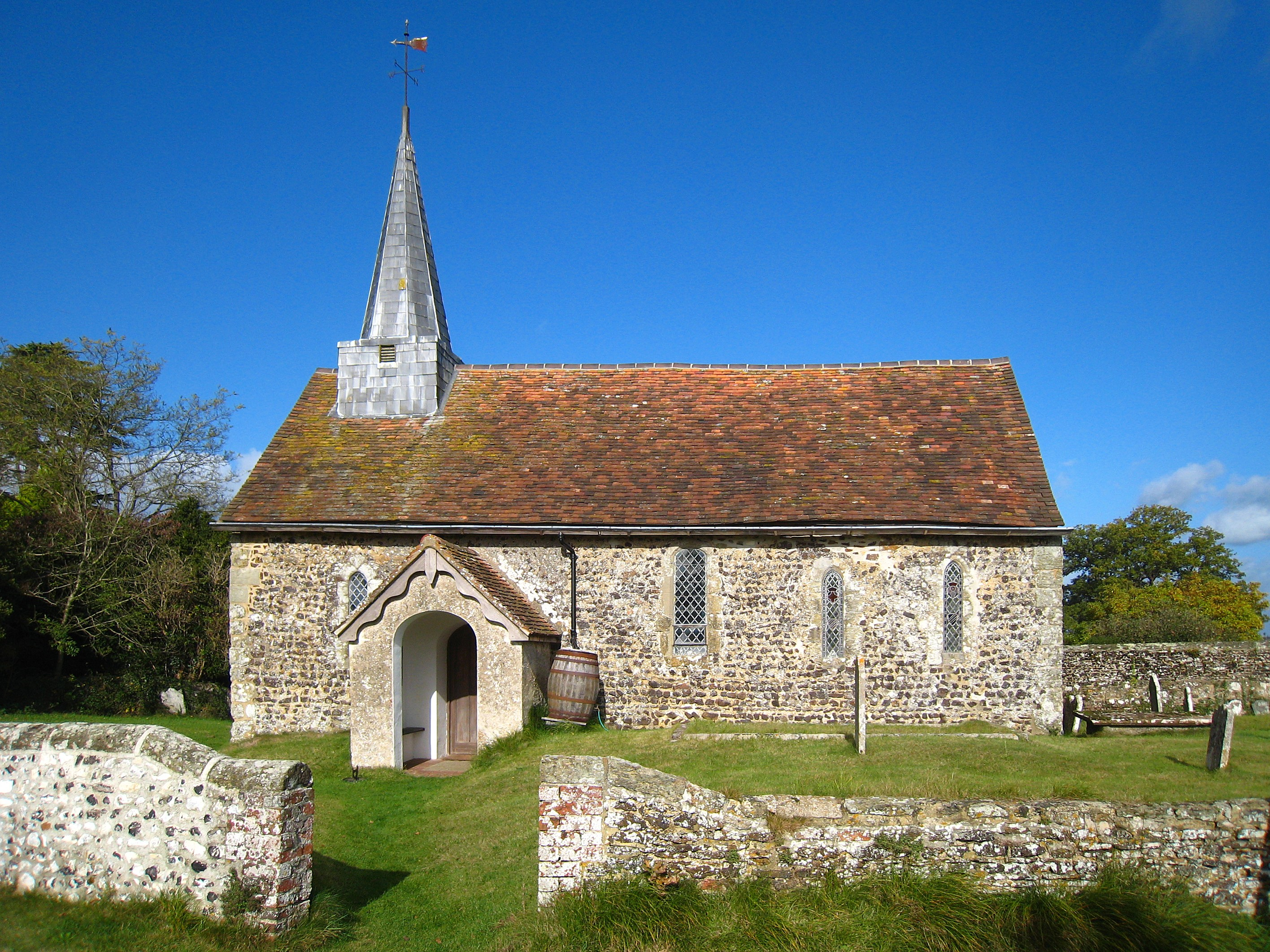
- The church from the south
- Greatham Church
- 50.9340°N 0.5158°W
- Location: Off Brook Lane, Greatham, West Sussex RH20 2ES
- Country: England
- Denomination: Church of England

History
- Status: Parish church
- Founded: 12th century
- Dedication: Unknown

Architecture
- Functional status: Active
- Heritage designation: Grade I
- Designated: 15 March 1955
- Style: Norman
- Groundbreaking: 12th century

Administration
- Province: Canterbury
- Diocese: Chichester
- Archdeaconry: Horsham
- Deanery: Rural Deanery of Storrington
- Parish: Greatham

Greatham Church (the dedication is unrecorded) is the Anglican parish church of the hamlet of Greatham in the district of Horsham, one of seven local government districts in the English county of West Sussex. The tiny single-room building has been described variously as "delightful" and "one of the most appealing churches in Sussex". The unrestored 12th-century stone church serves a rural area near the River Arun and sits apart from the hamlet next to the ancient manor house. The church is a Grade I Listed building.

== History ==
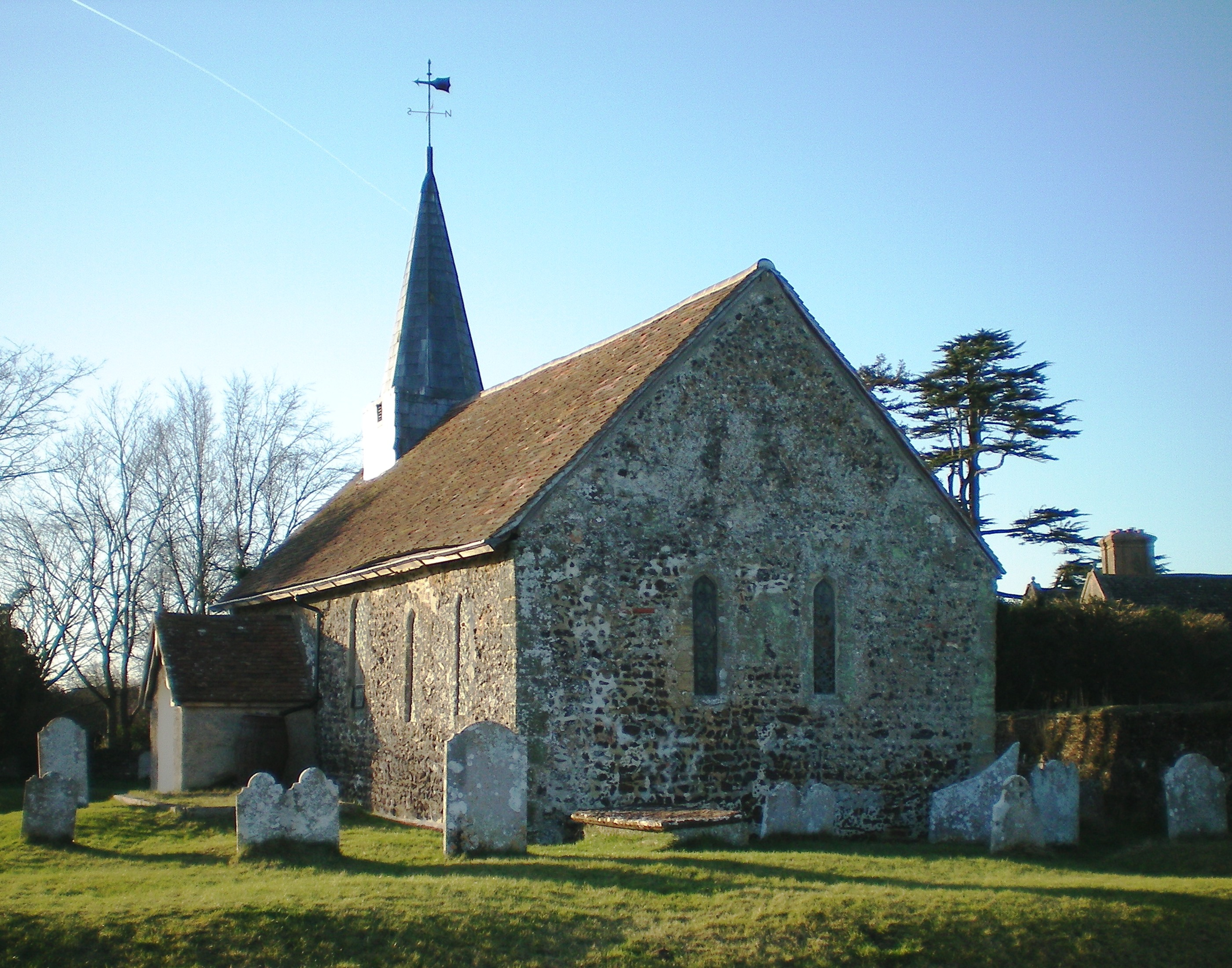
The church from the south east

Like nearby Wiggonholt Church, which it resembles, Greatham Church was erected in about 1100 to serve the sparsely populated marshlands next to the River Arun between Pulborough and Amberley. The hamlet was an agricultural community from the Saxon era, and shepherds would have formed the bulk of the early congregation. The Amberley Wild Brooks Site of Special Scientific Interest is nearby. Rubble and brickwork from nearby Roman sites was incorporated in the walls, which are aligned at odd angles and do not match in length or thickness.

The original east window was blocked later, and two lancet windows were inserted in its place in the 13th century. Similar windows were added to the north and south walls at the same time. The 12th-century entrance in the north wall was also bricked up, but its stone jambs are still visible.

Minimal restoration was performed in the 19th century, in contrast to many other Sussex churches, although the original bell-turret was replaced by one topped with a spire. A new entrance, set in a porch, was added on the south side, and a vestry was built onto the north wall—although this was removed in the mid-20th century. Most of the internal fittings are early 19th-century. When the vestry was being built, five soldiers were found buried next to the church wall: they had been killed at the Battle of Greatham Bridge during the English Civil War.

== Architecture ==
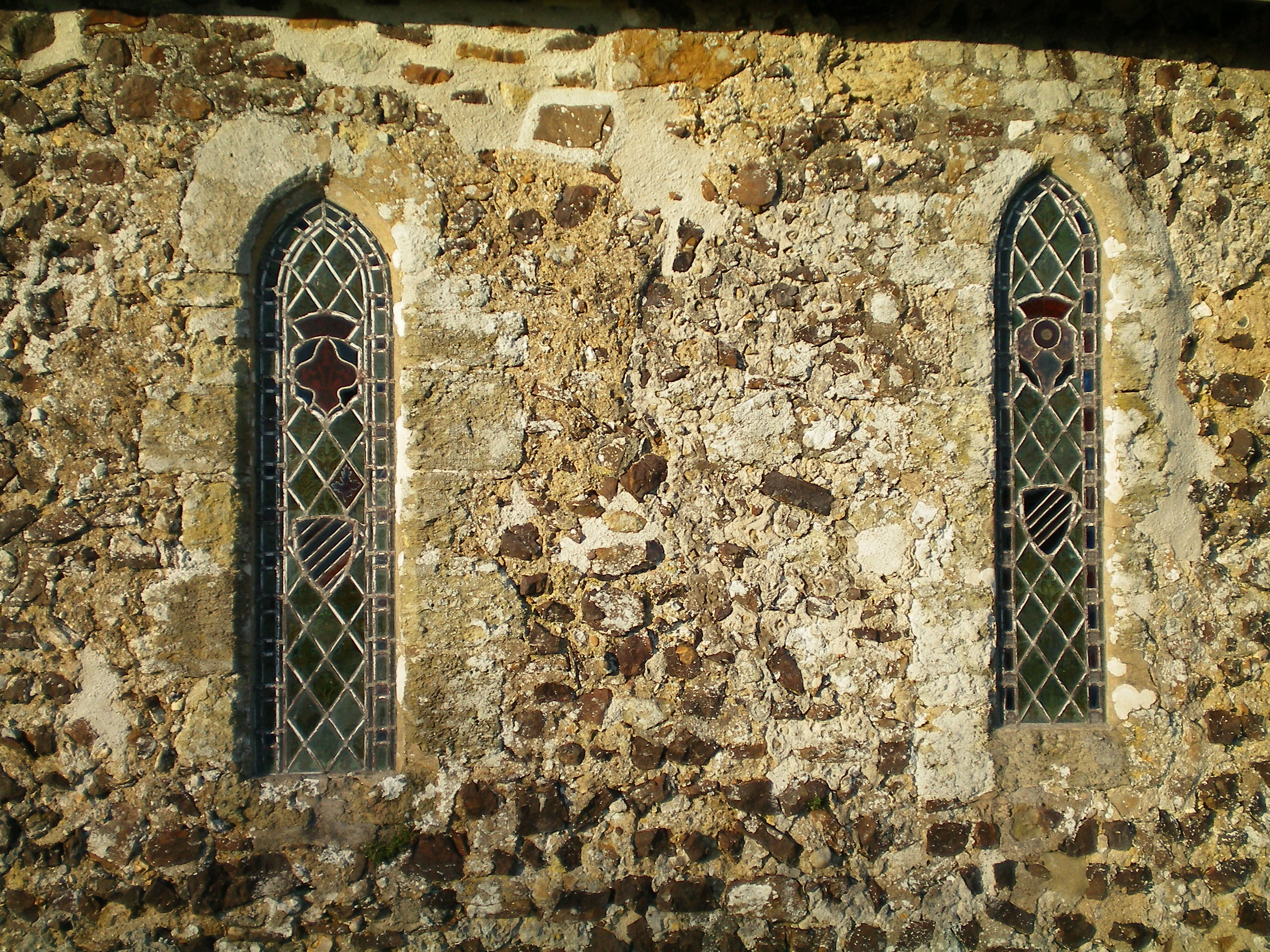
Lancet windows were built into the walls in the 13th century.

Greatham Church is a tiny, primitive, unrestored building dating from the "Saxo-Norman overlap" period when Anglo-Saxon architecture was giving way to the Norman style. The writer Arthur Mee was once told not to mistake the church for a haystack: set in the middle of fields and on its own apart from the manor house, it has an extremely basic and modest feel—amplified by its lack of electricity and piped water. The walls, of unequal length and thickness, are principally of ironstone with some chalk, flint, Roman-era masonry and rubble, local (Pulborough) sandstone and Horsham Stone. Ian Nairn described them as having "a wonderful texture". At one corner, the Pulborough sandstone quoins have a set of roughly carved crosses. These are believed to be consecration crosses, which were blessed when the church was completed and consecrated. The building has a single room with no division between the nave and chancel. There is also a slate-hung bell-turret with a small spire. The windows, inserted in the 13th century, are Early English-style lancets. The roof is an old, but not original, king post structure.

Interior fittings include a "rustic" altar rail with a crenellated upper surface, dating from the 17th century. A good example of a Gothic Revival-style two-decker pulpit, in dark wood and built in the early 19th century (possibly around 1820), also survives, as do box pews of the same era. The porch houses a slab of local marble which may have formed part of the original altar. The walls are whitewashed.

== The church today ==
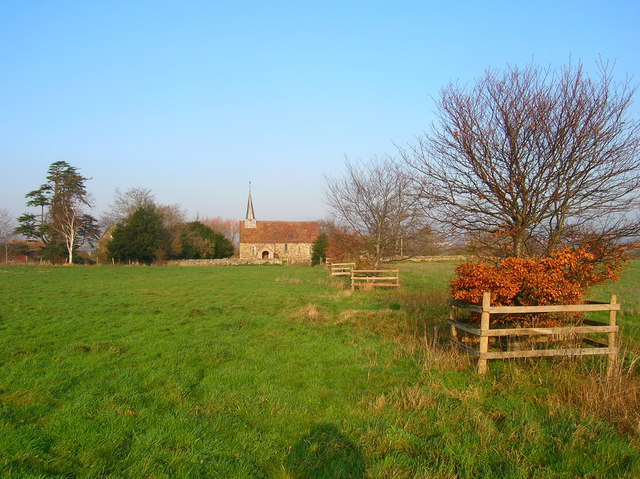
The church is in an isolated rural setting.

The church was designated a Grade I Listed building on 15 March 1955.

Priests serving two or more churches is a common practice in modern times, but in the Middle Ages it was very unusual; nevertheless Greatham and Wiggonholt were united in this way from 1443. The church now has its own parish again: it covers the hamlet of Greatham and its rural surroundings as far as the railway line between Pulborough and Amberley. It is part of a larger benefice which includes the churches at Amberley, Parham and Wiggonholt and the former St Mary the Virgin's Church (now redundant) at North Stoke.

== See also ==
- List of places of worship in Horsham (district)
