= St Mary Magdalene's Church, Tortington =

St Mary Magdalene's Church
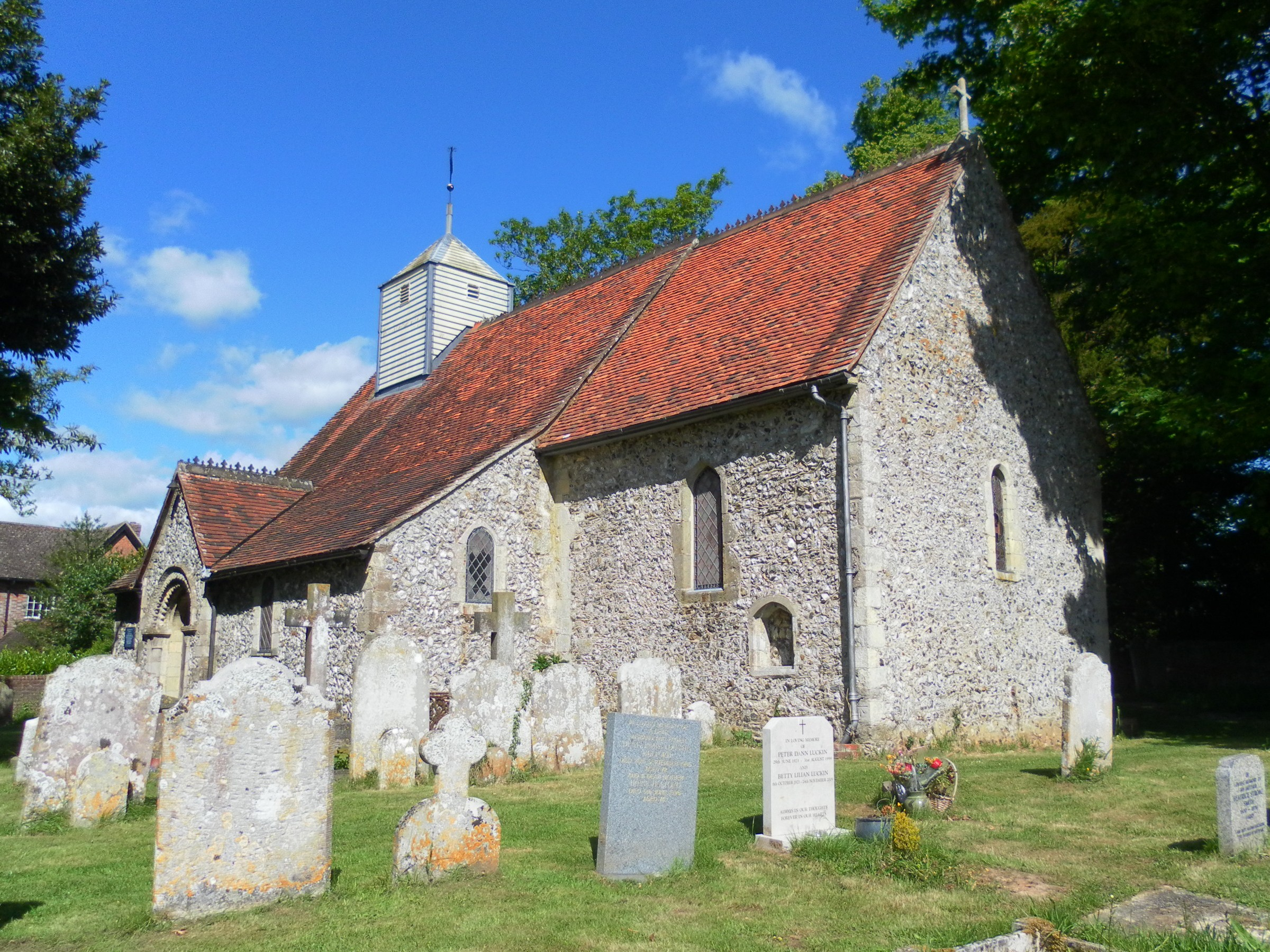
- The church from the southeast
- St Mary Magdalene's Church
- 50.8357°N 0.5769°W
- Location: Off Ford Road, Tortington, Arundel, West Sussex BN18 0BG
- Country: England
- Denomination: Church of England

History
- Status: Parish church
- Founded: 12th century
- Dedication: Mary Magdalene
- Events: 1978: declared redundant

Architecture
- Functional status: Redundant
- Heritage designation: Grade II
- Designated: 5 June 1958
- Style: Norman
- Groundbreaking: 12th century

Administration
- Province: Canterbury
- Diocese: Chichester
- Archdeaconry: Chichester
- Deanery: Rural Deanery of Arundel and Bognor
- Parish: Arundel with Tortington

St Mary Magdalene's Church is the former Anglican parish church of the hamlet of Tortington in the district of Arun, one of seven local government districts in the English county of West Sussex. Founded in the 12th century to serve a priory and villagers in the riverside location, it has experienced little change despite a 19th-century restoration. Its ancient chancel arch and doorway have remarkable carvings with "grotesque, boggle-eyed monsters", rare beakhead figures and chevron ornamentation. Standing in a picturesque setting behind a farm, the flint and Caen stone building was used for worship until 1978, when it was declared redundant. It is now cared for by the Churches Conservation Trust, and English Heritage has listed it at Grade II for its architectural and historical importance. The church is dedicated to Jesus's companion Mary Magdalene.

== History ==
Tortington is an ancient manor and parish next to the River Arun in West Sussex. The ecclesiastical parish was originally shaped like an inverted triangle, but many boundary changes took place over the centuries. As well as the manor – mentioned in the Domesday Book of 1086 – there was a medieval Augustinian monastery, Tortington Priory. An agricultural hamlet had developed by the 12th century, and its layout and function have changed little since then.

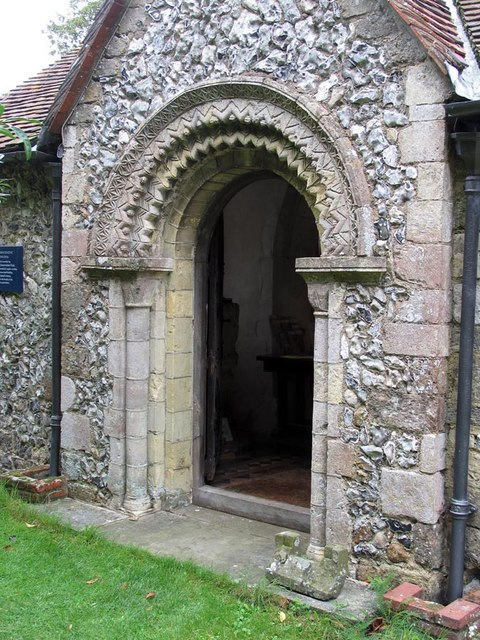
The church retains a 12th-century doorway with carvings "like something out of a medieval fantasy".

A church was first mentioned in the mid-12th century, when there was a rectory. It was built primarily to serve the priory. The doorway and "delightful" chancel arch survive from that era (both have been dated to c. 1140), and the layout and fabric of the church are still largely 12th-century despite subsequent restoration. An aisle with two bays was added to the south side of the nave in the 13th century, and the doorway was moved to accommodate it. The aisle was later destroyed (during or before the 18th century), and its arcade was blocked. Another 13th-century change was the addition of lancet windows in the north and south walls of the chancel.

The church was quick to install seating for parishioners as this gradually became standard in the 15th and 16th centuries (until then, churches had none). Some of these early seats survive, in the form of plain, straight-headed wooden benches. Features described in the medieval period but now lost include a Lady chapel – a recess on the outside of the chancel wall may be a remnant of this – a leaded steeple and a porch, of which there are fragmentary remains. A white bell-turret, similar to that at St Andrew's Church at nearby Ford, replaced the steeple. Constructed of timber and added in the 18th century, it was apparently painted white to help with navigation along the adjacent River Arun. Also in the 18th century, the chancel arch and chancel roof were remodelled (the nave had already acquired a timber king post roof in the medieval era)

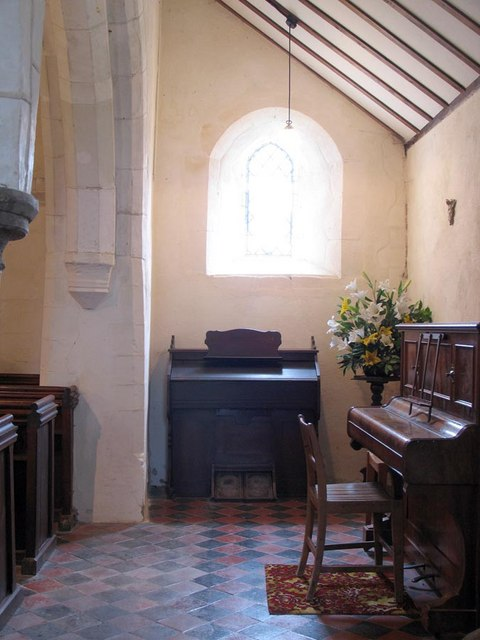
The south aisle, added in 1867, replaced a 13th-century aisle which had been destroyed many years before.

Many Sussex churches were restored during the Victorian era, sometimes drastically; St Mary Magdalene's Church was reordered in 1867, but the changes were modest. A new south aisle was built to replace the destroyed 13th-century aisle, and the arcade separating it from the nave was unblocked. The doorway was moved to its original position as a result. A vestry was built on the north side in 1892, and Philip Mainwaring Johnston undertook further work in 1904.

The area remained sparsely populated in the 20th century, and congregations declined. The Diocese of Chichester declared St Mary Magdalene's Church redundant on 1 August 1978. It was placed into the care of the Redundant Churches Fund (now the Churches Conservation Trust) on 21 April 1980, and is now one of five former churches in West Sussex administered by the charity; the others are at Chichester, Church Norton, North Stoke and Warminghurst.

St Mary Magdalene's Church was listed at Grade II by English Heritage on 5 June 1958. Such buildings are defined as being "nationally important and of special interest". As of February 2001, it was one of 913 Grade II listed buildings, and 960 listed buildings of all grades, in the district of Arun.

=== Parochial history ===
The parish boundaries and advowson of St Mary Magdalene's Church have a complicated history. For most of its existence, it was a parish church with its own vicar, although the incumbents did not always live in the parish (they generally lived in nearby Arundel from the early 19th century onwards). The church at Binsted was within the parish in the 16th century. In 1897, the parish ceased to be independent: it became part of a joint benefice with Arundel. A third church, at South Stoke, was added to this arrangement in 1929; the parishes were never merged though. Tortington's identity survives as of 2026 in the legal name of the parish of St Nicholas's Church, Arundel: Arundel with Tortington. Its benefice is still called Arundel with Tortington and South Stoke.

The advowson (the right to appoint clergy) was first mentioned in 1214, when it was held by William d'Aubigny, 3rd Earl of Arundel. It passed to Tortington Priory by 1380 and stayed with that institution until the Dissolution of the Monasteries in the mid-16th century, when it passed to the Lord of the manor at Tortington Manor. This continued throughout the 16th and 17th centuries, although the Earl of Arundel apparently held the right again in 1579 and The Crown made three appointments in the 17th century. Various other noblemen held the advowson in the 18th and 19th centuries until it passed to the Bishop of Chichester in 1897.

== Architecture ==
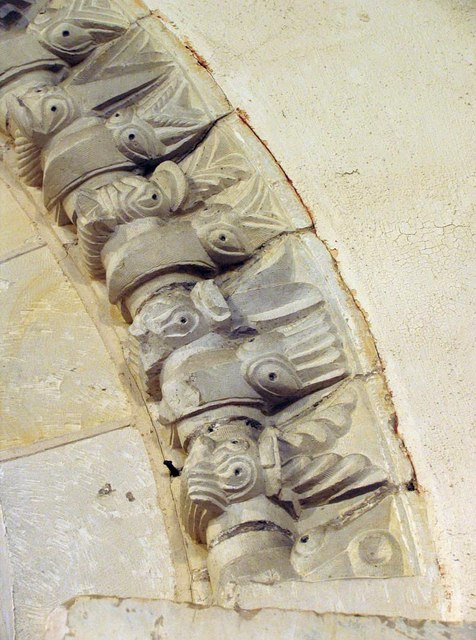
"Grotesque monsters" glare down at the congregation from around the chancel arch

St Mary Magdalene's Church has a nave, a narrower chancel, a vestry on the north side accessed from the nave, a south aisle with an arcade, a timber bell-turret and a roof of clay tiles which slopes steeply as a catslide over the aisle. Flint and stone rubble are the main building materials; there are quoins of Caen stone. Remains of the original south porch can still be seen.

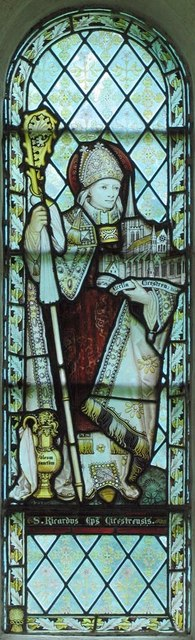
Charles Eamer Kempe's stained glass window of St Richard of Chichester is considered one of his best works.

The most distinctive features of the church are its two surviving Norman-era structures: the south doorway and the chancel arch. These are densely and richly carved with a wide range of decorations, including bizarre monsters and unusual beakhead-shaped designs. The latter are rare in Sussex – only St Mary's Church at Broadwater and St Mary de Haura Church at Shoreham-by-Sea have similar designs. The doorway, whose door has decorative strap hinges, has three layers of carvings in its semicircular arch; they are in the form of chevrons, stars and grapes. The chevrons form a zigzag pattern and reach the jambs and capitals; the outside face has the grape-like motifs in the angles where these meet, and the labels (horizontal elements) have the repeating star pattern. Nikolaus Pevsner describes the carvings as "keeping inside the established pattern" of such work, and not displaying the "extraordinary ... [simultaneously] mannered and extrovert" details of the carved doorway at St Mary's Church at nearby Climping.

Inside, the carvings around the chancel arch – dating from about 1140, like the doorway – consist of "an amazing congregation of grotesque monsters", "boggle-eyed ... with beaks, tongues and squid-like tentacles, that frown and glare at visitors below". The roll mouldings of the arch are held in the beaks of these "fearsome", "wide-eyed horrors". Such "beakhead" decoration is a little-understood feature of Late Norman architecture: in churches, it may have been used to capture the congregation's interest or to inspire fear and awe. The moulding has two orders (recessed jambs which together form a chamfered opening): in contrast to the lavishly decorated outer order, the inner order is plain.

Some Norman windows survive: these are large, round-arched and chamfered with deep splays. The chancel has 13th-century lancets, some of which have stained glass by Charles Eamer Kempe (one, of St Richard of Chichester, has been described as "of exceptional quality compared with most windows of this period [late 19th century] in Sussex"). The east window of the chancel has stained glass attributed to Thomas Willement. The south aisle, added in the 13th century and unblocked in 1867 during the restoration of that year, has chamfered arches supported on round abaci and octagonal responds.

The oldest internal fitting is a 12th-century font of Caen stone, with a round bowl, foliage decoration in the form of honeysuckles, decorative mouldings and an arcade-style motif with scallop-shaped capitals. An "interesting" plain Jacobean pulpit of the early 17th century, with legs rather than the usual single stem, may have been made by a local craftsman. There are 15th-century panelled pews in the south aisle. Above the chancel arch there are two 18th-century funerary hatchments.

== See also ==
- List of churches preserved by the Churches Conservation Trust in Southeast England
- List of places of worship in Arun
