= St Mary the Virgin's Church, North Stoke =

St Mary the Virgin
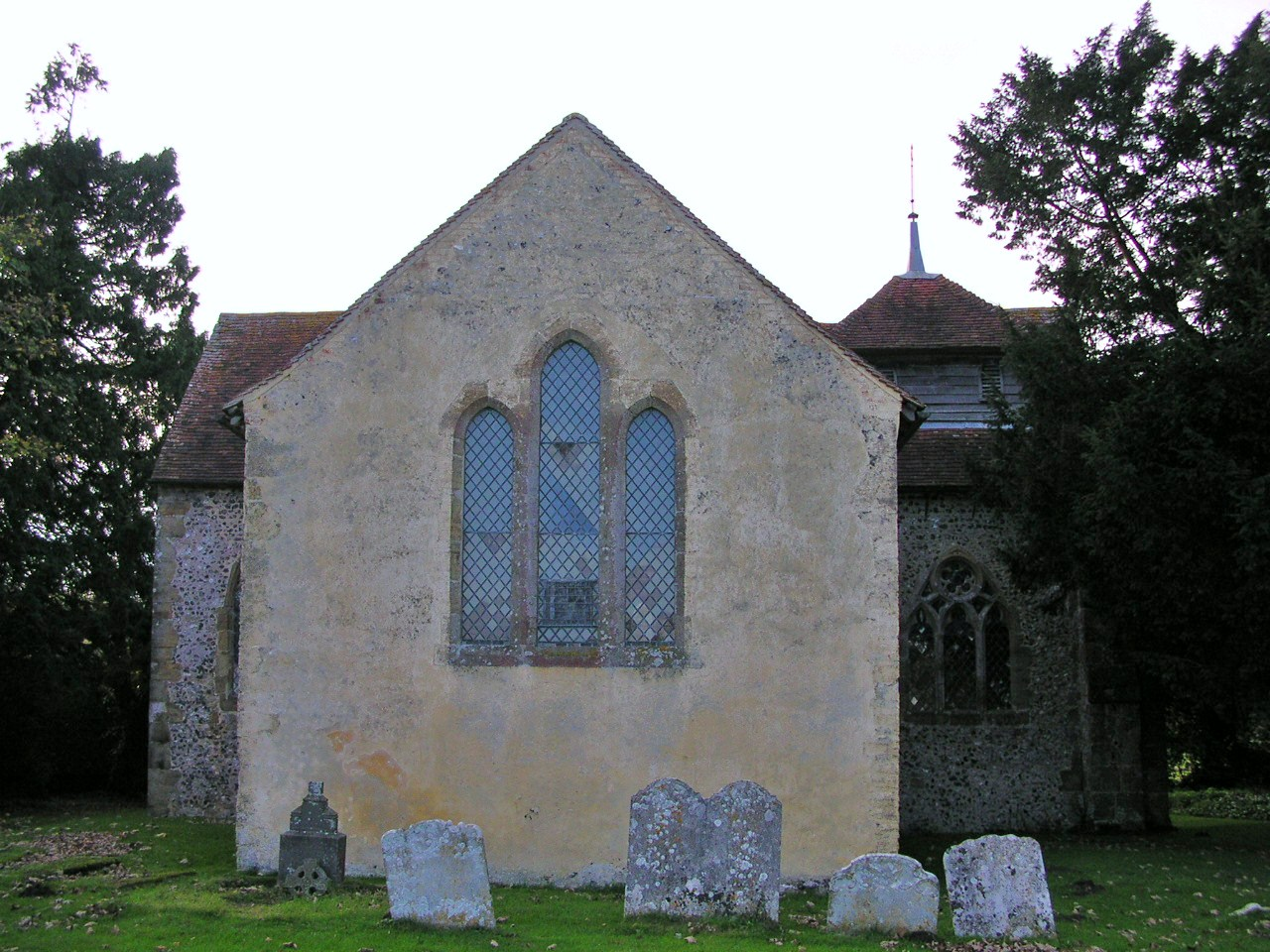
- St Mary the Virgin church from the east

- Location of the church in West Sussex
- 50.8874°N 0.5514°W
- Location: North Stoke Church, North Stoke, Amberley, West Sussex BN18 9LS
- Country: England
- Denomination: Church of England

History
- Former name: North Stoke Church (no dedication)
- Founded: 11th century
- Dedication: Mary the Virgin
- Dedicated: 8 December 2007 (rededication)

Architecture
- Functional status: Redundant
- Heritage designation: Grade I
- Designated: 15 March 1955
- Style: Norman; Early English Gothic
- Closed: 1 March 1992

Administration
- Diocese: Chichester
- Archdeaconry: Horsham
- Deanery: Storrington
- Parish: Amberley with North Stoke

North Stoke Church, rededicated in 2007 to St Mary the Virgin after its medieval dedication was unexpectedly rediscovered, is a former Church of England parish church in the riverside hamlet of North Stoke in the Horsham District of West Sussex. The partly 11th-century cruciform building, set in an almost deserted village in a loop of the River Arun, is mostly unrestored and stands on an ancient earthwork which has pre-Christian origins. The building has architectural features and internal fittings spanning hundreds of years, including some very old stained glass and wall paintings, although there are few memorials compared with other Sussex churches of a similar age. The church, "movingly eloquent of centuries of remote Sussex agricultural life", is no longer used for worship: it was declared redundant in 1992, after which it was entrusted to the Churches Conservation Trust. English Heritage lists the church at Grade I for its architectural and historical importance.

== History ==
The village of North Stoke, now much smaller than in previous centuries, sits opposite South Stoke — with which it is linked by a 1/2-mile (800 m) path across the River Arun. Road access between the two places requires an 8-mile (13 km) drive around Arundel Park and down a long dead-end track from Houghton. Access is also possible along a downland path from nearby Burpham.

A church here was mentioned at the time of the Domesday Book of 1086. It is likely to have been a Saxon wooden church. Later in the 11th century the present nave may have been built over its foundations. The tall, wide structure has a single window on each side (north and south), and lacks side aisles. The next addition was a mid 13th-century Early English Gothic chancel; its north and south lancet windows give an indication of how church windows had developed since Norman times. In about 1290 the building was made cruciform by the addition of north and south transepts. That on the north side was built so it could bear a tower, but this addition was never made. Instead a belfry was added, "astonishingly situated astride the ridge" of its roof according to Nikolaus Pevsner. The transept wings have windows with Decorated Gothic tracery, showing a further evolution in window design. Also in about 1290 the church was given some small stained glass windows depicting the Coronation of the Virgin. This represents a very early example by Sussex standards, dating from a period when stained glasswork was moving from the grisaille style and the basic Tree of Jesse towards Biblical figures.

The nave and chancel were structurally divided in the early 14th century by a horseshoe-shaped chancel arch built of clunch and covered with elaborate decorative mouldings. The remains of a contemporary wall painting are visible above it, and on each side there is a recess—the left-hand one of which has a carving of a human hand on its corbel. The wall paintings, depicting flowers and foliage, are said to have inspired the 16th-century local artist Lambert Barnard in his designs for the vaults at nearby Boxgrove Priory and Chichester Cathedral.

Unlike many churches in Sussex, North Stoke Church was not restored during the 19th century, although Philip Mainwaring Johnston undertook some work in 1910 and the east window in the chancel is a modern replacement. In particular, the simple timber roof design has lasted for more than 700 years without the need for alteration. The timberwork is clearly visible in the nave and south transept in particular.

On 1 March 1992 the Diocese of Chichester declared the church redundant. From the same date, under the provisions of section 50 of the Pastoral Measure 1983, it was placed into the care of the Redundant Churches Fund (now the Churches Conservation Trust). The Trust administers five former churches in West Sussex; the others are at Chichester, Church Norton, Tortington and Warminghurst. The church is open for visitors every day.

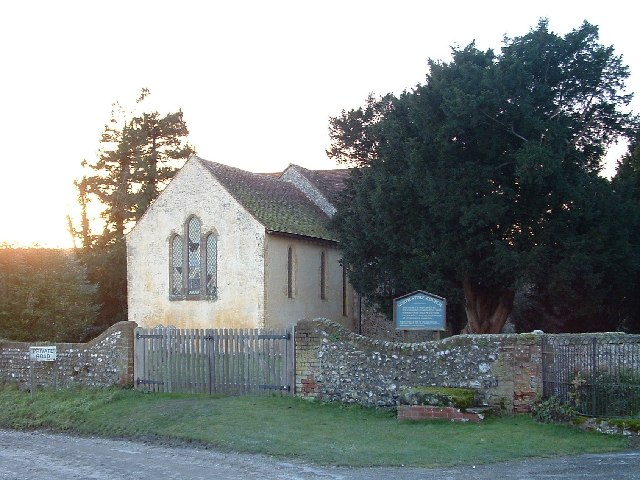
The chancel sits behind a gate giving access to the churchyard.

Under its former name of North Stoke Church, the building was listed at Grade I by English Heritage on 15 March 1955. Such buildings are defined as being of "exceptional interest" and greater than national importance. As of February 2001, it was one of 38 Grade I listed buildings, and 1,726 listed buildings of all grades, in the district of Horsham.

In late 2007 two amateur archaeologists on an ecclesiastical archaeology course at the University of Sussex unexpectedly found an ancient document giving the dedication of the church, which had been unknown since the English Reformation or before. Tony and Lesley Voice were examining documents at The National Archives in Kew, London, when they found a piece of vellum stuck to the back of one. It was a letter written by the Bishop of Chichester Stephen Bersted to King Edward I in 1275, indicating that the church was dedicated to Mary the Virgin. Accordingly, a rededication ceremony was held at the now redundant church on 8 December 2007, at which it was officially renamed from North Stoke Church to St Mary the Virgin Church. Other discoveries made at the same time included the involvement of William FitzAlan, 16th Earl of Arundel in the medieval life of the church.

The parish of St. Mary the Virgin has been combined with that of St Michael and All Angels, Amberley. This parish now has the legal name Amberley with North Stoke. This is part of a benefice that also includes the churches of Greatham, Parham and Wiggonholt.

== Architecture and fittings ==
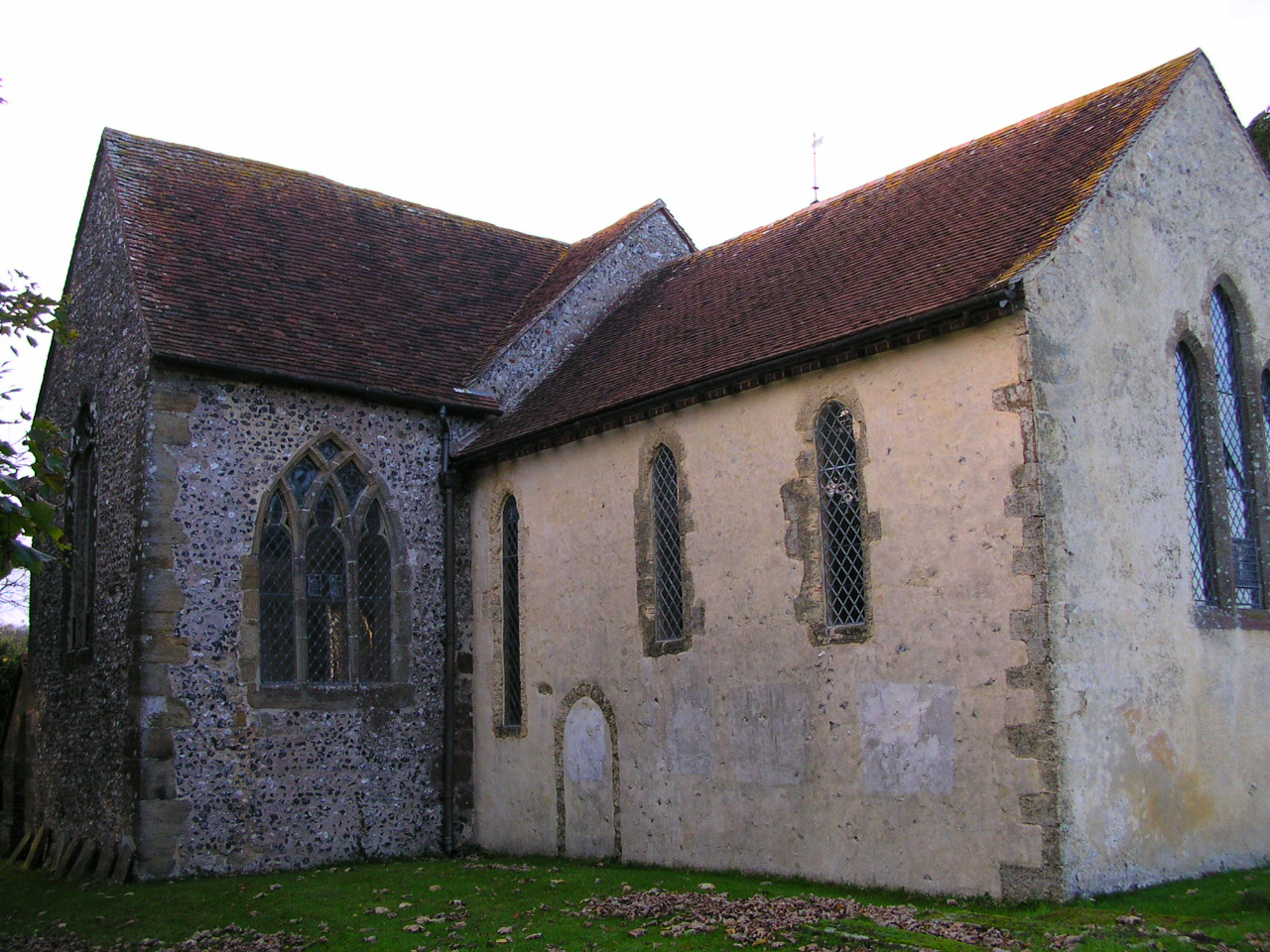
Flint and stone are the main building materials.

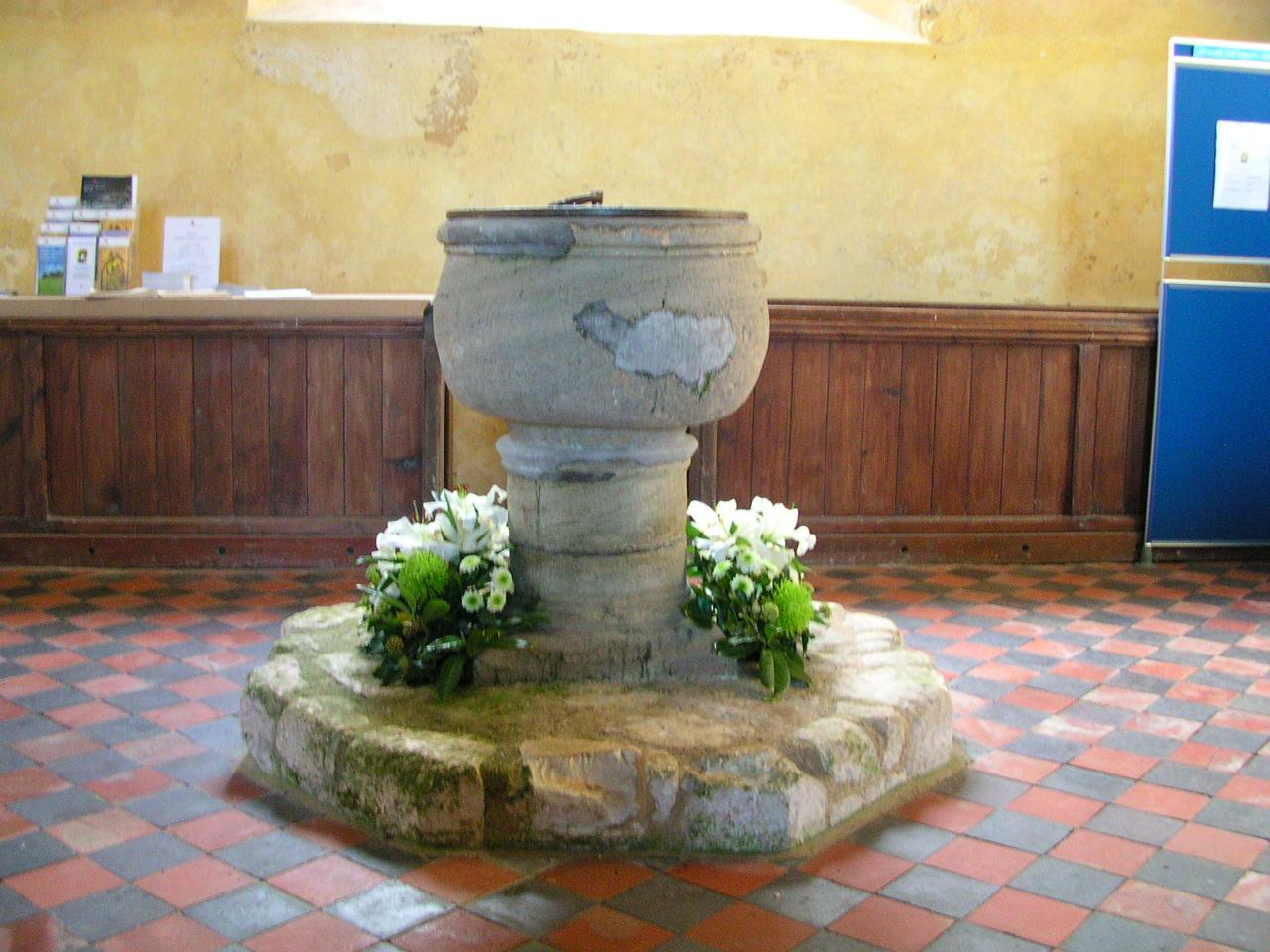
The church has a bulbous stone font from about 1200, carved from local stone.

St Mary the Virgin Church is a simple two-cell structure built during three periods. Its nave is 11th-century; a chancel was added early in the 13th century; and transepts were built on the north and south sides later in that century. The north transept was buttressed and built with a more square shape in anticipation of a tower being built on top, but this did not happen and a small belfry surmounts it instead. The church is built of locally quarried flint and stone.

The interior is plainly decorated and light, with mostly plain glass and whitewashed walls. Its "delightfully unrestored" appearance gives it a "timeless atmosphere". The main structural features are a simple timber roof with exposed beams and a more intricately decorated chancel arch of the early 14th century, built of clunch. A notable architectural feature of the church is the wide variety of window designs that have survived ("a history in miniature of window architecture"): Norman slits with crude lancet heads give way to taller lancets with Early English Gothic and Decorated Gothic tracery, and later wide lancets. Six styles of window have been identified overall. The three-light east window, the only modern replacement, was put in after its predecessor's tracery gradually disappeared over the centuries. Although most of the glass is clear, the stained glass that does survive is very old and in good condition—although some has been reset and is no longer in its original position.

Internal fittings include a mid 13th-century piscina which is joined to three sedilia by continuous moulded scrollwork. Above this, two blocked archways rise and meet at a corbel carved with a sheep's head. This may be Norman and could have come from elsewhere in the church. There are also carvings representing monks' heads supporting statues. Apart from the main piscina, two others survive elsewhere in the church, suggesting that there may have been two subsidiary altars at one point.

The principal monuments in the church are six stone slabs set into the chancel floor and dating from the late 17th and early 18th centuries, and a two-colour marble tablet on the chancel wall in memory of three members of the Sayres family who died between 1809 and 1820. The latter is reminiscent of the Regency style. The churchyard has very few stones or markers, although three with carved crosses have been identified as late 13th-century.

The oldest fixture is a "tub-like" stone font with a lead bowl, dating from between 1200 and 1250 and standing at the west end of the church. The wide bowl is supported on a thin pillar and has little decoration. Its shape is reminiscent of a chalice, and it was carved from sandstone quarried at nearby Pulborough.

== See also ==
- Grade I listed buildings in West Sussex
- List of churches preserved by the Churches Conservation Trust in Southeast England
- List of places of worship in Horsham (district)
