= Tortington =

Village and parish in West Sussex, England

Coordinates: 50.83517°N 0.57658°W

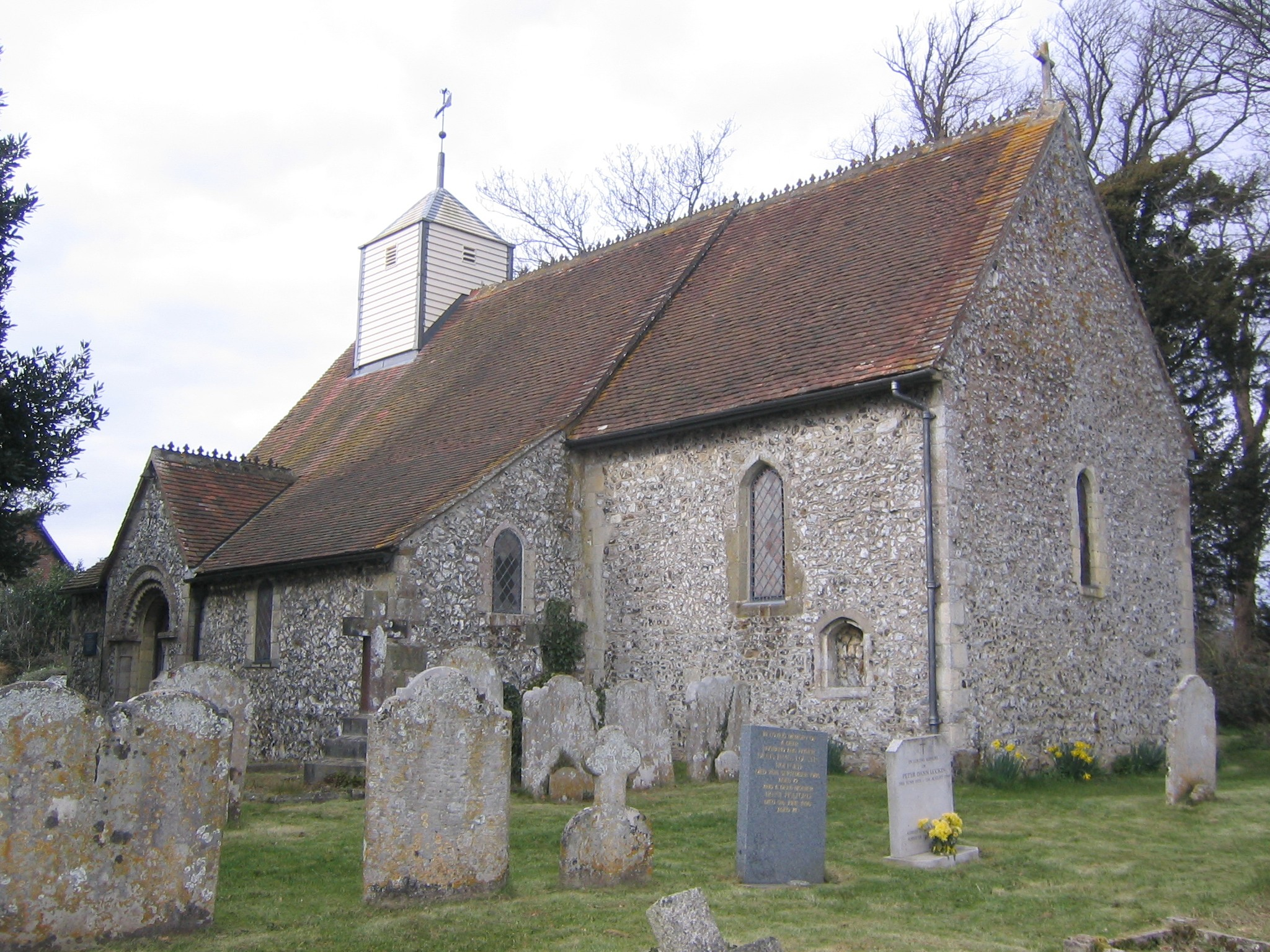
- St Mary Magdalene's Church

- Location within West Sussex
- OS grid reference: TQ003049
- Civil parish: Arundel
- District: Arun
- Shire county: West Sussex
- Region: South East
- Country: England
- Sovereign state: United Kingdom
- Post town: ARUNDEL
- Postcode district: BN18
- Dialling code: 01903
- Police: Sussex
- Fire: West Sussex
- Ambulance: South East Coast
- UK Parliament: Arundel and South Downs

Tortington is a small village and former civil parish, now in the parish of Arundel, in the Arun district of West Sussex, England. It lies between the Arundel to Ford and the Arundel to Chichester roads, 1.6 miles (2.6 km) southwest of Arundel. In 1961 the parish had a population of 617. On 1 April 1985 the parish was abolished and merged with Arundel, Ford, Slindon and Walberton.

== History ==
Before the Norman Conquest of 1066 the farmland of Tortington was tilled by an Anglo-Saxon freeman called Leofwine. By the time William's commissioners visited this part of Sussex just twenty years later to sit in the shire court and evaluate property for the great Domesday Survey, there were 8 households in the settlement. The land (plough land, woodland and 30 acres of meadows), in the Hundred of Binsted, was worked by Ernucion, also a freeman but a tenant of Earl Roger de Montgomery, whose loyal service to the Conqueror had been rewarded by the granting of huge tracts of land throughout England. Those lands included manors near Arundel in Sussex.

A church was built here sometime after the Domesday Book of 1086, and certainly before 1150 when a church was first recorded. By 1290 the church was recorded as a vicarage, the incumbents from this date onwards, with only a few exceptions, being described as vicars. In 1380 the nearby Augustine Priory acquired the benefice and the right to appoint clergy to the parish church and like the Priory, it was dedicated to St Mary Magdalene.

=== The parish ===
From these early foundations until the 20th century, the history of the parish is closely linked to those of the church, the priory, the manor and the Earls of Arundel. A complex history of conveyances, grants, gifts and titles caused the land at Tortington to change hands many times, particularly after the Dissolution of the Monasteries (see the Manor of Tortington below). At some time in its early history it may have had a dual dedication as the parish, even as late as the 1901 UK census, was sometimes referred to as the Parish of St Thomas, Tortington, and the church similarly dedicated and named.

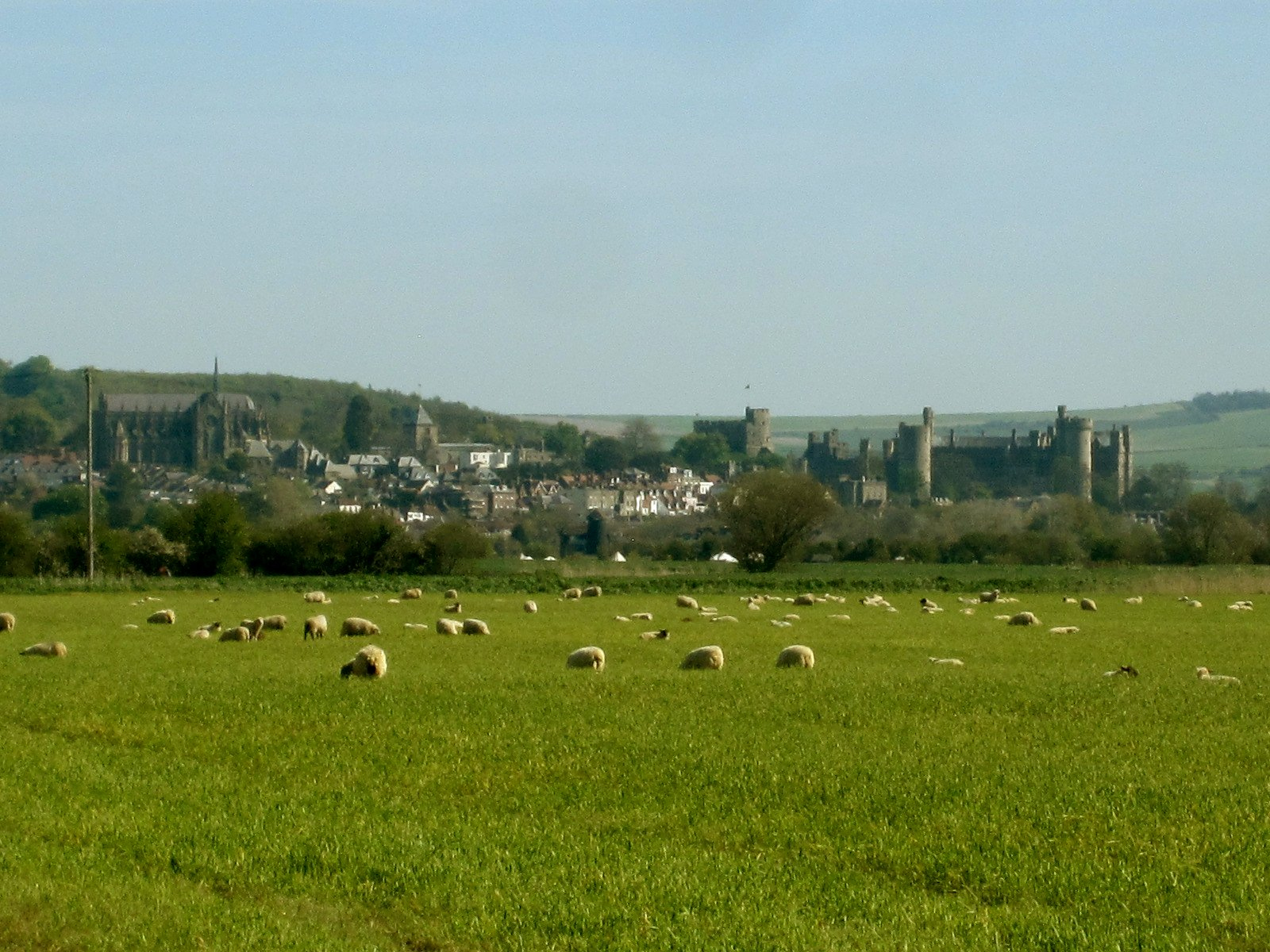
A view from Tortington across the Arun Valley towards Arundel (Arundel Castle at right)

The ancient parish of St. Mary Magdalene, Tortington was united with those of St. Nicholas's, Arundel and St. Leonard's, South Stoke in 1929, though declared redundant in 1978.

Tortington village population, now in the region of 150, has grown largely by the conversion of Tortington House, formerly Tortington Park School and later New England College, to residential dwellings in 2001 when it was renamed Tortington Manor. This population figure means that Tortington, against all other demographic trends in south-east England, is around the same size that it was between 1901 and 1931.

=== The Manor of Tortington ===
In the Domesday Survey of 1086 the manor of Tortington was assessed as having 3 hides, enough to support 2 plough teams, 6 villeins and 2 cottagers. In addition, the manor also had 30 acres of meadow and woodland grazing for 6 hogs. Through the collection of a tithe the church would have had a modest income.

As a manor in the Rape of Arundel, an ancient administrative unit of land-holding unique to Sussex, Tortington was part of the reward from William the Conqueror to Earl Roger de Montgomery for loyal service. However, Earl Roger's son Robert de Bellême later became embroiled in a dispute with Henry I who stripped him of his title and lands. Then, around 1105, Henry ennobled William d'Aubigny as 1st Earl of Arundel and gave him Robert's Sussex lands, including the manor of Tortington.

Hugh d'Aubigny, the 5th Earl, died without issue in 1243 and the king allowed the earldom and title to lapse. However Hugh's sister had married John FitzAlan and the Rape of Arundel now passed to their son, also John FitzAlan. Fifty years later his descendant Richard FitzAlan became 1st Earl of Arundel when Edward I revived the earldom and its title. So began a family association with town and title that continues to this day.

Meanwhile, ownership of the Tortington manor during the d'Aubigny and FitzAlan over-lordships in the Rape of Arundel was conveyed first to Pharamus de Tracey and his descendants, certainly by 1216, and later to William of Bracklesham. He in turn conveyed the manor to Ellis de Cheyney around 1295 after which it became known for a time as Tortington-Cheyneys.

On Ellis's death in 1327 his son and his widow Joan inherited the land, the latter selling her portion to Eleanor of Lancaster, niece of king Edward I and wife of Richard FitzAlan, now 3rd Earl of Arundel. With the sale to the FitzAlans in 1373 of the last portion of Tortington held independently of Arundel, the manor was once again under the lordship of the Earls of Arundel. However, in 1415 on the death of Thomas FitzAlan, the 5th Earl, Tortington manor was bequeathed to Holy Trinity Hospital, Arundel and there it remained until the Dissolution of the Monasteries in 1536 when once again it became the property of the Crown. However, soon after the sale and redistribution of church lands that followed the Dissolution, Tortington once again came into the possession of the FitzAlan family, only to be conveyed soon after to Roger Gratwick, whose descendants held the manor until the end of the 17th century and to whose memory a memorial window remains in the church. In 1706 Tortington manor came into the possession of William Leeves whose family remained lords of the manor until they sold it in 1790. With the title came the right to appoint clergy to the parish church and the Leeves family's close relationship with this office is reflected in several memorial plaques in the church. The demesne lands in the Rape of Arundel had been separated from Tortington manor in 1710 and although the Leeves family retained an interest in each of them, by 1790 the Duke of Norfolk, a descendant of the FitzAlan family, had acquired the manor his family had first become lords of more than 500 years earlier. The Leeves family eventually sold the demesne land in 1839 to John Smith of Madehurst and following several further transfers of ownership, in 1879 the Duke of Norfolk added the Tortington land to his Arundel Estate.

There were by now two principal farms in Tortington, Manor Farm and Priory Farm, both farmed by the Duke's tenants. Although the Arundel Estate retained woodland in Tortington, by the early 20th century those tenants had purchased their respective farms, thus bringing to an end almost one thousand years of manorial tenure. Since this time the land has been owned and farmed by the Luckin family, while privately owned woodland which makes up most of the remainder of the ancient parish is now within the boundary of the South Downs National Park.

== Tortington Priory ==
An Augustinian priory was founded at Tortington in the late-12th century on land held by the Norman Abbey of Sées. Half a mile north of St Mary Magdalene's church, it has often been said to have been founded to serve the Priory but the church in fact pre-dates the Priory by possibly 50 years, although the living of St Mary Magdalene was by 1389 in the gift of Tortington Priory.

The founder of the Priory was probably Alicia de Corbet, a widow and daughter of the d'Aubigny family who had once been a mistress of king Henry I. She was also reputedly devoted to Mary Magdalene and this became the priory's dedication as well as the church.

S.H. Grimm's depiction of Tortington Priory Barn, 1782.

For the 'Black Canons' who lived there it was a small establishment, not unlike other Augustinian priories founded nearby at Pyneham (de Calceto) just to the east of Arundel and at Hardham, further up the Arun valley. Occupied by only a Prior and four or five Canons at any one time, the Priory was given the advowson of church livings in Sussex, Dorset and London, including for a time that of St Mary Magdalene in Tortington. But successive visitations in the 15th and early 16th centuries reported a house in decay, lacking in books and whose servants were incompetent and unskilled. It gained a reputation as a house where errant monks were sent who were undeserving of a more prestigious or venerated establishment.

The religious house was dissolved soon after 1536, its goods sold off and the Priory sold to Lord Maltravers of Arundel within whose family it remained until the Catholic Howard family fell out of favour in the late-16th century. After this, though re-occupied for a time and known as Tortington Priory House, the old priory was plundered for building materials for several houses and farm buildings in the vicinity. This included a grand house nearby called Tortington Place, built in the 17th century by Roger Gratwick on the site where Tortington House would eventually be built.

What was left of the priory was by the late-18th century in use as a barn and so it remained until the late-20th century. When the property was bought in 1998 by Sir Arthur Watts what remained was little more than the nave wall of the Priory. His vision of conserving this and an enclosing wall of a courtyard and incorporating them in a private residence was realised in an award-winning building project carried out in 2001 by Neil Holland Architects of Arundel.

== The Church of St Mary Magdalene, Tortington ==
The nave and chancel of The Church of St Mary Magdalene, Tortington have been dated to the 1140s but many alterations have been made to the church subsequently. A south aisle and chapel were added in the 13th century only to be demolished sometime between the 16th and 18th centuries. In a major restoration undertaken in 1867 the south aisle was rebuilt causing the 12th century doorway to be re-sited for a third time. The south chapel was not rebuilt, an aumbry or recess used to house vessels and items for the sacrament being all that remains of the original chapel, this now being visible in the exterior wall. Some other alterations were made in the 16th century and later, notably the enlargement of the two north windows in the nave and the single east window in the chancel. The bellcote was also rebuilt in the 16th century.

Interior of St Mary Magdalene's Church, Tortington c.1920

During the 19th century restoration, funded by local farmer George Coote, the roofs were stripped and the chancel roof probably completely rebuilt. But the rafters and the beams of the nave are of medieval origin. The vestry was added in 1892 and the bellcote was rebuilt once again in 1904 by Philip Mainwaring Johnston, the architect and historian, to whose scholarship we owe much of our knowledge of this and other local churches.

Despite being dismantled and reassembled three times since it was first constructed in the 12th century, the Caen stone doorway shows surprisingly little damage or alteration. It features a double row of chevrons, one decorated with what appear to be grapes, inside an outer order of four-leaved emblems. The whole arch rests upon scallop capitals on the original shafts and the door itself is fitted with decorative strap hinges.

Inside the church and west of the doorway there is an unusual chalice-shaped Caen stone font, which, like the chancel arch, dates from the mid-12th century. With a cable moulding around the rim and an arcade of 12 round arches it is decorated with alternately inverted foliate emblems. The basin sits on a 19th-century plinth. The chancel arch, which also dates from the mid-12th century, is of an unusual design for south-east England. Adorned on the west side by grotesque 'beakhead' carvings, some bird-like, one certainly a rabbit, many topped with feathers, foliage or tentacles, these forms owe more to a Scandinavian or pagan tradition than to a Norman or Christian one. These creatures were originally brightly painted, to inspire awe and wonder, and no doubt fear, in the congregation praying below.

The nook shafts of the arch carry capitals decorated with foliage. Not quite perpendicular, there is evidence that the entire arch has been reconstructed to some degree at least once. The keystone bearing the inscription 'W F Leeves 1750' on the east side, and the Leeves family coat of arms on the west side, and indeed the 'beakhead' immediately above this stone, are almost certainly preventative repairs to the arch carried out in the 18th century.

There are three notable examples of stained glass in the church, all three being in windows that have been enlarged. The nave windows, one of St Richard and one of St Mary Magdalene, were made in 1896 by Charles Eamer Kempe – notice his trade-mark wheatsheaf in the bottom left-hand corner of the St Richard window. The east window, featuring the Lamb of God, roundels depicting the Four Evangelists and other religious and heraldic symbols has been attributed to Thomas Willement and dated to 1867. It is thought to be a copy of a much earlier painted window.

Two bells hang in the bellcote, one of which is engraved with the words 'S thomas treherne'. It has been suggested that this bell may have been taken from the nearby priory church soon after its desecration in the 16th century. But it may also be evidence of the church's original dedication to St Thomas alongside the name 'Treherne' who may have been either the maker or the donor of the bell. Since at least 1782 the turret, like that of nearby Ford church, has been boarded and painted white to provide a landmark for navigation on the river Arun.

Other notable fittings and artefacts include an early 15th-century bench, now in the south aisle; a 17th-century oak pulpit; a pair of 18th-century funeral hatchments of the Leeves family above the chancel arch; several personal and family memorials and a framed Roll of Honour and War Memorial to those Tortington men who served and died in the Great War 1914–18.

Amalgamation with the benefice of St Nicholas' in Arundel in 1897 and a dwindling congregation in the mid-20th century led to the church being declared redundant in 1978. And though it is now in the care of the Churches Conservation Trust, supported locally by the Friends of Tortington Church, St Mary Magdalene is still consecrated and several services are held here every year conducted by the vicar of St Nicholas', Arundel.

== The Roll of Honour and the War Memorial ==
Two documents in Tortington church survived from the period of the Great War (1914–1918). One was a roll of men serving in that war, the other a list of those who were killed.

One document calls on parishioners to ‘Pray for our men who are serving their King and Country at the Front’. This is followed by a hand-written list of fifty-two men, mostly in alphabetical order. Some of these men have letters after their names - W or M or P or RIP. The letters RIP are well known – Rest in Peace – but less obvious might be W for ‘wounded’, M for ‘missing’ and P for ‘prisoner of war’. The other document, headed by an image of the Crucifixion in a military cemetery, begins ‘From this parish the following gave their lives for King and Country during the war 1914 to …’. Then there are 4 hand-written names, followed by the date on which they died. Hand-written and clearly maintained over the course of the war, these historic documents are a record of the commitment and ultimate sacrifice of local men at a time of national emergency. They also bear witness to the strength and solidarity of the women on the home front who prayed as a community for the safe return of their husbands, sons and brothers. However we now know that the list of the dead was incomplete, one man, listed on the Roll of Honour as 'wounded and missing', had in fact been killed in action.

Those original documents were restored and conserved and have now been placed in the care of West Sussex Record Office. Officially recognised in 2008 as a War Memorial, two professionally reproduced facsimiles now hang in the south aisle of the church as a reminder of an almost forgotten rural Sussex community and its sacrifice.

== Woodland and wildlife ==
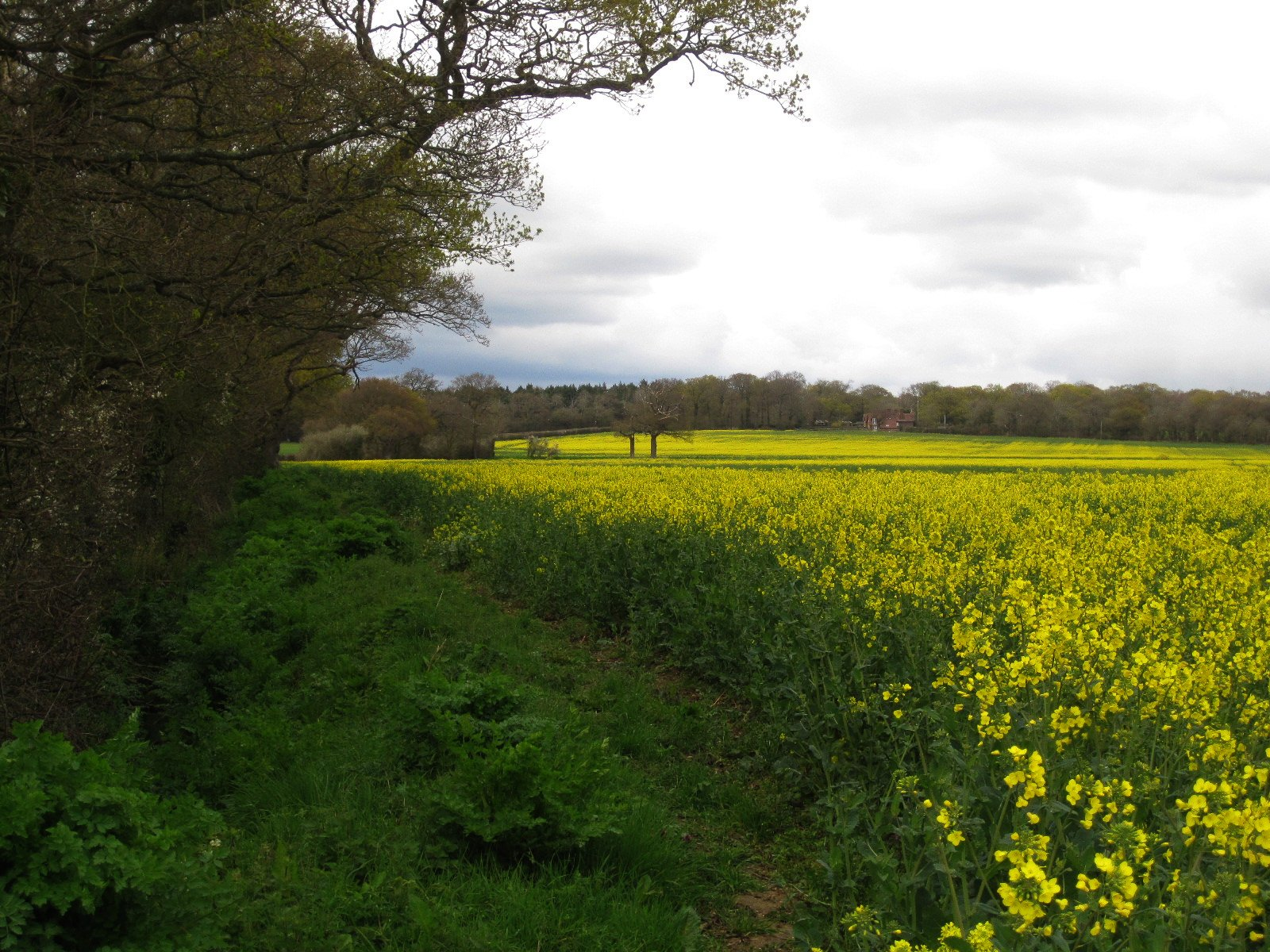
A view across Tortington farmland to the woodland boundary of the South Downs National Park

Around one-third of Tortington parish is designated ancient woodland.

It is here that one will find some rare and some endangered species such as the dormouse, the nightingale, the bee fly, the birds-nest orchid and the purple emperor butterfly. Tortington has a wide variety of habitats - woodland, open farmland, water meadows, river banks, ponds - and all have some wildlife classed as rare or even as endangered species. In the woods of Tortington the hazel dormouse population is being monitored by the Mid Arun Valley Environmental Survey (MAVES) who are also monitoring owls and bats in this, Areas 5 and 6 in the survey area. The woodland understorey has a variety of smaller floral species - early-purple and common spotted orchids, primrose, bluebell, wood anemones, wood sorrel and snakeshead fritillaries. Many of Tortington's numerous bluebell woods are beside public footpaths so can be viewed in April and May. A protected species, the common bluebell is also an indicator of ancient woodland.

Before the 15th century Tortington Common was an area of heathland which was then planted with mainly broad-leaved deciduous trees - oak, beech, elm, ash, and later with some conifers in the northern woods. By the 16th century it had become part of Arundel Great Park, a vast enclosed deer park, the southern gate of which existed where Knowle's Barn now is.

On the woodland fringes many deer emerge at dusk. Bats such as the common pipistrelle and the noctule also emerge to feed and later tawny owls can be heard and barn owls seen swooping on their prey. Over the farmland and the meadows down by the river a huge variety of birdlife is present. Buzzards can often be seen soaring high above, kestrels hover above the hedgerows, and skylarks can be heard in summer months. Closer to the ground little egrets are recent visitors to Tortington and in the water meadows by the river, swans, Canada geese, Brent geese, lapwings, pochards and shelducks visit. Fieldfares may be seen on farmland in winter, returning swallows in summer, and of course the cuckoo in spring. Common residents include blackcaps, nuthatches, green as well as great spotted woodpeckers and goldfinches.

== Bibliography ==
- Baggs, A.P, and Warne, H.M. 'Tortington', in A History of the County of Sussex: Volume 5 Part 1, Arundel Rape: South-Western Part, ed. Hudson, T.P., London, 1997.
- Boxgrove History Group and Luffingham, John (ed.). Tortington and the Black Canons, Philimore, 2002.
- Henderson, John. 'Tortington and the Great War', Friends of Tortington Church, 2014.
- Johnston, Philip M. (1909). "Tortington Church and Priory". Sussex Archaeological Collections. 52: 163–177. doi:10.5284/1086447.
- Nairn, Ian; Pevsner, Nikolaus (1965). The Buildings of England: Sussex. Harmondsworth: Penguin Books. ISBN 0-14-071028-0.
