= Robert Rydon =

English cricketer

Personal information
- Full name: Robert Anthony Rydon
- Born: 27 November 1964 (age 61); Greatham, Sussex, England
- Batting: Right-handed
- Bowling: Right-arm medium

Domestic team information
- Years: Team
- 1986–1987: Oxford University

Career statistics
Competition	First-class
Matches	6
Runs scored	72
Batting average	8.00
100s/50s	–/–
Top score	20
Balls bowled	792
Wickets	6
Bowling average	86.33
5 wickets in innings	–
10 wickets in match	–
Best bowling	3/106
Catches/stumpings	2/–
- Source: Cricinfo, 22 June 2020

Robert Anthony Rydon (born 27 November 1964) is an English former first-class cricketer.

Rydon was born in November 1964 at Greatham, Sussex. He was educated at Sherborne School, before going up to Pembroke College, Oxford. While studying at Oxford, Rydon played first-class cricket for Oxford University in 1986 and 1987, making six appearances. Rydon scored 72 runs in his six matches, with a high score of 20. With his right-arm medium pace bowling, he took 6 wickets at an expensive average of 86.33 and best figures of 3 for 106.

After graduating from Oxford, Rydon became an investment manager. He began his career at James Capel Investment Management, before joining Merrill Lynch. He joined Cazenove in 2010 as a portfolio director.
