= St John the Evangelist's Church, Chichester =

St John the Evangelist's Church
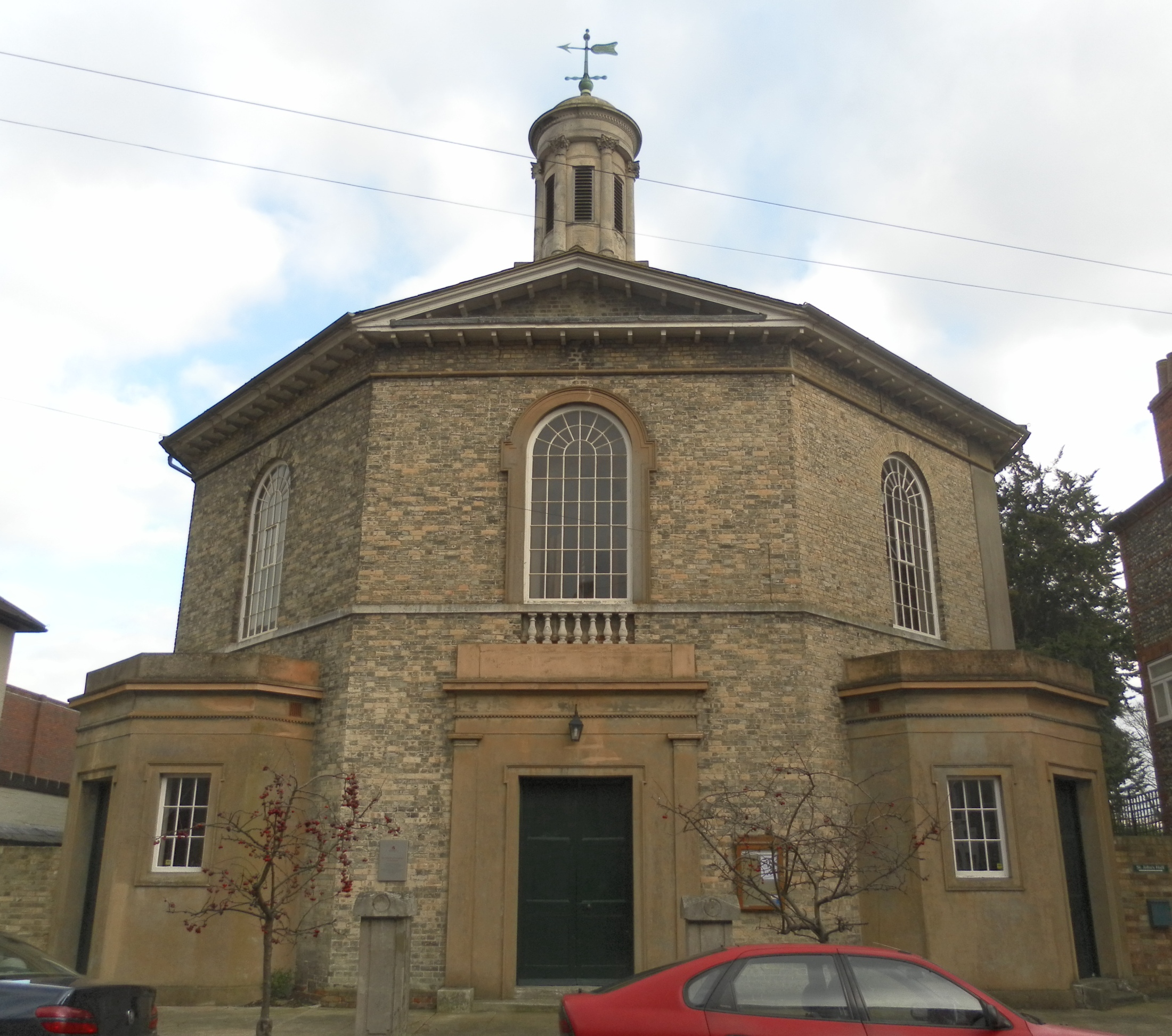
- The church from the west
- St John the Evangelist's Church
- 50.8354°N 0.7749°W
- Location: St John's Street, Chichester, West Sussex PO19 1UR
- Country: England
- Denomination: Church of England

History
- Status: Proprietary chapel
- Founded: 1812
- Dedication: John the Evangelist
- Events: 1973: Declared redundant 1976: Placed in the care of the Redundant Churches Fund (now the Churches Conservation Trust)

Architecture
- Functional status: Redundant
- Heritage designation: Grade I
- Designated: 5 July 1950
- Architect: James Elmes
- Style: Greek Revival/Classical
- Completed: 1813

St John the Evangelist's Church is a redundant Anglican church in the cathedral city of Chichester in West Sussex, England. Built in 1812 to the design of James Elmes as a proprietary chapel, the octagonal white-brick "evangelical preaching house" reflects the early 19th-century ideals of the Church of England's evangelical wing before High church movements such as the Cambridge Camden Society changed ideas on church design. The Diocese of Chichester declared it redundant in 1973. Although worship no longer takes place in the building, its theatre-like design has made it a popular venue for concerts and musical events. The church is a Grade I Listed building.

== History ==
Chichester, the county town of West Sussex, is an ancient settlement at the junction of several Roman and medieval roads. Roman walls encircle the heart of the city, which is divided into quadrants by straight streets with a market at the centre. Its cathedral, the seat of the Bishop of Chichester, makes Chichester a major ecclesiastical centre, as well as an important commercial and administrative centre.

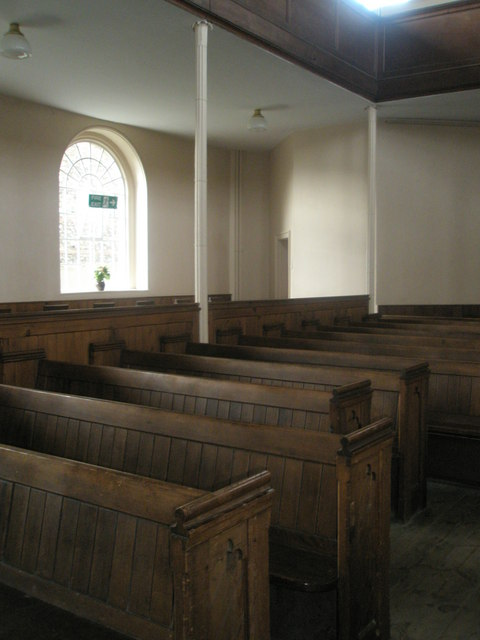
There are ground-floor pews and more in the galleries above.

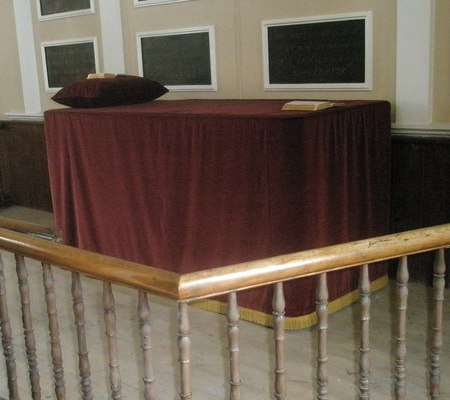
The church has a very modest altar.

Within the city walls there were eight medieval or older parish churches, including the 13th-century All Saints-in-the-Pallant, St Andrew Oxmarket and St Olave's. The southeastern quarter of the city centre, site of an ancient friary, was mostly developed in the 18th century and became known as New Town. It lacked an Anglican church until the early 19th century. At that time, a combination of urban growth throughout Sussex, the challenge posed by the rise of Protestant Nonconformism, and new ideas about the style of Anglican worship—which were closely linked with different styles of architecture—"gave rise to an unprecedented wave of churchbuilding". Many were funded by the government (by way of the Church Building Act), diocesan organisations and national societies; but in some areas, particularly Sussex, private fundraising was a popular alternative method of getting churches built. The proprietary system involved the purchase of shares in the church by private individuals, who received in exchange a "sitting" (the right to own a pew). The shareholders, known as proprietors, could use this pew for themselves and worship at the church, or sell it or rent it out. In some cases, an admission fee was levied on visitors who were not proprietors of the church. Some of the income from this process would support the curate and any clerks or other ministers. A minority of pews were free: they were kept aside for poor local worshippers.

This method was followed in Chichester, where St John the Evangelist's Church was founded in 1812 by a group of trustees who wanted a church in the southeastern quadrant. They commissioned 30-year-old architect James Elmes to design the proprietary chapel. He was ill during the design and building process, so the project was overseen on his behalf by John Haviland, an architect who was at the start of his career and who later became a prominent prison designer in the United States.

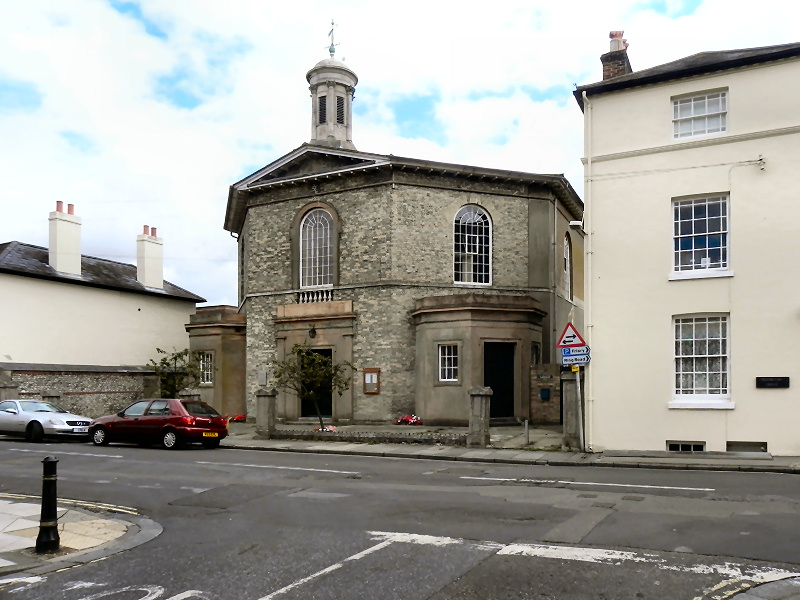
The chapel was built on an octagonal plan.

At the time, ideas about Anglican church design were starting to split along ideological and theological lines. The High church movement demanded formality and ritual, placed central importance of the Eucharist and was less concerned about preaching; its churches reflected this by favouring the Gothic Revival architectural style and features, large central altars and lavish decoration. The Low church or Evangelical wing of Anglicanism emphasised preaching, personal belief and an absence of ritual. St John the Evangelist's Church was designed according to an "extreme Low church plan" in which an enormous central pulpit was the focus for the congregation and the altar was so insignificant that it "dwindled to a kind of kitchen table". The height and prominence of the pulpit ensured that the preacher could see all worshippers, and they could see and hear him. The church, an elongated octagon in the Classical style with some Greek Revival features, was built of white brick and cost £7,000 (£430,000 in 2025). It was opened in 1813, and served the local area for more than 160 years thereafter. It later passed into the control of the Diocese of Chichester, the local Anglican diocese; but falling attendances caused the church to be declared redundant in 1973. Three years later, it was transferred into the care of the Redundant Churches Fund—now the Churches Conservation Trust. It is still consecrated and holds occasional services.

== Architecture ==
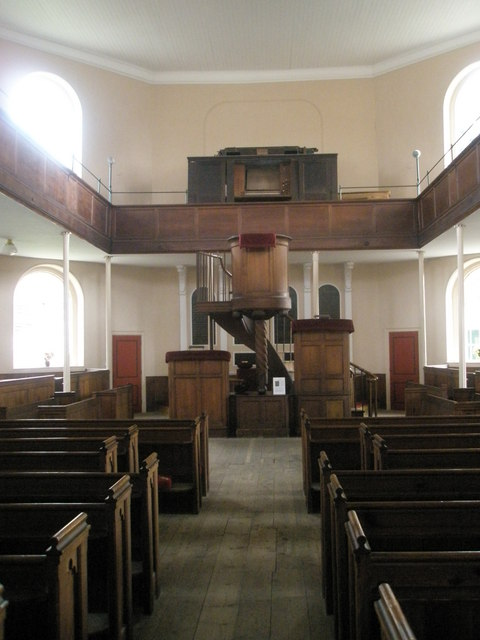
The Low church-style proprietary chapel has a very large wooden pulpit and galleries at first-floor level.

St John the Evangelist's Church is a broadly Classical-style building with some Greek Revival and Egyptian Revival elements, and is characteristic of a late Georgian "auditory church" (one set up for preaching and evangelising) designed according to Low church principles. Sussex church historian David Beevers, writing in 1989, noted that "the survival of this typical Georgian Low-church interior from the enthusiasts of the [High church] Cambridge Camden Society [who dominated church design later in the 19th century] is surprising". Ian Nairn had the same view, calling its survival a mystery. The "severely elegant" and simple design is more reminiscent of a Nonconformist chapel than an Anglican church.

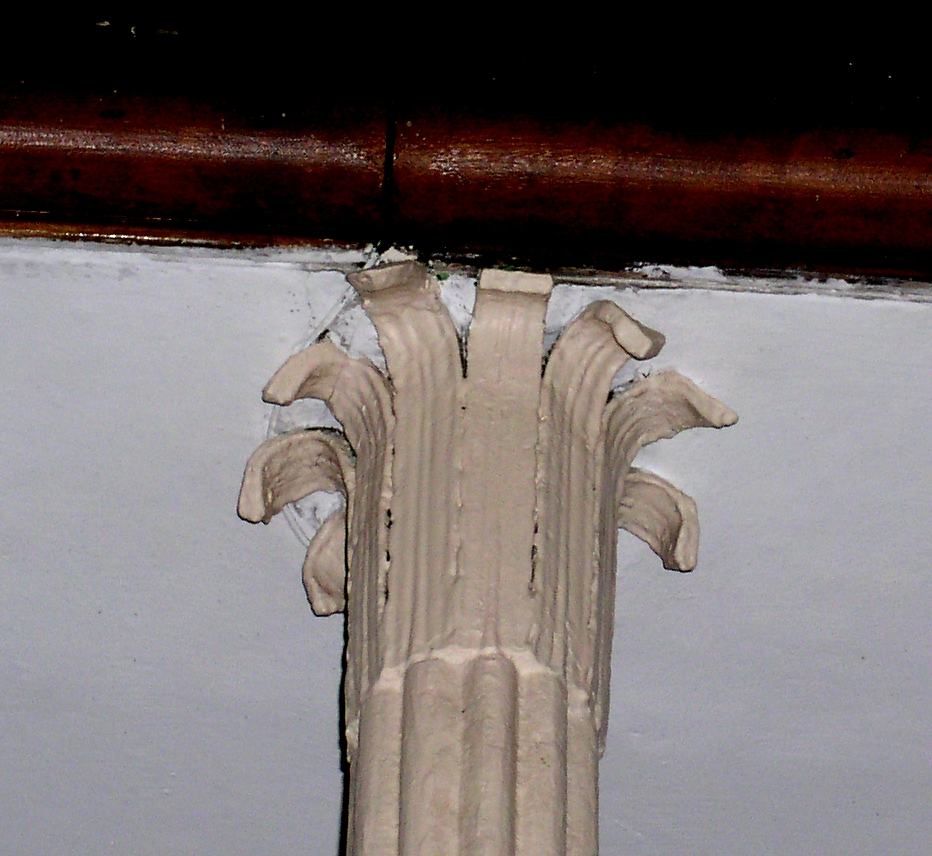
One of the capitals on the columns supporting the gallery.

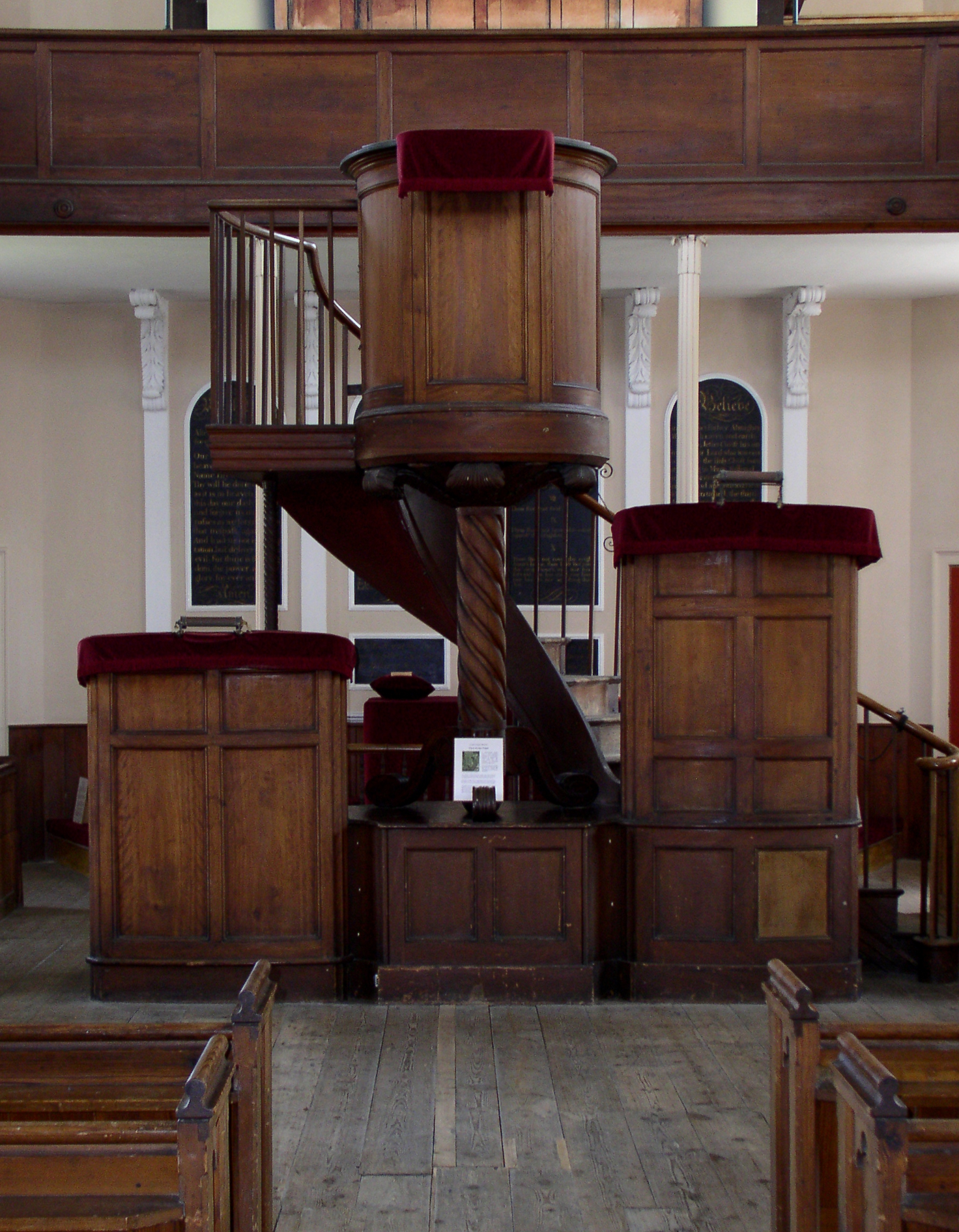
Each deck of three-decker pulpit was used in a different part of the service.

The exterior walls of the elongated octagonal building are of yellowish-white brick covered in parts with stucco. There are some stone dressings as well. A curious external feature is a miniature copy of the Choragic Monument of Lysicrates forming a sort of cupola on the roof, and described variously as "preposterous" and "excellent". This stone structure is shaped like a cylinder and has a spherical roof set on top of an entablature held up by Corinthian-style columns. Inside is a bell cast in London in 1813 by Thomas Mears II of the Whitechapel Bell Foundry. The entrance, in the west-facing wall, sits below a stone entablature with a stone-pilastered doorcase. Above this is a round-arched stone-dressed window with mouldings, linked to the entablature by a stone balustrade. Above the window is a stone pediment. Arched windows to a similar design are on each of the other seven walls at first-floor level. The entrance is flanked by two single-storey rooms which accommodate staircases to the first-floor galleries.

Inside, the most prominent features are these galleries, which form a rectangle and are held up on Egyptian-style iron columns, and the large pulpit, which "towers over everything". The layout and these fittings "represent a unique survival" and a "superb example" of a late Georgian style which was quite common in the early 19th century, particularly in Nonconformist chapels but also in Anglican churches with a Low church character. The galleries are of American birch and are reached by staircases which have separate entrances in the single-storey wings to the side of the main entrance. Separate entrances were characteristic of churches of this era, which often required the sexes to sit apart; also, at St John the Evangelist's Church, the free pews (on the ground floor) were kept separate from those owned by the proprietors (in the galleries). The pulpit stands centrally in the nave, hiding the small chancel and sanctuary. It has been called the best surviving three-decker pulpit in Sussex. An unusual refinement of the more common two-decker structure, a three-decker allowed different parts of the service to be read from different levels according to their importance. Responses to prayers were read from the lowest deck, usually by the church clerk. The main part of the service, including prayers, came from the middle deck; and the sermon—the most important part of a Low church service—took place in the circular upper deck. The pulpit is free-standing on a fluted stem with a spiral motif. Like the rest of the internal fittings, it is of American birch. The three sections are now side by side, but originally they were aligned one in front of the other in a tiered formation.

== The church today ==
St John the Evangelist's Church was designated a Grade I Listed building on 5 July 1950.

The Diocese of Chichester declared St John the Evangelist's Church redundant on 22 June 1973. It was placed into the care of the Redundant Churches Fund (now the Churches Conservation Trust) on 17 August 1976, and is now one of five former churches in West Sussex administered by the charity; the others are at Church Norton, North Stoke, Tortington and Warminghurst. The church had a strong musical tradition, which is maintained in the 21st century by its regular use as a concert venue—especially during the annual Chichester Festivities arts and music festival.

== See also ==
- Grade I listed buildings in West Sussex
- List of churches preserved by the Churches Conservation Trust in Southeast England
- List of former places of worship in Chichester (district)
- Egyptian Revival architecture in the British Isles
