= Greatham, West Sussex =

Village in West Sussex, England

Coordinates: 50.934°N 0.516°W

Greatham
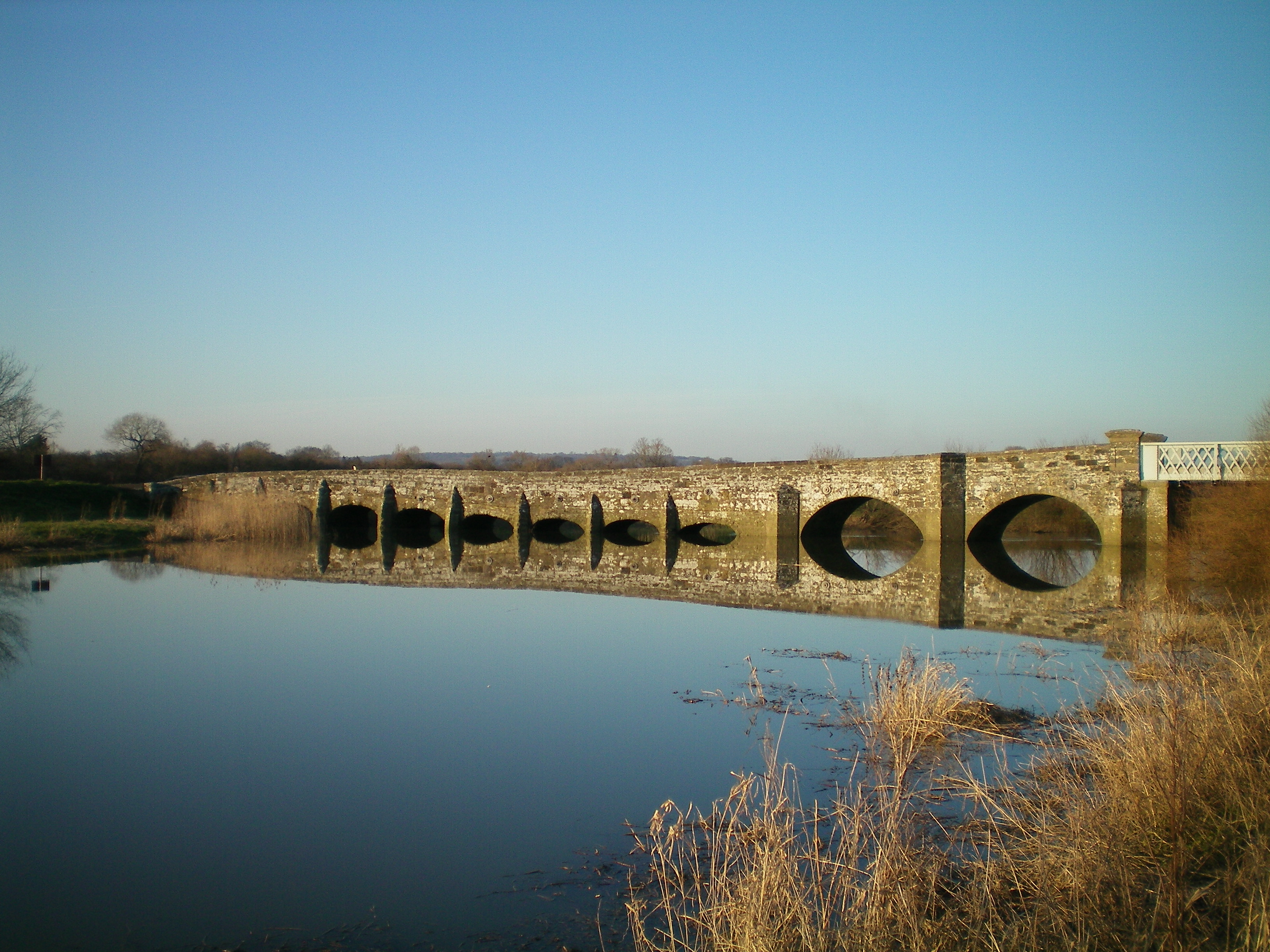
- Greatham Bridge

- Location within West Sussex
- OS grid reference: TQ043159
- Civil parish: Parham
- District: Horsham
- Shire county: West Sussex
- Region: South East
- Country: England
- Sovereign state: United Kingdom
- Police: Sussex
- Fire: West Sussex
- Ambulance: South East Coast
- UK Parliament: Arundel and South Downs

Greatham (/ˈɡrɛtəm/ GRET-əm) is a small village and former civil parish, now in the parish of Parham, in the Horsham district of West Sussex, England. It lies on the Coldwaltham to Storrington road about 2 miles (3 km) south of Pulborough. In 1931 the parish had a population of 55.

== History ==
The Domesday Book of 1086 records the place village as Gretham. The toponym is recorded as Gretheam in 1121 and Gruteham later in the 12th century. The first element in the name means "gravel"; the second is uncertain, and could mean either "village, estate, manor, homestead", "meadow, especially a flat, low-lying meadow on a stream", or "an enclosed plot, a close". A 10th century gold and enamel ring was discovered near Greatham in 2021.

Greatham Bridge was built for Sir Henry Tregoz in the early 14th century. The iron section was built after floods had damaged the bridge in 1838. A skirmish took place near the bridge during the English Civil War.

Early in the First World War Greatham inspired John Drinkwater's poem Of Greatham (to those who live there), which was published in his anthology Swords and Plough-shares.

On 1 April 1933 the parish was abolished and merged with Parham.

== Parish church ==
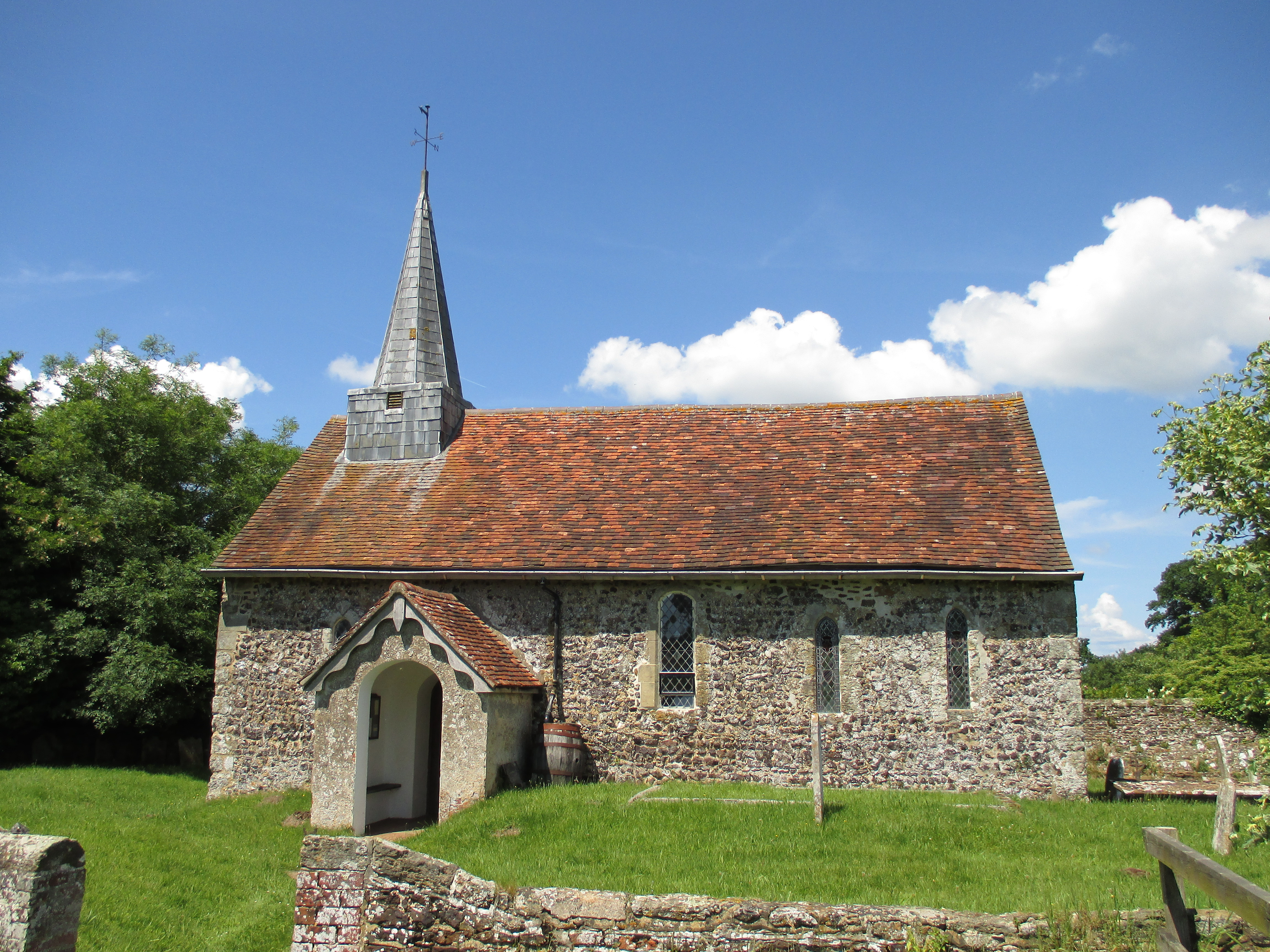
Greatham parish church

The undedicated small rectangular Church of England parish church is similar to Wiggonholt parish church, with which it often shared a priest in the Middle Ages. The rectangular single-room church has rubble ironstone walls which have mostly lancet windows and are probably 12th century. There is a slate-hung bell turret at the western end. Inside are an unusual double decker pulpit and a 17th-century altar rail.

== Notable people ==
- Wilfrid Meynell (1852–1948), publisher and editor, dead in Greatham
- Robert Rydon (born 1964), cricketer
