= North Stoke, West Sussex =

Village and parish in West Sussex, England

Coordinates: 50.8875°N 0.5510°W

North Stoke
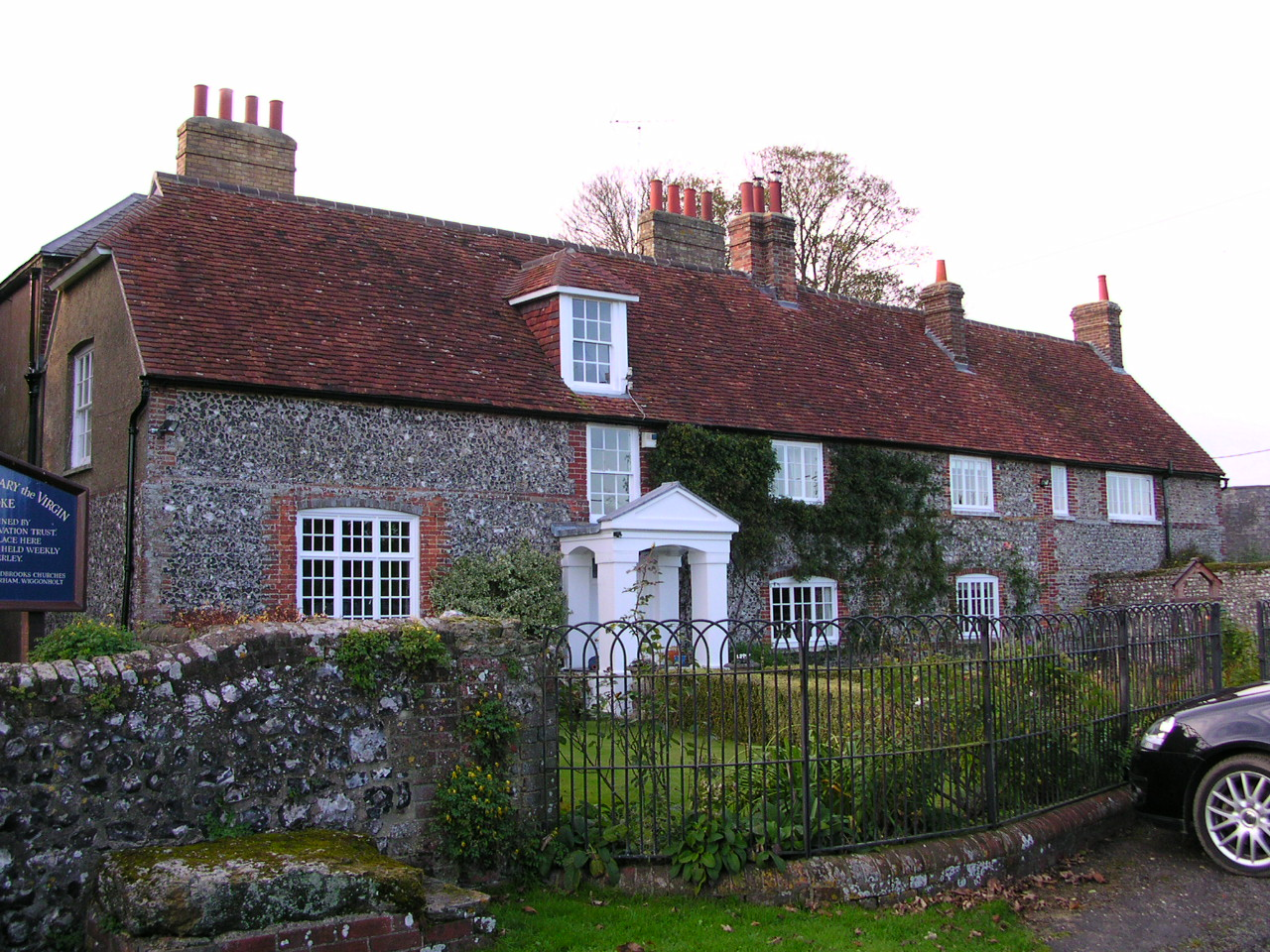
- North Stoke Farmhouse

- Location within West Sussex
- OS grid reference: TQ019107
- Civil parish: Amberley
- District: Horsham
- Shire county: West Sussex
- Region: South East
- Country: England
- Sovereign state: United Kingdom
- Post town: Arundel
- Postcode district: BN18
- Dialling code: 01798
- Police: Sussex
- Fire: West Sussex
- Ambulance: South East Coast
- UK Parliament: Arundel and South Downs

North Stoke is a village and former civil parish, now in the parish of Amberley, in the Horsham district of West Sussex, England. It is just over 2 miles (3 km) north of Arundel and 0.7 miles (1 km) south of Amberley railway station, and is at the end of a no through road from the station. In 1931 the parish had a population of 70. On 1 April 1933 the parish was abolished and merged with Amberley.

== Geography ==
The village is on a spur of slightly higher ground on the east bank of a loop of the River Arun, surrounded by water meadows. It is in the middle of the gap eroded through the South Downs by the River Arun. Another small settlement on the west bank, South Stoke is about 0.5 miles (1 km) to the south east and can be reached by a footpath and a footbridge over the river. A suspension bridge on the path was rebuilt by British Army Gurkhas in 2009 after being damaged by a falling tree.

== Manor ==
North Stoke is a medieval village, recorded in the Domesday Book of 1086. It has lost most of its population, possibly due to Black Death in the Middle Ages or because the landowner preferred to enclose the land for sheep pasture. This has left a notable example of a Norman and Early English Gothic church, which is Listed Grade I.

== Parish church ==
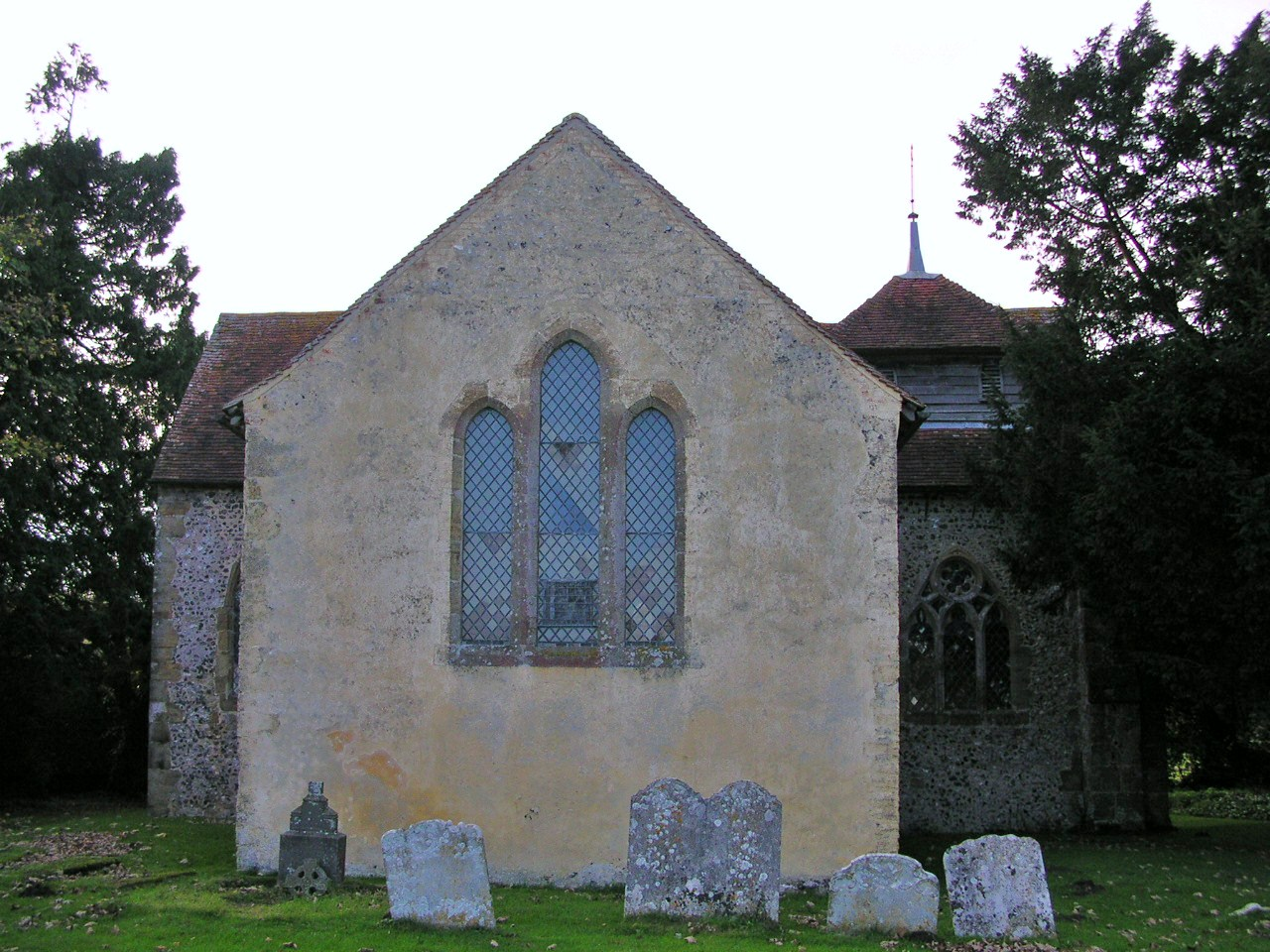
St. Mary the Virgin parish church, whose dedication was rediscovered in 2007

The Church of England parish church of the Virgin Mary is now redundant and maintained by the Churches Conservation Trust. It is a Grade I listed building. The church's dedication had been long forgotten but in 2007 it was rediscovered from a scrap of a vellum letter dated 1275 from Stephen Bersted, Bishop of Chichester to Edward I. The church was accordingly rededicated to the Virgin Mary in December 2007.
