= South Stoke, West Sussex =

Village and parish in West Sussex, England

Coordinates: 50.88021°N 0.54279°W

South Stoke
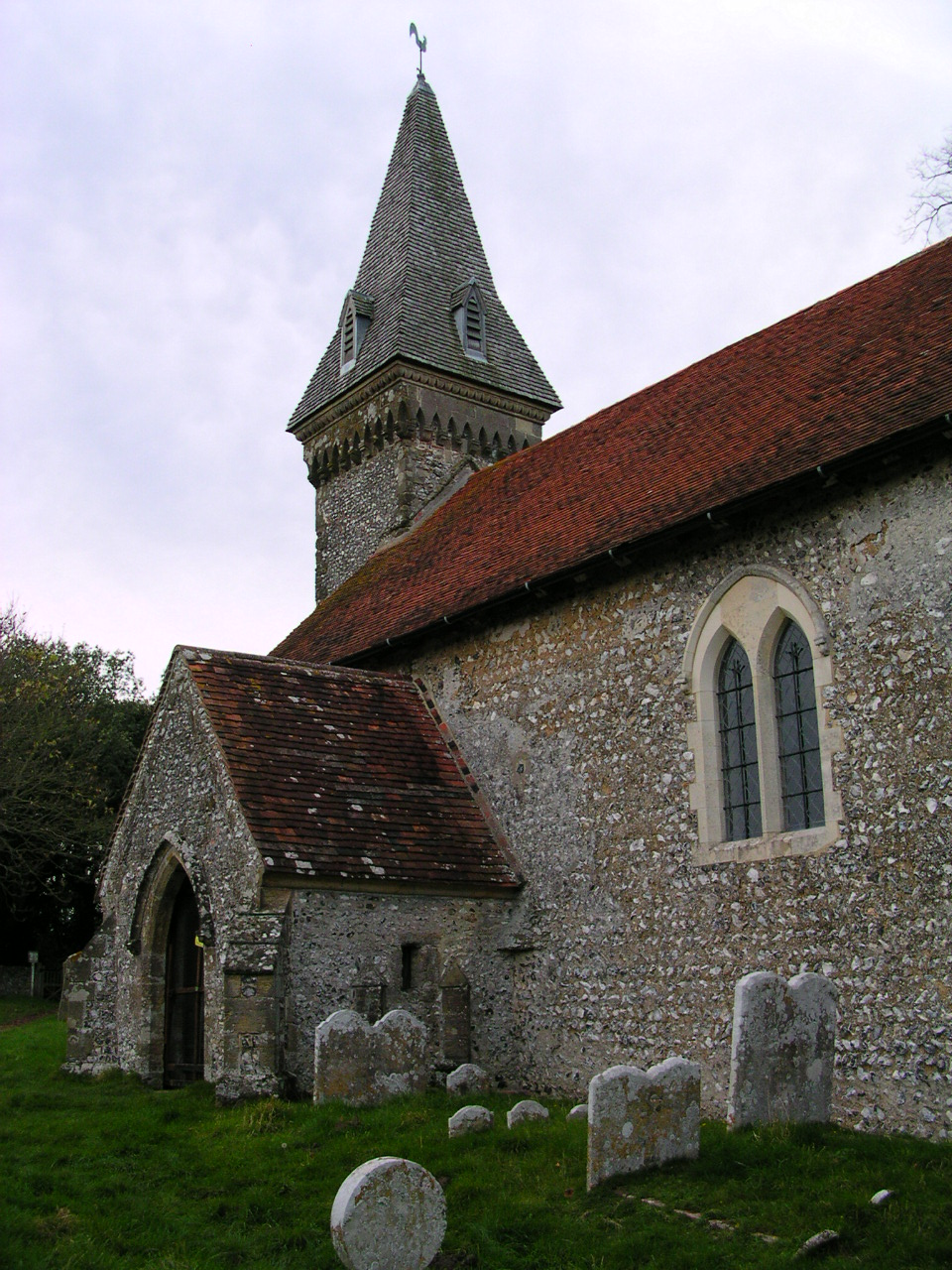
- South Stoke Church

- Location within West Sussex
- Area: 5.35 km^{2} (2.07 sq mi)
- Population: 44 (Civil Parish)
  - Density: 8/km^{2} (21/sq mi)
- OS grid reference: TQ026099
  - London: 47 miles (76 km) NNE
- Civil parish: South Stoke
- District: Arun
- Shire county: West Sussex
- Region: South East
- Country: England
- Sovereign state: United Kingdom
- Post town: ARUNDEL
- Postcode district: BN18
- Dialling code: 01903
- Police: Sussex
- Fire: West Sussex
- Ambulance: South East Coast
- UK Parliament: Arundel and South Downs

South Stoke is a rural village and civil parish in the Arun District of West Sussex, England. It is centred two miles (3 km) north of Arundel also on the west bank of the River Arun and on the edge of Arundel Park. It is reached by road, footpath or river from Arundel. A footpath also leads to North Stoke on the east bank. The civil parish, which includes the hamlet of Offham, covers an area of 534.86 hectares (1,321.7 acres). At the 2011 Census the population of the village was included in the civil parish of Houghton.

The parish church, Saxon in origin, is dedicated to St Leonard. Offham has a large pub.

== History ==
Offham was listed in the Domesday Book of 1086 as having 18 households, comprising 8 villagers, 5 cottagers and 5 slaves, with plough land, woodland, a fishery and two mills, all valued at 8 pounds 10 shillings. South Stoke itself had 14 households and a church valued at 4 pounds. Human population reverted to medieval levels after 1806 when common land was enclosed to make Arundel Park, depriving unlanded villagers of sheep-grazing land. Some of this was returned to woodland after a few centuries of being used as pasture.

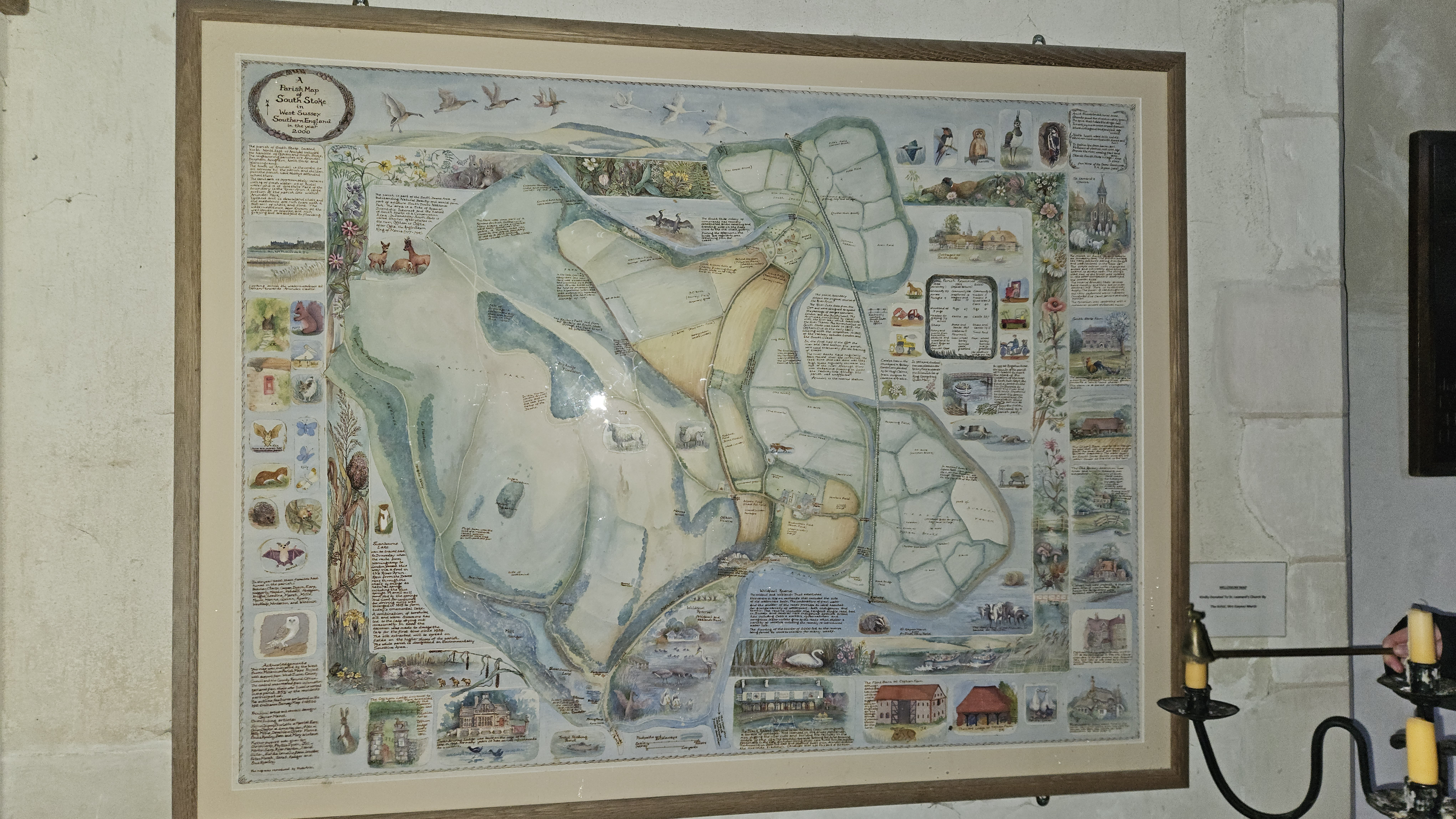
Illustrated map of South Stoke located on the north wall of the parish church, 2000.

== Amenities ==
Offham has a pub with outdoor seated area, the Black Rabbit.

The Monarch's Way long-distance footpath crosses the western edge of the parish between Houghton and Arundel.

== In film, the media and fiction ==
Offham is the setting for Michael de Larrabeiti's 2003 novel Foxes' Oven, set in 1940.

== The parish church ==
The 11th-century building is recorded in the Domesday Book, when the village was named as "Stoches". Built of flint it has a thin western tower which carries a 19th-century broach spire with four slatted dormer windows. There is one bell dated 1657. The porch is 13th century.
