= Copnall =

Copnall is a surname. Notable people with the surname include:

- Edward Bainbridge Copnall (1903–1973), British sculptor and painter
- Jenny Copnall (born 1975), English cyclist
- John Copnall (1928–2007), English artist
- Teresa Copnall (1882–1972), British painter
