= College of Richard Collyer =

The College of Richard Collyer
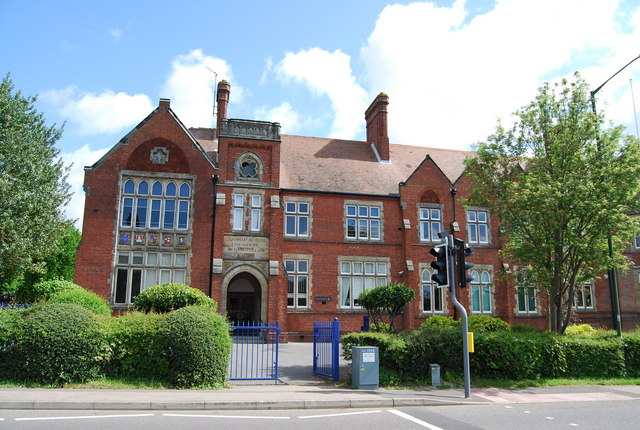

Location
- Hurst Road; Horsham, West Sussex, RH12 2EJ; United Kingdom; 51.071°N 0.324°W

Information
- Type: Sixth Form College
- Motto: Honor Deo (Honour to God)
- Established: 1532; 494 years ago
- Founder: Richard Collyer
- Local authority: West Sussex
- Department for Education URN: 130847 Tables
- Ofsted: Reports
- Principal: Dan Lodge
- Gender: Mixed
- Age: 16 to 19
- Enrolment: 2100
- Houses: Denne, Mercers', Pirie, Richmond, St. Leonard's, Whittington
- Former pupils: Old Collyerians
- Website: collyers.ac.uk

The College of Richard Collyer (colloquially Collyer's /ˈkɒliəz/), formerly called Collyer's School, is a co-educational sixth form college in Horsham, West Sussex, England. The college was rated as being 'excellent’ by Ofsted in 2025.

It is the second oldest school in West Sussex after The Prebendal School in Chichester and the fourth oldest school in Sussex. The college is Grade II listed by English Heritage.

== Admissions ==
Collyer's serves about 2100 students between 16 and 19 years of age. It offers A-level courses in 45 different subjects, including a selection not taught at other local colleges. 20 further subjects are offered towards BTEC and vocational certifications and GCSE examinations.

A wide variety of adult education classes are offered at Collyer's in the evenings. It is situated on the B2180 opposite Horsham Community Hospital, and close to the fire and police stations.

== History ==
The College was founded in 1532 (Old Style) in the will of Richard Collyer, who was born in Horsham, and became a wealthy member of The Mercers' Company of the City of London. The Mercers' Company are still the school's trustees, and maintain a close relationship with the school. Collyer willed that one of his houses in the City, variously called 'The Sonne' or 'The Sunne', be sold and the proceeds used to build a school-house in Horsham for "the nomber of thre score scholars". Under the terms of the will the money was not freed until 1540, and the new school was eventually opened in the early summer of 1541. The education granted to those sixty scholars, who were naturally all boys, was to be provided "freely without any money paying therefor", with the Mercer's Company paying the masters' salaries.

The original building was on the site of the current St Mary's Church of England Primary School, adjacent to the parish church. However, it was extended then rebuilt in 1660, in order to accommodate "neare an hundred scholars ... with diligence and good success" by 1666, such that none of Collyer's original structure survives. (Part of the 1660 building remains in structure of Arun House, in Denne Road.) In the eighteenth century it fell into disrepair, such that the Mercers' Company surveyor reported that it would cost £1,040 to renovate, "but you will still have a very old and imperfect building." Accordingly, in 1840 the second building was demolished (save for the part incorporated into Arun House), and a new, late-Elizabethan style structure built for the sum of £2,240.

=== Hurst Road Site ===
By the late nineteenth century, the population of Horsham had expanded to 10,000 (accelerated by the coming of the railway and its associated employment), the City and Guilds Institute (which the Mercers' Company had helped found) decreed that education needed to be extended to include the new sciences, and money needed to be found to replace the school buildings yet again. Thus after a long campaign against fees, including a petition of 1,100 signatures, the new school charter of 1889 stated that, "Tuition fees might vary between £4 and £10 p.a. and Boarding fees were not to exceed £40 a year." A new and larger site was sorely needed.

The present site in Hurst Road was found, and the current building was designed in 1892 by Arthur Vernon, and built by Joseph Potter in 1893 for a contract price of £5,795. It is now grade II listed by English Heritage. Above the entrance is a stone engraved with, "Grammar School, Founded by Richard Collier AD 1532". (Historically the founder's name was often spelled as 'Collier', but from the twentieth century it has always been spelled as it is today.) The 1892 building facing Hurst Road has been extended continually as the school has expanded. This included the addition of science laboratories in 1897, a 'Great Hall' in 1912, and the 'New Block' classrooms in 1932.

In the 1890s Collyer's taught 110 boys from ages 7 to 17, both boarders and day-schoolers, and for the first time included a sixth form to study for university entrance. In 1904, six graduates of the school held open awards at Oxford or Cambridge, and another was a City and Guilds scholar. From 1923 the Rev. W. M. Peacock started to model the school on public school lines, introducing (among other things) four houses (see below), The Horsham Grammar School Magazine (later to become The Collyerian), and a school song. By 1926 it was a single-stream school of 220 boys with a sixth form of "less than a dozen", and ten teaching staff.

=== Grammar school ===
Collyer's ceased to accept boarders in 1935, and the dormitories were converted into much-needed library and common-room space. Plans for adding a gymnasium and other facilities were abandoned in 1939, when the school accepted evacuees from the Mercers' School in London, and pupil numbers soared to over 400 in three streams. (The accommodation crisis was solved by building hutted classrooms, but numbers continued to rise because of the post-war 'baby boom', and the huts were not demolished until the 1980s.) In 1944 it became a voluntary-aided grammar school, and its education was again made available free to the scholars. In the 1950s it had around 500 pupils, rising slowly to over 600 during the 1960s. By 1962, when university education had been made free to students, the school sent 55 students out of 80 leavers into higher education.

In the early 1960s an Old Collyerian (OC), Dr. William W. Duckering (1861–1945) bequeathed £22,000 to the school "for its general purposes". The bequest paid for a new laboratory block, gymnasium and changing rooms in 1961, and an assembly and dining hall with theatrical stage facilities, modern kitchens attached, and a 'Small Upper Hall' above the new foyer, all completed in 1963. The new hall was named the 'Duckering Hall', and the smaller hall the 'Duckering Room'. (The final phase of building work, to be a new classroom block replacing the World War Two emergency wooden huts, was never undertaken.) Between 1960 and 1963 the playing fields were also extended, levelled, and new sports facilities were added. In 1964 a headmaster's house was built on the site, replacing the accommodation that was originally included in the 1892 school block.

In 2017, Neil Lyndon alleged that Douglas Coulson, who was principal from 1956 to 1964, had been "addicted to thrashing boys’ bottoms with bamboo canes," who had carried out at least one beating a week, and that "the institution he led crawled with both predatory and repressed homosexuals."

=== Sixth form college ===
It started its transition to become a voluntary-aided sixth form college in 1976. The other three state secondary schools in Horsham (Forest Boys, Forest Girls and Horsham High School for Girls) became comprehensives. Collyer's had taken its last first form intake in the previous September, and started to expand its sixth form. Initially this was done by taking students from the two existing secondary moderns to do O-levels, and girls from Horsham High School who wanted to study A-level choices that were not offered by their previous school.

In the early 2000s, annual reports from the Office for Standards in Education (OFSTED) have deemed the school outstanding. Following the 2021 inspection the 2022 report dropped the headline rating to 'Good'. On the strength of a recent OFSTED Grade One for Science provision, the college was awarded 'Beacon Status' for Science in 2005 by the Department for Education and Skills. In the same year, it achieved the status of Centre of Vocational Excellence (CoVE) for sport and recreation. A new £2 million, three storey Learning Resources Centre was unveiled during this period. In 2006 work began to extend the Sports Hall, or Cowley Building, to provide more teaching and social space.

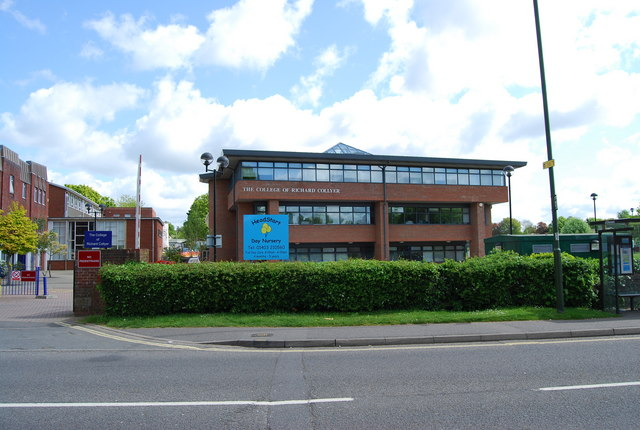
The £2 million Learning Resources Centre, 2009

=== Houses ===
From the 1920s the students and some teaching staff in the college have been divided into a number of different houses. All houses names are associated with the history of the college or the town. The current six houses are:

- Denne – after a local area of Horsham;
- Mercers' – after the Mercers' Company, a livery company based in London, a member of which founded the original school;
- Pirie – After William Pirie, a previous headmaster at the college, who served for 46 years and raised standards significantly in the college. There is a small square in the town centre known as Pirie's Place, with a sculpture of Pirie in a horse-drawn cart, commemorating the achievement of the headmaster;
- Richmond – After a road bordering the college;
- St Leonard's – After the forest to the east of Horsham;
- Whittington – After a member of the Mercer's company.

Former house names include Collyer's, Hurst, Garnett, Duckering, and Weald.

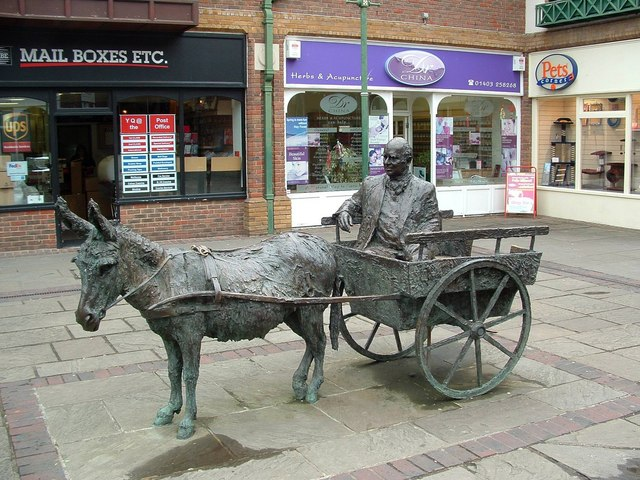
Sculpture of William Pirie, Piries Place, Horsham

=== Headmasters ===
The following list of the headmasters from the school's opening until 1965 was provided in the history of the school that was published in that year.

- 1541–1546 Richard Brokebanke
- 1546–1548 Nicholas Bayne
- 1549–1562 John Fowler
- 1563–1567 Thomas Hodeles
- 1567–1617 James Alleyn
- 1617–1629 Richard Nye (OC)
- 1629–1631 Edmund Pierson
- 1631–1639 Thomas Robinson
- 1640–1644 Rev. John Sefton
- 1644–1647 Rev. Thomas Smith
- 1647–1648 Rev. Alma Hogglebin
- 1648–1684 John Nisbet
- 1684–1685 Rev. Peregrine Peryham
- 1686–1699 Rev. James Wickliffe
- 1699 Rev. Ralph Grove
- 1700–1706 Rev. Alexander Hay
- 1706–1712 Rev. Thomas Pittis
- 1712 Rev. Peter Stockar
- 1712–1722 Rev. John Reynell
- 1722–1773 Rev. Francis Osgood
- 1773–1806 Rev. William Jameson
- 1806–1821 Rev. Thomas Williams
- 1822–1868 William Pirie
- 1868–1883 Richard Cragg (the younger)
- 1883–1890 James Williams
- 1890–1917 Rev. Dr. George Thompson
- 1917–1922 William Major
- 1922–1926 Rev. Canon Wilfrid Peacock
- 1922–1956 Philip Tharp
- 1956–1964 Douglas Coulson
- 1964–1966 Vernon Davies (acting head)
- 1966–1983 (Eldred) Derek Slynn

=== Principals ===
In 1976, the title was changed from Headmaster to Principal. Since then the college's principals have been:

- 1983–1999 David Arnold
- 1999–2004 Michael Marchant
- 2004–2014 Dr. Jacqueline Johnston
- 2014–2020 Sally Bromley
- 2020–present Dan Lodge

== Notable alumni ==
See Category:People educated at The College of Richard Collyer.

=== The College of Richard Collyer ===
- Alex Adair, DJ, producer and remixer
- Will Beer, first-class cricketer
- Devon Endersby, first-class cricketer
- Harry Enfield, contemporary British entertainer
- Angie Hobbs, Professor of the Public Understanding of Philosophy at the University of Sheffield
- Chris Nash, Sussex cricketer
- Hannah Stewart, Sculptor
- Holly Willoughby, TV presenter

=== Collyer's School ===
- Chris Aldridge, continuity announcer and newsreader for BBC Radio 4
- Wilfred Brown, tenor
- William Brown, president from 1951 to 1952 of the British Psychological Society, and director from 1936 to 1945 of the Institute of Experimental Psychology at Oxford University
- David Cummings, screenwriter and musician
- Saint Thomas Garnet (c.1575–1608), Jesuit priest and martyr
- Anthony Harnden, Professor of Primary Care at Oxford University, Deputy Chair of the JCVI since 2015, and Ig Nobel Prize-winner in 2020
- Simon Henley, former Royal Navy rear admiral, and former President of the Royal Aeronautical Society 2018–19
- Neil Lyndon, author and journalist
- Simon Nye, writer of Men Behaving Badly
- Paul Parker, Sussex cricketer
- Lt.-Col. George Styles GC, commanded the 28th Commonwealth Brigade's Ordnance Field Park Regiment from 1958 to 1961, and bomb disposal expert in Northern Ireland in the 1970s
- Rajesh Thakker FRS, Professor of Medicine at Oxford University
- Eric Thompson, actor, and voice of The Magic Roundabout
- David Westwood, Chief Constable from 1999 to 2005 of Humberside Police
