= George Bax Holmes =

English fossil collector (1803–1887)

George Bax Holmes (3 May 1803 – 31 March 1887) was an English fossil collector. Born into a wealthy Quaker family in Horsham, Sussex, he was the discoverer of the 'Great Horsham Iguanodon'. Having started life pursuing a medical career he was able to devote more time to his fossil hunting from 1834. It was in that year that his father died and left him considerable property interests. As early as 1836 he contributed to Howard Dudley's history of Horsham with a paragraph on his work.

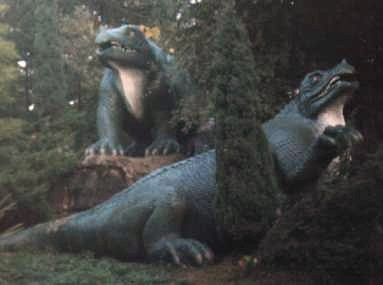
The Grade I Iguanodon sculptures still on display in Crystal Palace Park South London, though no longer considered an accurate reconstruction from the fossils

== Religion ==
Bax Holmes was born in Horsham on 3 May 1803, the first son of Joseph Holmes, an active Quaker. He was married on 19 October 1826 to his third cousin Mary Burns of Chichester at which time his occupation was recorded as "chemist and druggist" of Horsham.

As a Quaker in these times Bax Holmes was still regarded as a dissenter from the mainstream Church of England, even though the religious Act of Toleration had been passed in 1689. In 1834, for refusing to pay the church rates of 4s 10½d (2007: £19) he had two arm chairs valued at £3 9s 0d (2007: £276) removed.

== Fossil collecting ==
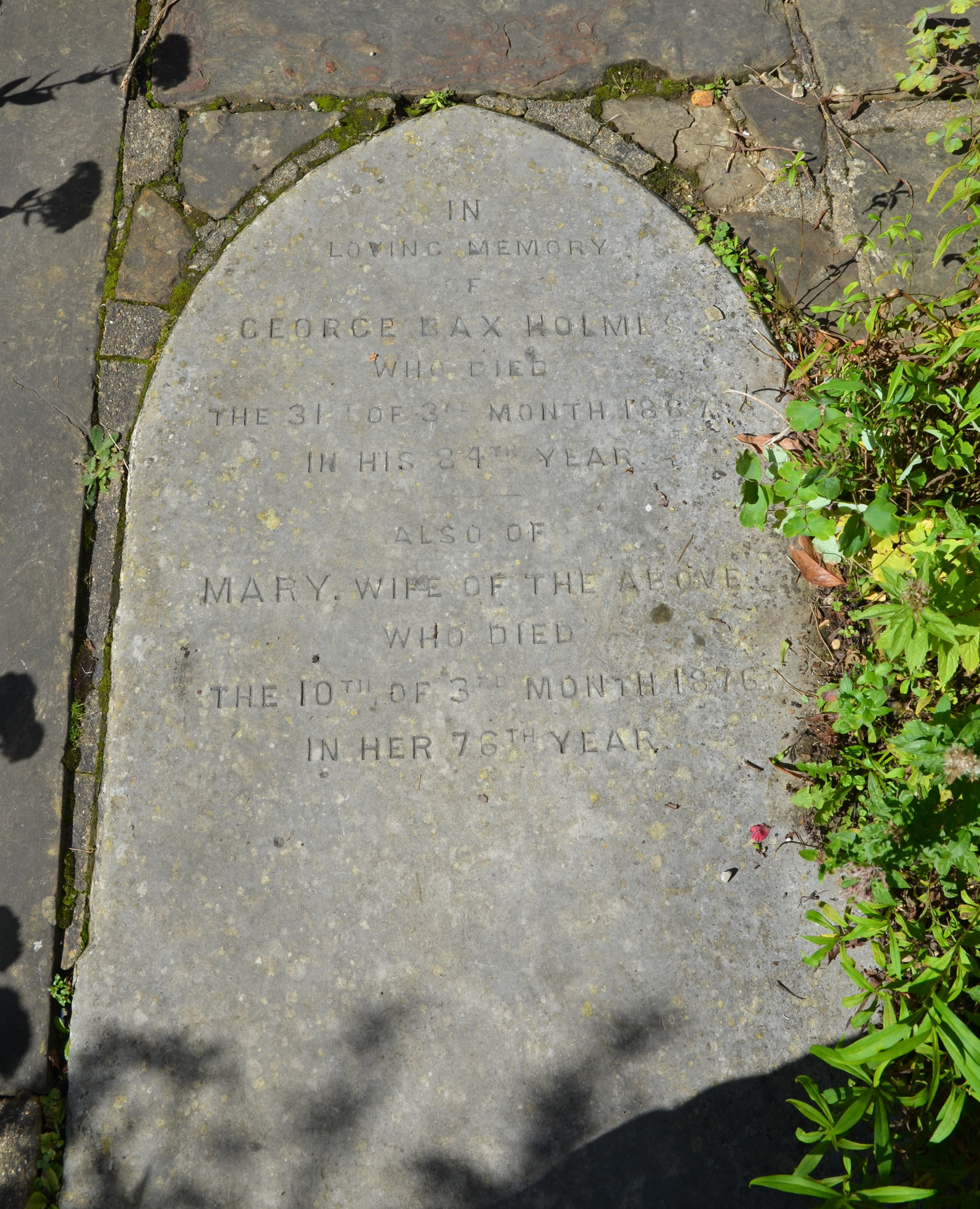
Holmes's gravestone

Bax Holmes is perhaps best known for his discovery of the Great Horsham Iguanodon, a plant eating dinosaur, in building works on the future site of the Royal & Sun Alliance (now RSA) headquarters. In 1840 a stone was uncovered while building the Chapel of Ease, later to become St Mark's Church. Bax Holmes identified them as fossilised iguanodon bones, the largest found since the name was coined by Gideon Mantell of Lewes some 15 years earlier. The bones were used by Benjamin Waterhouse Hawkins in 1854 when creating the dinosaur models for Sydenham Park.

A record of Bax Holmes' work is preserved in the form of 34 letters to fellow fossil expert Richard Owen, with whom Bax Holmes was in correspondence throughout his life. These letters are held in the Owen Correspondence collection at the Natural History Museum.

== Legacy ==
George Bax Holmes died on 31 March 1887 and is buried at the Horsham Friends Meeting House. Today his gravestone is in use as a paving slab and can be seen at the start of the path to the left of the central entrance. His death is noted in the Quaker's Annual Monitor and the Horsham Advertiser, dated 2 April 1887, published an obituary.

After Bax Holmes died his daughter sold his collection of 767 (some say 764) fossils to the Corporation of Brighton for £55 and they later went on display at the Booth Museum of Natural History. Until recently they lay in store there until being returned to Horsham Museum for a long term display. It is believed that Bax Holmes lived in the Causeway next door to the current museum and the bones have almost come home.

== See also ==
The Crystal Palace Dinosaur Court
