= Hannah Stewart =

Sculptor from Horsham, England

- Born: 1976 (age 49–50); Horsham
- Education: Collyer's; DeMontfort University; City and Guilds of London Art School
- Occupation: sculptor

Hannah Stewart is a sculptor from and based in Horsham, in West Sussex, England, who primarily creates life-sized bronze-cast sculptures.

She attended Collyer's from 1992 to 1994. After that she studied a foundation course in conservation and restoration at the Lincoln College of Art while it was the "School of Art and Design" for DeMontfort University, which was followed by a Graduate Diploma, Sculpture and Licentiateship at the City and Guilds of London Art School. After graduation she worked in a series of sculpture-related jobs such as mould-making, sculpting for film and television, and casting fireproof objects for contemporary fireplaces.

She makes her models with clay, and those are then cast into bronze using Lost-wax casting.

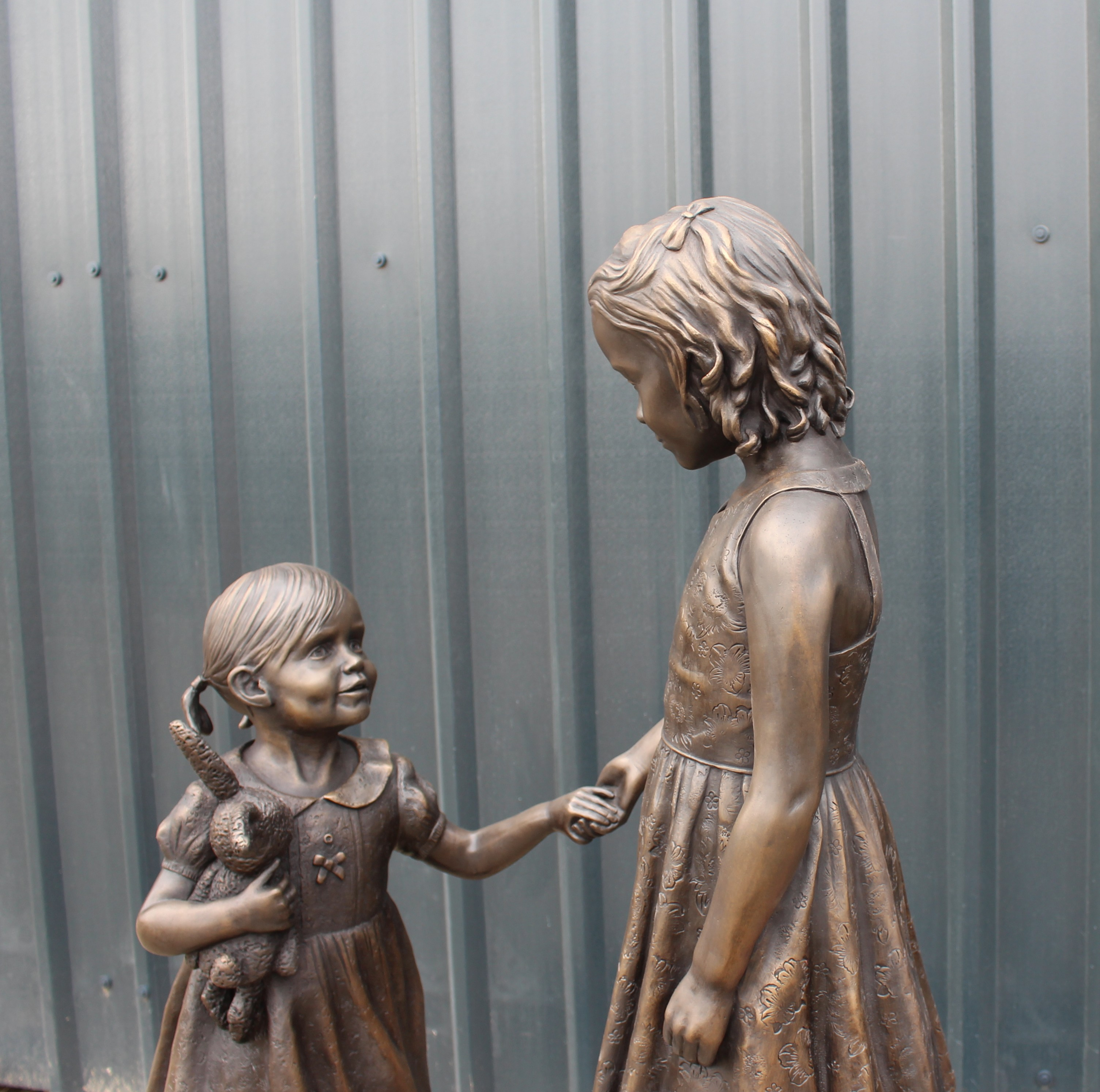
"Two Sisters" - Life size, bronze, private commission, of two sisters holding hands by Hannah Stewart

== Selected works ==
- St Leonard’s Forest Dragon in Horsham Park maze.
- Iguanadons - one in Lintot Square, Southwater and one in Leyton Lea, Cuckfield, West Sussex.
- Hauling Man on North Street in Hailsham, East Sussex.
- Captain Wilfred ‘Billie’ Nevill, Dover College.
- Lily Parr, National Football Museum in Manchester - The first prominent public sculpture of a female footballer in the UK.
- Danny Bergara, Stockport County F.C. grounds, Edgeley Park
- Ella Adoo-Kissi-Debrah in Mountsfield Park - In memory of the schoolgirl who was the first person to have air pollution recorded as a cause of death on her death certificate.
- Shelley Memorial at Collyer's - An illustration of the poet's sonnet Ozymandias to commemorate the 200th anniversary of his death.

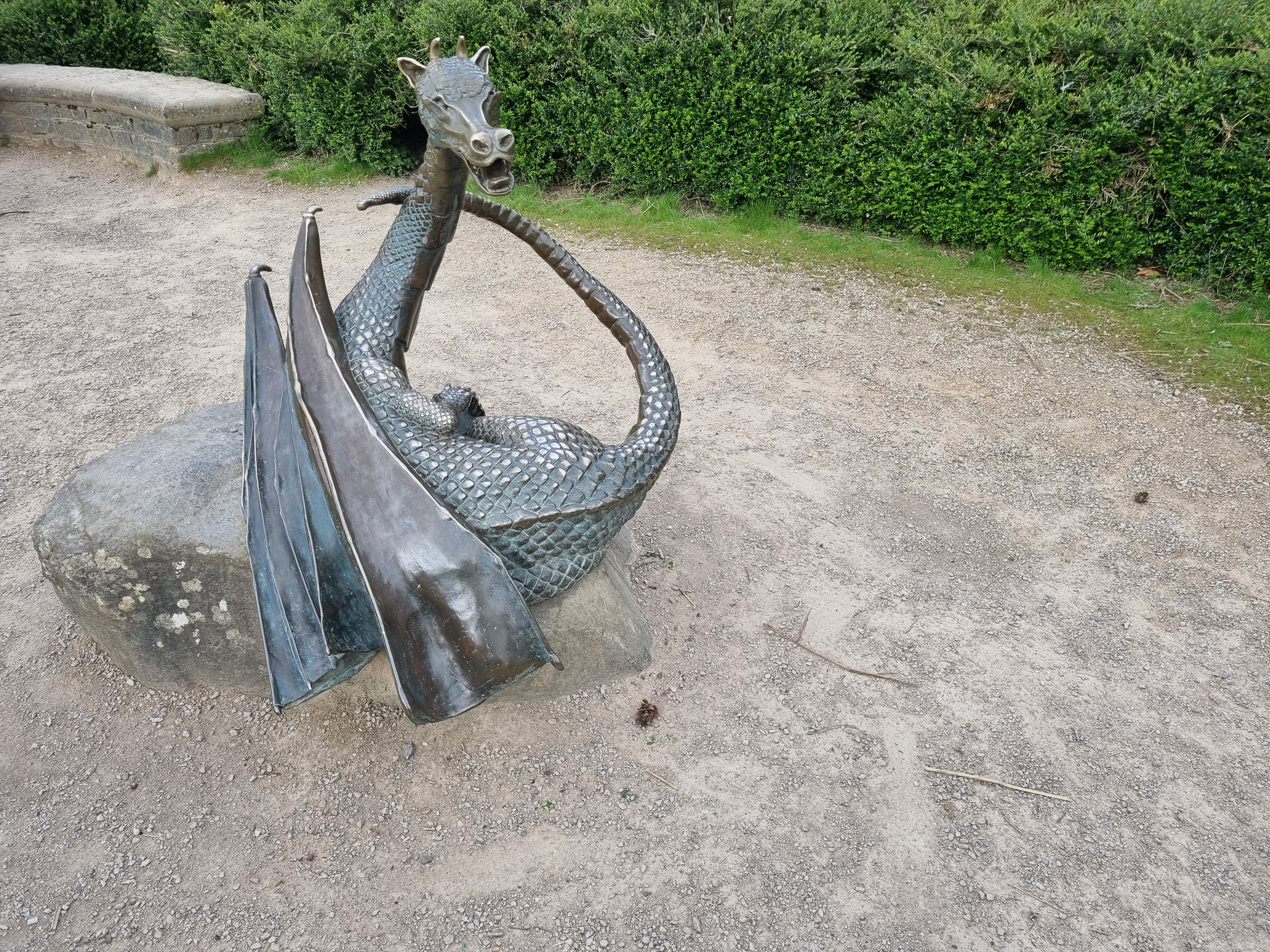
The St. Leonard's Forest Dragon in Horsham Park.
