= Roger Perry (photographer) =

British photographer

- Perry in 1976
- Born: 1944; Cambridge, England, United Kingdom
- Died: 1991 (aged 46–47); Cambridge, England, United Kingdom
- Education: Harrow Technical College and School of Art
- Known for: Photography

Roger Perry (1944–1991) was a British photographer, best known for his work at Time Out, as well as The Sunday Times and The Observer colour magazines. His 1976 book of London graffiti photography The Writing on The Wall was one of the first extensive surveys of the city's burgeoning 'scene'.

== Life and work ==
Perry studied at Harrow School of Art after deciding to become a professional photographer. Around this time he became friends with Tony Elliott who was studying at Keele University, editing a student magazine that Perry contributed to. When Elliott went on to found Time Out, he employed Perry as house photographer. Working alongside designer Pearce Marchbank, Perry created hundreds of iconic covers for the London listings magazine.

One cover that Perry photographed, working with Marchbank, came third in the Professional Publishers Association Cover of the Century award. It depicted Winston Churchill's trademark V sign, with Marchbank's studio cleaner acting as 'hand-double' for the shoot.

In the 1980s Perry began working as a photojournalist, particularly for the colour supplements of the Sunday newspapers such as The Sunday Times, where he regularly worked on the "Life in the Day" feature.

Due to severe rheumatoid arthritis, Perry retired to Suffolk where he began trading and restoring classic Lancia cars. He used a Lancia Stratos as an everyday runaround car.

He died in Cambridge in 1991, with large obituaries published in many of the publications he used to contribute to, with Ian Jack writing an extensive one for The Independent.

== Legacy ==
In 2014 Perry's graffiti book The Writing on The Wall was republished after a Kickstarter campaign was started by George Stewart-Lockhart. The new edition is expanded to include more photographs, with an extensive new foreword, as well as a short essay by Bill Drummond. The original introduction by George Melly was also included, as well as numerous recollections about Perry from friends and colleagues such as Tony Elliott, Neil Lyndon and Simon Park, amongst others. Writing in The Guardian on the subject of The Writing On The Wall, Alexis Petridis wrote that "Perry’s photos offer a vivid snapshot of British culture in the mid-70s, between the final curdling of the hippy counterculture and the arrival of punk".

== Publications ==
- The Writing on The Wall. London: Elm Tree, 1976. ISBN 024189252X. With an introduction by George Melly.
- The Writing on The Wall (Expanded Edition). London: Plain Crisp, 2015. ISBN 978-0993152009. With an introduction by Melly and a short essay by Bill Drummond.

== Exhibitions ==
- Photography in the Theatre, Impressions Gallery, York, 1973. With Angus McBean, Cecil Beaton and John Walmsley.
- Graffiti, The Roundhouse, London, 1978
- Punk: Photographs, Impressions Gallery, York, 1978
