= Devon Endersby =

South African-born English cricketer

Personal information
- Full name: Devon Malcolm Endersby
- Born: 12 May 1992 (age 34); East London, Cape Province, South Africa
- Batting: Right-handed
- Bowling: Right-arm medium-fast

Domestic team information
- Years: Team
- 2012–2014: Loughborough MCCU
- 2013: Unicorns

Career statistics
Competition	First-class	List A
Matches	6	6
Runs scored	107	50
Batting average	11.88	12.50
100s/50s	–/1	–/–
Top score	53	21
Balls bowled	414	156
Wickets	4	1
Bowling average	72.75	212.00
5 wickets in innings	–	–
10 wickets in match	–	–
Best bowling	1/38	1/53
Catches/stumpings	1/–	2/–
- Source: Cricinfo, 25 February 2019

Devon Malcolm Endersby (born 12 May 1992) is a South African-born English former first-class cricketer.

Endersby was born in East London, Eastern Cape, South Africa. Upon moving to England he was educated in Horsham at Tanbridge House School and The College of Richard Collyer. From there he went up to Loughborough University. While studying at Loughborough, Endersby played first-class cricket for Loughborough MCCU, making his debut against Nottinghamshire at Trent Bridge in 2012. He played first-class cricket for Loughborough MCCU in from 2012–2014, making a total of six appearances. He scored 107 runs across his six matches, at an average of 11.88, with a high score of 53. He struggled to take wickets with his right-arm medium-fast bowling, claiming 4 wickets from 69 overs bowled.

In 2013, Endersby was called up to the Unicorns squad for the 2013 Yorkshire Bank 40, making his List A one-day debut in the tournament against Gloucestershire at Bristol. He made five further List A appearances during the tournament. He again struggled to take wickets in the one-day game, claiming a single wicket from 26 overs bowled. His only wicket in one-day cricket was the Ireland international Paul Stirling, who was playing for Middlesex.

Endersby currently resides in Australia.
