= George Marshall (philanthropist) =

English cleric and philanthropist

Reverend George Marshall (1753 in Bishop´s Waltham, Hants – 1819) served as a curate in Horsham for over thirty years, from about 1778 until his death in 1819, although he was not fully ordained as a minister until 1802. Marshall also acted as chaplain to the prisoners in Horsham gaol. It is clear from some of his letters in the Horsham Museum archives that George Marshall was a somewhat awkward and abrasive character.

== Work ==
Marshall did much to improve educational facilities for poor children in Horsham in his latter years, for example in 1812 he established a national school in St. Mary's church porch, then part of Trinity chantry, at which education was free of charge and available to both girls and boys. Soon about 100 children were enrolled and it was necessary to provide more spacious accommodation. Thanks to George Marshall, Horsham was in the vanguard of this new movement by the National Society for the Education of the Poor (an offshoot of the Society for the Promotion of Christian Knowledge), to bring primary school education within the reach of every child. On the landing in Horsham Museum is the oil on canvas portrait of Reverend George Marshall by unknown artist c.1820.
