= Teresa Copnall =

British artist (1882-1972)

- Born: Teresa Norah Burchart; 24 August 1882; Haughton-le-Skerne, England
- Died: 1972 (aged 89–90)
- Education: Slade School of Fine Art; von Herkomer’s Academy
- Known for: Painting

Teresa Norah Copnall (née Burchart; 24 August 1882 – 1972), was a British painter known for her flower studies and portrait painting.

== Biography ==
Copnall was born in Haughton-le-Skerne near Darlington in the north of England, where her father was a company director. She was educated in Brussels before attending art school in Barrow in Furness. Copnall studied at the Slade School of Art in London and also at Hubert von Herkomer’s art school in Bushey.

She married the Liverpool born portrait painter Frank Thomas Copnall (1870-1948) and the couple settled at Hoylake in Cheshire. They also became regular visitors to the artists colony at St Ives in Cornwall.

During her career Copnall exhibited at the Royal Academy in London on several occasions. She also exhibited with the Royal Institute of Oil Painters, the Royal Scottish Academy and the Society of Women Artists. Copnall was a member of the Deeside Art Group and the Royal Glasgow Institute of the Fine Arts. Overseas her work was shown at the Paris Salon and also exhibited in Canada. Both the Medici Society and Raphael Tuck & Sons produced reproductions of her designs and the Walker Art Gallery in Liverpool holds examples of her flower paintings.

== See also ==
- Edward Bainbridge Copnall
- John Copnall
