= Simon Henley =

Rear Admiral Simon Henley MBE FRAeS (born 1 March 1957) is a former Royal Navy officer, and a former President of the Royal Aeronautical Society.

== Early life ==
He attended Collyer’s Grammar School (since 1976 The College of Richard Collyer from 1969–75, a sixth form college) in West Sussex, studying maths, physics and chemistry. He gained a BSc degree in mechanical engineering at the Royal Naval Engineering College (RNEC) in Plymouth in 1979.

== Career ==
=== Royal Navy ===
Henley worked for 32 years in the Royal Navy as an engineering officer until 2007. He was Project Director for four years of the UK part of the Joint Strike Fighter program. His final role was as Technical Director for both the Defence Procurement Agency and the Defence Logistics Organisation in the rank of Rear Admiral.

=== Rolls-Royce ===
Henley joined Rolls-Royce in July 2008. He became chief executive of Europrop International in December 2010, which builds the Europrop TP400 for the Airbus A400M Atlas.

=== Reaction Engines ===
Henley was appointed as a Senior Adviser to Reaction Engines between 2018 and 2024, supporting their work in hypersonic propulsion and the application of highly power-dense heat exchangers in aerospace applications. Currently he is an adviser to Greenjets and Quick Release Ltd, and a trustee of Navy Wings.

Henley served as President of the Royal Aeronautical Society from 2018 to 2019.

Professional and academic associations
Preceded by Air Chief Marshal Stephen Dalton	President of the Royal Aeronautical Society; 2018-2019	Succeeded by Professor Jonathan Cooper
