= Gillingham School =

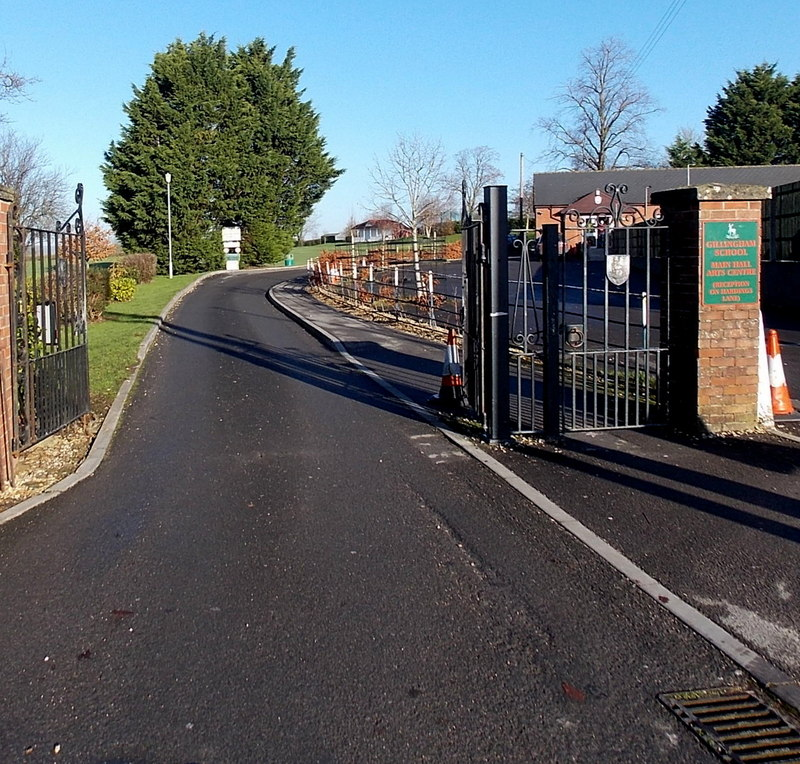

Location
- Hardings Lane; Gillingham, Dorset, SP8 4QP; England; 51°02′17″N 2°16′05″W

Information
- Type: Academy
- Motto: Docendo discimus (By teaching, we learn)
- Established: 1516; 510 years ago
- Local authority: Dorset County Council
- Department for Education URN: 113882 Tables
- Ofsted: Reports
- Head teacher: Paul Nicholson
- Gender: Mixed
- Age: 11 to 18
- Enrollment: 1,769
- Houses: Baxter, Clarendon, Davenant, Fletcher, George Butler, Hurley, Lyndon, Matthews, Seager, Wagner
- Website: www.gillingham-dorset.co.uk

Gillingham School is a coeducational school situated in Gillingham in North Dorset, England. Gillingham Grammar School can trace its foundation back to 1516. It was founded as a Free School, paid for out of the proceeds of land gifted to the school by several local landowners, and was managed by twelve trustees or Feoffees. Evidence exists to prove that the Gillingham Free School persisted without a break until the present day although the format has metamorphosed to a Grammar school and then to its present Comprehensive status. Among its distinguished alumni was Edward Hyde, who became the 1st Earl of Clarendon, and Lord High Chancellor of England 1661–1667. Edward Frampton was the headmaster in 1648 and he became Bishop of Gloucester in 1680.

Over the years the school further prospered, and in 1916 girls were admitted for the first time. It was in 1926 that the school came under the control of the Dorset County Council who agreed to pay the staff salaries and provide grants for most education needs. In 1940 a County "Modern School" for the less academically able was built in a field next to the Grammar School and in 1959 the two schools combined into a Comprehensive School. Over the years and particularly in recent times the buildings were modernised and eventually all were replaced. The present school now has a roll of over 1600 pupils and a high reputation for achievement.

Gillingham School is divided up into 10 form tutors, each with a name which relates to the school in one way or another. They are; Baxter, Clarendon, Davenant, Fletcher, George-Butler, Hurley, Matthews, Lyndon, Seager, and Wagner. As a comprehensive school, Year 7 - 11 have these tutors, each with roughly 32 pupils in. The Gillingham School Sixth Form are sorted into tutors, however the names are different from the school. The names are the initials of the form tutor teacher themselves.

The Gillingham School sixth form attracts students from a large surrounding region and the school was rated 'good' in the latest Ofsted report.

== Notable alumni ==
- Yvonne Fletcher – Metropolitan Police officer murdered in a 1984 diplomatic incident
- Neil Lyndon – writer and journalist.
- Adam Tomkins – Conservative Member of the Scottish Parliament
- Josh Sims – football player, currently playing for Yeovil Town F.C.
- Lloyd Isgrove – football player, currently playing for Hume City FC
- Jonathan Brearley - CEO of GB energy regulator Ofgem

== Racism controversy ==
In 2022, it was claimed that the school had neglected over 30 reports of racism from a family that included a teacher and three students. The family later contacted North Dorset MP Simon Hoare. According to their complaint, the school told them that it adopted a "zero tolerance" approach to bullying, then failed to provide a copy of their policy when asked. The school claims to have worked closely with local and national authorities and told reporters they could not discuss the outcome of their investigation.

== See also ==
- List of English and Welsh endowed schools (19th century)
