= The Forest School, Horsham =

The Forest School

Location
- Comptons Lane; South East; Horsham, West Sussex, RH13 5NW; England; 51°03′34″N 0°18′24″W

Information
- Former names: Horsham secondary modern for boys
- Type: Community school
- Motto: Learners today; Leaders tomorrow
- Established: c. 1969
- Local authority: West Sussex
- Specialist: Engineering College, Business and Enterprise College
- Department for Education URN: 126065 Tables
- Ofsted: Reports
- Chair of Governors: C. Purvis
- Headteacher: I. Straw
- Staff: 120
- Years offered: Year 7 to 11
- Gender: All
- Age: 11 to 16
- Enrolment: 1048
- Hours in school day: 6.30 hrs
- Campus size: 20 Acres
- Houses: Osprey, Eagle, Kestrel, Falcon
- Colours: Red; Yellow; Green; Blue
- Communities served: Horsham District
- Website: www.theforestschool.com

The Forest School is a comprehensive secondary school in Horsham, West Sussex, England. It educates students between the ages of 11 and 16 and is a specialist Engineering and Business and Enterprise College. The school liaises closely with Millais School, the girls' school in the town. It was formerly an 11–18 secondary modern school, becoming an 11–16 comprehensive in 1976. From September 2021, the school is co-educational.

== History ==
The school's history can be traced back to 1928, when the Oxford Road Senior School opened. This was a co-educational school that in 1932 had an average attendance of 208: 116 boys and 92 girls; by 1938, this number had risen to 294: 153 boys and 141 girls. After 1944, the school split into Horsham secondary boys' and girls' schools.. The boys' school—then named Horsham Secondary Modern School for Boys—moved to its current campus in Comptons Lane in 1954. In 1958, the girls' school was relocated to a nearby site, and both schools were renamed under the Forest name, leading to the opening of the Forest secondary boys school.

In 1976, education in the town was reorganized to form three comprehensive schools and a separate sixth form college in place of the existing grammar and secondary modern structure. The Forest school was reconstituted as an 11–16 boys comprehensive, with sixth form provision moving to The College of Richard Collyer.

For a period of time which included 1979–1985, the school was divided into departments or "Houses", each its own colour.

Brunel – Art/Design/Metalwork/Woodwork (Pink), Faraday – Sciences (Yellow), Mansion – Languages (Light Blue), Newton – Mathematics (Red), Shelley – English language/Literature (Dark Blue), Tyler – Humanities (Green)

In the late '70s and early '80s, the first computers arrived and these were Commodore PETs (2 with 1Kb memory and 1 with 32Kb memory). These were under the care of the Mathematics department and were later joined by a batch of 16Kb PETs and a BBC Micro. The Science Department procured a Sinclair ZX80, then a ZX81 as their first computers.

In 2008, the past Houses (Tudor, Stuart, Lancaster, and York) were disbanded, and new "communities" were formed (Dyson, Hawking, Branson and Marconi respectively). The school introduced a 'Vertical Tutor Group' system in 2009, but ceased this in 2020.

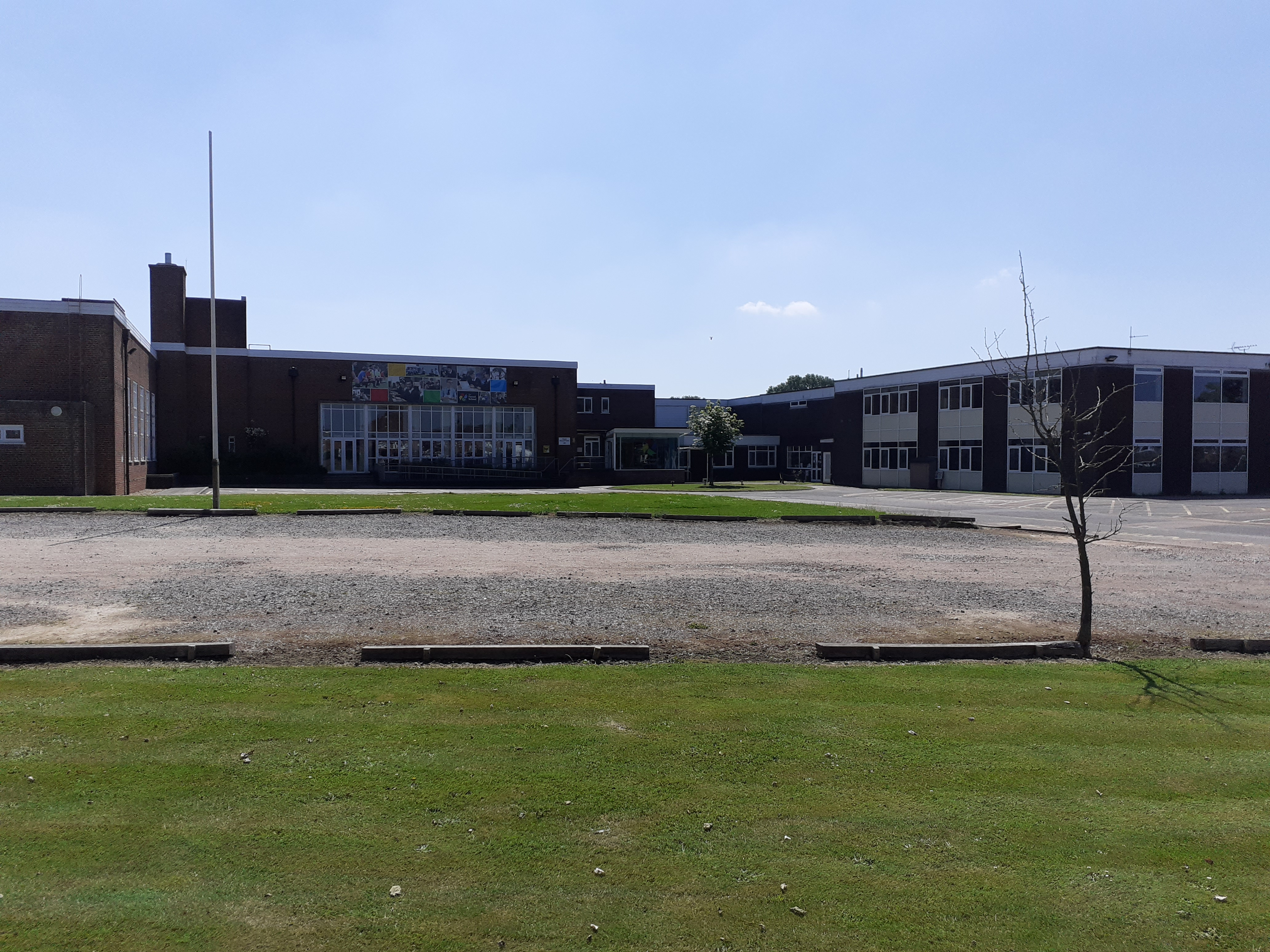
Entrance

In April 2010 the redesigned school website was launched complete with virtual learning facilities, which are now used mostly for homework and revision material. This website has been taken out of service and now the school has an updated website. The website was created by Cleverbox, who also designed other materials for the school, including prospectus designs and van artwork.

In July 2018, the school's headteacher, Siobhan Denning, left after 11 years at Forest School, which saw the school go from almost a 'special measures' Ofsted rating to a 'good' rating.[5]

As of July 2020, West Sussex County Council announced proposals to alter The Forest School from a single sex boys' school to a co-educational school from September 2021 entry. and is also used by local groups after school time.

In September 2021, the school became co-educational with the new year 7 intake, which included 30 girls.

== Campus ==
The school is located on a 20-acre site which includes; The Queen Elizabeth II Silver Jubilee school was built in 1977 on the northern part of the Forest school site; facilities are: science labs (eight), mathematics rooms (seven), English rooms (seven), humanities rooms (eight), DT rooms (eight), media studies rooms (one), music rooms (two), drama studios (one), computer rooms (ten), inclusion rooms (three), PE changing rooms (eight), library, main hall, gymnasium, sports hall and multi-use sports area. The Phoenix Stroke Club is situated in the north west area of the school in an old clubhouse. The building cost £1.5 million, and was opened in October 2006. A new Science classroom and a new Food Technology classroom was opened in September 2018.

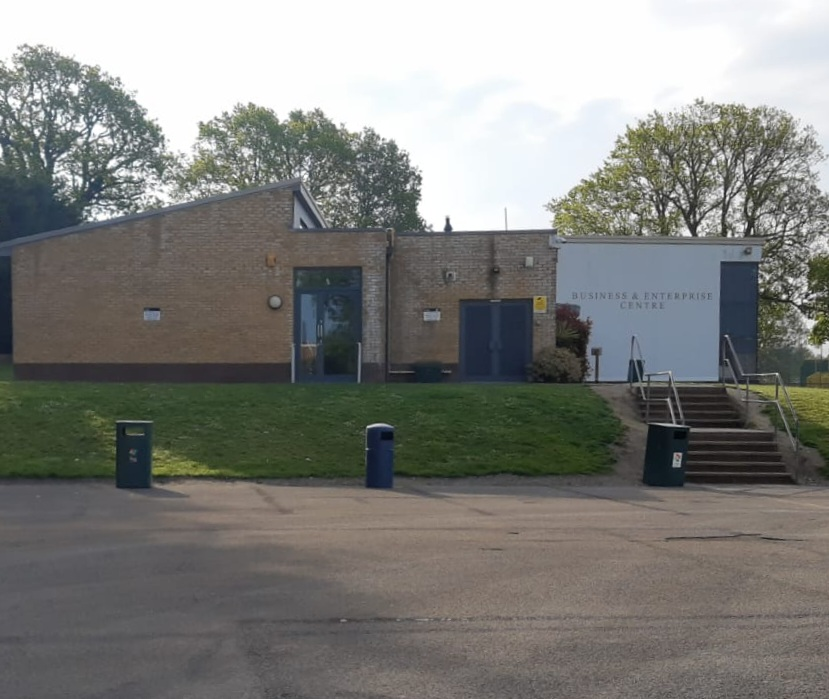
The BEC

== Headteachers ==
- Mr. I. Straw Sept. 2018–Present
- Ms. S. Denning Apr. 2007 -Jul.2018
- Mrs. J. Godly Sept. 2006 -Apr. 2007 (Acting Head)
- Mr. J. Fadden Sept. 1989 -Jul.2006
- Mr. F. Newby OBE Sept. 1967 -Jul.1989
- Mr. C. Hawkins Sept. 1954-Jul.1967

== Results ==
	2012	2013	2014	2015	2016	2017
10 or more A*/A	29	20	17	20	6.9	0.69
5 A*-C (inc English & Maths)	62%	69%	67%	61%	48%	25%
5 A*-C	84%	85%	83%	69%	57%	48%
A*-G	98%	96%	99%	95%	97%	69%

In 2019, the school's Progress 8 benchmark at GCSE was below the national average. The Attainment 8 score was just below the national average. The proportion of children achieving grade 5 or above in English and maths GCSEs was 36%, compared to 43% nationally. Absence was higher than the national average.

== Events ==
- The school hosts events organized by staff and pupils. This includes football matches between the students and the teachers.
- There is an annual Performance Evening, which is drama, dance, PE, music, and art.
- In 2009, an annual event was introduced called 'The FM Factor', a talent show featuring pupils from both Forest and Millais school (hosted at Forest).
- In 2009, three pupils organized and choreographed a 'Teachers got Talent' show featuring musical performances from the staff - and featuring successful acts from the 2009 FM Factor. The event raised £500 which went towards a local school for children with disabilities.
- In 2010 the school collaborated with Millais School to produce a production of 'Billy Elliot: The Musical'. It was performed at The Capitol Theatre in Horsham.
- In 2011 the school put on a production of "Joseph and the Amazing Technicolour Dreamcoat".
- The school enters the UK Rock Challenge. Its awards from this include 'Performers Choice' and 'Drugs Awareness Award' in 2009, 'Best Staging' in 2010, and 'Best Backstage Crew' in both 2009 and 2010.
- In 2012 the school put on a production of We Will Rock You (musical) with four performances over three days.

== Charity ==
- The school raises money for charity with events such as non-uniform days, cake sales, and teacher vs. pupil events. Pupils brought in items from their homes to send to Haiti after the devastating earthquakes.
- In November 2013, the school raised £1500 for the 2013 Philippines Disaster
- In May 2021 the school raised £935 for the NSPCC with a non-uniform day.
