= Neil Lyndon =

British journalist and writer (born 1946)

- Born: Neil Alexander Barnacle; 12 September 1946 (age 79)
- Education: Queens' College, Cambridge
- Occupations: Writer; journalist
- Years active: 1968–present
- Known for: Critique of feminism
- Notable work: No More Sex War: The Failures of Feminism
- Spouse(s): Monica Foot m.1971 div.1976 Deirdre m.1977 div.1992 Linda Lyndon
- Children: 2 daughters, 1 son, 1 step-son

Neil Alexander Lyndon (born Neil Alexander Barnacle; 12 September 1946) is a British journalist and writer. He has written for The Sunday Times, The Times, The Independent, the Evening Standard the Daily Mail and the Telegraph.

Lyndon is known for his book No More Sex War: The Failures of Feminism (Sinclair-Stevenson 1992), which he claims was "the world's first egalitarian, progressive, non-sexist critique of feminism in its own terms".

== Early life ==
Born in 1946, Lyndon grew up in the Sussex Weald, a rural area and between 1958 and 1962 he attended Collyer's school, Horsham In 1962 his father was bankrupted and sentenced to three years imprisonment for fraud and embezzlement, leaving the family short of money. Lyndon's mother then changed the family name to her maiden name and he moved to Gillingham School where he faced having to leave to get a job following completion of his O-levels due to the family's financial situation. Instead, his tutor Frank Hodgson paid the family money so Lyndon could complete his A-levels. Lyndon became head-boy and later set up the Frank Hodgson Trust for the school, providing similar financial support for sixth-form students. One of the ten houses at the school is also named after Lyndon. As a teenager he was interested in progressive causes, he joined the Young Communist League as well as the Campaign for Nuclear Disarmament.

According to a newspaper article written by Lyndon, he became, in 1965, the first student from a comprehensive school to be awarded an unconditional place at Cambridge University where he attended Queens' College. At university he took a job in a scrap yard and later in light engineering. He rapidly became involved with radical left-wing politics at Cambridge. He took part in many demonstrations and sit-ins and after his graduation he was a co-founder of The Shilling Paper, a radical weekly. In 1969, he joined the editorial board of the underground paper The Black Dwarf. Years later, in 2007 he wrote in The Sunday Times of his shame at how he had "once toasted mass murderers, torturers and totalitarian despots", particularly as he had distant relatives in Czechoslovakia.

== Career ==
In the 1970s Lyndon worked in various divisions of the BBC, including for The Listener

Lyndon was a journalist in the 1980s, writing for the "Atticus" column in The Sunday Times, as well as for The Times, The Independent, the Evening Standard and others. He wrote columns, profiles and feature articles covering a wide variety of issues such as politics, sport, music and books Lyndon also make television appearances, including as a guest on a famous episode of Channel Four show After Dark.

== On gender issues ==
Lyndon first focused on gender issues in a 1990 essay for The Sunday Times Magazine entitled "Badmouthing". The 5,000-word piece argued that, in advertising, entertainment, the news media, family law, education and health research, "an atmosphere of intolerance surrounded men", blaming this intolerance on "the universal dominance of feminism". Lyndon concluded the piece stating:

"If relations between men, women and children are to improve, attitudes to men and manhood must change. It wouldn’t be a bad start if men caused to be the butt of casual prejudice expressed in half-witted habits of speech. But the most important job our legislators face must be to remove some of the systemic disadvantages of life for men to improve their position within the family and within society at large. There is one sense in which men, as a group and a whole, can be described as a class in Britain: in a host of vital ways they second class citizens."

It later emerged that female writers at The Times had allegedly made an unsuccessful attempt to have Lyndon's article censored, so the women instead wrote a derogatory article about Lyndon in the Sunday Times Magazine's "Style" section.

=== No More Sex War ===
The following year he wrote his book, No More Sex War: The Failures of Feminism, published in 1992, in which he expanded on these arguments.

==== Reception ====
The work received a large amount of attention in the media, some of it hostile and abusive, vilifying Lyndon.

Rather than addressing the issues and arguments raised by Lyndon, many critics instead chose to make verbal personal attacks. They suggested he was sexually inadequate, questioned the size of his penis, his masculinity, his ability to attract women and even the smell of his breath. Almost two decades later feminist writer Julie Burchill continued the verbal personal attack, suggesting he was a "sad-sack" and "the opposite of a man". According to Lyndon, in one review of books of the year, Helena Kennedy refused to even discuss the publication, simply instructing people not to buy it.

==== Impact ====
The book sold few copies and Lyndon's work in journalism dried up. In August 1992 he was declared bankrupt. Before the publication of No More Sex War, Lyndon's marriage had broken up and his wife had taken their child to Scotland where, according to Lyndon, she obtained an order of custody without Lyndon knowing the case was being heard. Also according to Lyndon, in the subsequent divorce, his media notoriety was used against him in court, and he lost all access to his son. He rebuilt his career in journalism during the 1990s, and was later reunited with his son, who lived with him in Scotland before going to university. Lyndon also claimed he was assaulted at Heathrow Airport because of his book. He claimed in 2000 that at Cambridge University, his alma mater, a president of Cambridge Union encouraged members to burn his writings, and that a university don told her students that she would like to see him shot.

Eight years after the controversy, Lyndon revisited some of the issues in his book and discussed his story. He highlighted the issues in relation to "the treatment of dissidents in what is supposed to be an open society". Whilst not comparing his plight to the coetaneous case of Salman Rushdie, he suggested it was "paradoxical that many of the people who defended Rushdie's right to write whatever he wanted should be so censorious and destructive about wanting to limit my freedom to do the same".

== Personal life ==
Lyndon married his first wife Monica Foot in 1971 and they divorced five years later. He married his second wife Deirdre in 1977 with whom he had a son and gained a step-son.

His third wife is Linda. They have two daughters.

== Publications ==
- No More Sex War: The failures of feminism, by Neil Lyndon, 1992, Sinclair-Stevenson Ltd ISBN 978-1-85619-191-3
- A Boyhood in the Weald, by Neil Lyndon, 1998, Pomegranate Press ISBN 978-0-9519876-8-1
- Sexual Impolitics: Heresies on sex, gender and feminism, 2014
- Men of Respect(formerly Hail to the Chief), a musical about America between the inaugurations of John F. Kennedy and Richard Nixon, co-written by Lyndon.

== See also ==
- Warren Farrell
