= John Copnall =

English artist

John Bainbridge Copnall
- Born: 16 February 1928; Slinfold nr Horsham, England
- Died: 9 June 2007 (aged 79); London, England
- Other name: Juan de Retamá
- Education: Sir John Cass College; Royal Academy School
- Known for: Landscape & abstract painting
- Spouse(s): Madeleine Chardon; Caroline Brown
- Children: 3

John Bainbridge Copnall (1928–2007) was an English artist best known for his abstract expressionist painting of richly coloured stylised realism, often on a grand scale. He was also a teacher of painting for twenty years at the Central School of Art and Design in London.

== Early life ==
Copnall was born in Slinfold, a village near Horsham in West Sussex. His father was the eminent sculptor Edward Bainbridge Copnall (1903–1970) whilst his mother Muriel was an enthusiastic amateur artist. His uncle and aunt, Frank and Teresa Copnall, were both professional artists. as was another uncle, Hubert Picton Copnall (1918–1997), who also farmed in Sussex for over thirty years. His paternal grandfather, Edward White Copnall, was an early photographer and artist.

Copnall showed early promise in drawing and at the age of eighteen he began studying at the Architectural Association in London. This proved a poor choice of a career as Copnall lacked the required mathematical ability and used the excuse of his National Service to leave architecture permanently in order to become a professional artist.

== Career in Spain ==
Initially, Copnall started his painting studies under the tutelage of his father at the Sir John Cass School of Art in the City of London and from June 1950 to June 1955 under the artist Sir Henry Rushbury at the Royal Academy School. His early work was largely figurative and he won Turner Gold Medal for Landscape Painting in his penultimate year in 1954.

In 1954, Copnall and his artist friend Bert Flugelman visited Spain for what was intended to be a short visit but he fell in love with the Iberian landscape and stayed for fourteen years. Whilst on Ibiza he married his first wife Madeleine Chardon with whom he had a daughter and when the marriage ended he moved to the mainland to live in a hacienda in the mountains above Malaga where he earned a living as a painter sometimes using the name of Juan de Retamá. The intense light of Spain and the visceral nature of its people changed his art fundamentally as he experimented with intense earthy colours whilst increasingly moving towards abstraction. Throughout his career Copnall was interested in using intense colour and the Spanish light undoubtedly enhanced his artistic senses.

As the 1960s progressed, Copnall became fashionable and he began to sell his paintings to private collectors, including American actor Melvyn Douglas. He had several solo exhibitions in Spain and Catalonia as well as shows in Germany where he was also popular and a lesser one in England in Newcastle. He said of his life in the 1960s: "No Beatles, but plenty of bullfighting, flamenco and Rioja!"

== Return to England ==
In 1968, Copnall returned to England and the following year held a solo exhibition at the Bear Lane Gallery in Oxford. His work of this period displayed the influence of American abstract expressionists such as Barnett Newman, Morris Louis and Mark Rothko with Copnall using acrylic paint on cotton duck using increasingly larger canvasses. His use of colour was exuberant. Copnall stated that 'Painting is colour and colour is painting." In 1970, he won the E. A. Abbey Scholarship and further recognition followed with Arts Council awards in 1973 and a British Council Award in 1979. Copnall had a series of solo exhibitions held throughout the 1970s but thereafter became an increasingly peripheral figure in the context of mainstream English art, as abstract art began to lose influence with new 'pop' styles in vogue. Nevertheless, he was an influential figure for the next generation of British artists by virtue of a twenty-year period from 1973 to 1993 when Copnall worked as a teacher at the Canterbury School of Art and the Central School of Art and Design.

== Later years in London ==
Copnall married, secondly, in 1976 to Caroline Brown with whom he had a son and a daughter. By 1982, he was working in an artists' colony in the East End of London at the defunct Spratt's dog biscuit warehouse in Bow whilst continuing with his teaching role. In 1996, his solo show Reflections, Orbits and Radiances in the De La Warr Pavilion in Bexhill-on-Sea, Sussex drew mainly on work done in the period 1992-96. In the catalogue, Christopher Lloyd, Surveyor of the Queen's Pictures, considered that it was "difficult to think of a more appropriate setting for John Copnall's paintings" than this light-filled example of pioneering mid-1930s architecture.

Copnall was elected to the London Group in 1988. During the final years of his life, divorced from his second wife Copnall painted infrequently and ceased all together following a stroke. He died on 9 June 2007 following a short illness.

== Selected public collections ==
- Aberdeen Art Gallery & Museum
- Addenbrooke's Hospital, Cambridge
- Arts Council England
- Ateneum Museum, Helsinki
- Chelsea & Westminster Hospital
- St. Mary's College, Twickenham, London

== Selected Solo Exhibitions ==
- 1955 Piccadilly Gallery, London
- 1956 Sala Vayreda, Barcelona
- 1956 Piccadiilly Gallery, London
- 1957 Galerie Wolfgang Gurlitt, Munich
- 1957 Univera Haus, Nuremberg
- 1958 Institut fur Ausianbezeinhungen, Stuttgart
- 1958 Piccadiliy Gallery, London
- 1960 Stone Gallery, Newcastle
- 1961 Piccadilly Gallery, London
- 1969 Bear Lane Gallery, Oxford
- 1972 Institute of Contemporay Arts, London
- 1973 Ikon Gallery, Birmingham
- 1973 Richard Demarco Gallery, Edinburgh
- 1974 Prudhoe Gallery, London
- 1974 Aberdeen Art Gallery, Aberdeen
- 1979 Galerie Morner, Stockhom
- 1983 Oxford Gallery, Oxford
- 1996 Reeds Wharf, London
- 1996 De La Warr Pavilion, Bexhill, East Sussex
- 2008 Mark Barrow Fine Art, London
