= Tanbridge House School =

Coeducational secondary school in West Sussex, England

Location
- Farthings Hill; Horsham, West Sussex, RH12 1SR; England; 51°03′53″N 0°21′04″W

Information
- Type: Community school
- Motto: Exceptional everyday
- Established: 1976 (current site built in 1994)
- Local authority: West Sussex
- Department for Education URN: 126064 Tables
- Ofsted: Reports
- Headteacher: Mark Sheridan
- Gender: Coeducational
- Age: 11 to 16
- Enrolment: 1268+
- Houses: Redgrave, Radcliffe, Wilkinson
- Colour
- Website: www.tanbridge-house-sch.co.uk

Tanbridge House School, formerly Horsham High School for Girls, is a coeducational secondary school in Horsham, West Sussex, England.

== School history ==
Date	Notes
1627	The original Tanbridge House built by Richard Nye.
1887	Tanbridge House rebuilt by Thomas Oliver in neo-Jacobean style. It is one of the first houses with electricity in Horsham. The building on Worthing Road is still extant today.
1904	The pupil-teacher centre which later became Horsham High School for Girls opened, originally in the Wesleyan Hall in London Road.
1920	Thomas Oliver dies; Tanbridge House is sold to West Sussex County Council for £7,000.
1924	The building becomes the Horsham High School for Girls.
1968	Tanbridge House described as "a fine example of the revived Wealden tradition".
1976	Horsham High School for Girls is merged with nearby Manor House School and becomes Tanbridge House School, a mixed comprehensive.
1988	Tanbridge House faces demolition but a teacher at the school launches a successful campaign to save the building.
1993	Foundation Stone for new school buildings off Guilford Road, adjacent to the A24 road (England) is laid by Sir Philip Ward. The new school had been planned by Chairman of Governors David Radbourne and Headmaster Neil Chapman.
1994	The new school site is opened. The former school buildings on the Manor House site are demolished (to be replaced by Sainsbury's supermarket), and Tanbridge House is sold for conversion to apartments.
2009	The school obtains the all-weather pitch from Broadbridge Heath Leisure Centre.
2012	Housing developments begin around the school. It is agreed that Tanbridge House School will be given more sports pitches once the developments are completed.
2016	Extensions to current school site completed.

== Inspection judgements ==
In November 2012, and again in June 2024, the school achieved and maintained an 'Outstanding' Ofsted rating in all four key areas of inspection.

== Drama ==
The school theatre production is held every summer at the Capitol Theatre in Horsham, and has included West Side Story (2008) Sweeney Todd (2009) Les Misérables (2010), Evita (2011), The Phantom of the Opera (2012), Miss Saigon (2013), Jekyll and Hyde (2017), Made in Dagenham (2018), High School Musical (2022) and Sister Act (2023).

In 1971, pupils at the school, then Horsham High School for Girls, put on the play Antigone by Jean Anouilh jointly with Christ's Hospital school.

== Notable former pupils ==
=== Horsham High School for Girls ===
- Kirsten Cooke, actor
- Maggie Gee, novelist
- Barbara Yorke, historian

=== Tanbridge House School ===
- Devon Endersby (born 1992), first-class cricketer
- Jamie Hewlett - artist/cartoonist and developer of the comic strip Tank Girl, and co-creator of the band Gorillaz
