= Howard Dudley =

British wood engraver and historian

Howard Dudley (1820–1864) was an English author and wood-engraver.

== Life ==
Born in 1820, Dudley was the only son of Quaker parents George and Sarah Dudley. He spent his early years in Fleet Street, London but on the death of his father in 1827 the family moved to Easebourne, West Sussex, near to Midhurst. Dudley married Jane Ellen Young on 1 December 1849 in Edinburgh, and returned to London three years later.

Howard Dudley died childless of consumption on 4 July 1864.

== Works ==
Dudley wrote the first illustrated history of Horsham, West Sussex, The History and Antiquities of Horsham and its Vicinities (1836). He also produced the lithographs and woodcuts that were used as the illustrations, and then went on to print the book himself. He was only 15 at the time. This was Dudley’s second book; the first being a wider ranging history of Sussex entitled Juvenile Researches of which he produced two editions in 1835 and 1836. The two texts are rare today. Facsimile copies have been reproduced on two occasions and now the full text and images of the Horsham book are available digitally. The first facsimile was published by Cecil Cramp in 1973, and its successor in 2002 was published by Dick Richardson. The Horsham book is dedicated to the Right Hon George O’Brien Wyndam, Earl of Egremont and Baron Cockermouth.

As a wood-engraver Dudley was self-taught, but went on to have a career in the art, producing work for various publishers and periodicals until shortly before his death.

== Reputation ==
Dick Richardson’s book, upon which the above text draws, quotes Dudley’s obituary in the Gentlemen’s Magazine: "Dudley was a mild and amiable man, affectionate in his domestic relations, and his gentlemanly manners, bright ideas and pungent remarks, and a very great choice of words, made him a delightful companion. He died with an earnest profession of his belief in Jesus Christ."
