= Millais School =

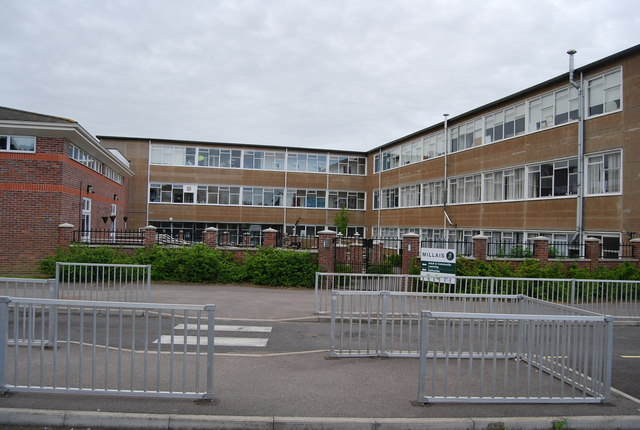

Location
- Depot Road; Horsham, West Sussex, RH13 5HR; England; 51°03′50″N 0°18′26″W

Information
- Type: Community school
- Local authority: West Sussex
- Department for Education URN: 126066 Tables
- Ofsted: Reports
- Headteacher: Alison Lodwick
- Gender: Girls / Moving to Co-Ed
- Age: 11 to 16
- Enrolment: 1,550
- Colours: Green, black and white
- Website: http://www.millais.org.uk/

Millais School is a co-ed secondary school’s for students aged 11–16 in Horsham, West Sussex, England. There is no sixth form. The school has an admission capacity of up to 1500. In 2011 the school became a National Teaching School. The school's catchment area serves Horsham and the villages bordering the town. The Headteacher is Dr. Alison Lodwick. Elizabeth Barnes is the Chairman of Governors.

== Ofsted judgements ==
Millais achieved an Outstanding Ofsted judgement in 2010. As of 2022, the school's most recent inspection was in 2014 with every area (Achievement of pupils, Quality of teaching, Behaviour and safety of pupils, Leadership and management) judged Outstanding.

== History ==
The school's history can be traced back to 1928, when the Oxford Road Senior School opened. This was a co-educational school that in 1932 had an average attendance of 208: 116 boys and 92 girls; by 1938, this number had risen to 294: 153 boys and 141 girls. After 1944, the school split into Horsham secondary boys and girls schools.

As Horsham Secondary School for Girls in 1951, it received pupils from Broadbridge Heath, Slinfold, Southwater, and Colgate. In 1958, it moved to its current location on Depot Road, around the corner from the site of the Boys' school, which had moved to Comptons Lane four years previously. Both schools were renamed The Forest School, and the (former) boys' school still retains this name.

In 1976, the school became a comprehensive, and the following year was renamed The Millais School. In 1980, there were 1,097 girls on roll.

In September 1996, the school was designated a language college and currently teaches five languages: French, Spanish, German, Italian and Chinese. Students are taught French and one other language for their initial three years and must then continue at least one as a full course GCSE in their final two years at the school (though many also continue a second language as either a short course, accelerated or full course GCSE).

Millais has been a training school since 2006 but in 2011 was awarded National Teaching School status and was re-designated as such in 2015; the school operates the Millais Alliance to this end.

The school is named after John Everett Millais, and his monogram, J E M, is incorporated into the school's logo.

In 2014, the school experienced a deliberately-set fire that badly damaged the third floor of a building. The fire was treated as criminal in nature, and a 16-year-old girl was subsequently arrested and charged with arson and intent to endanger life.

Willmott Dixon was contracted to replace Millais' older buildings with a new, 3 story "teaching block", and reception area. This construction started in 2014 and the new buildings opened in 2015.

Through 2024-25 West Sussex County council launched a public consultation to make Millais School co-educational due to a reported deficit of places for male students in the locality. In 2025, the decision was made for the school to go co-educational from September 2026. Millais accepted fifty boys into Year 7 in September 2026.
