= Horsham Museum =

Museum in West Sussex, England

Coordinates: 51°3′41″N 0°19′44″W

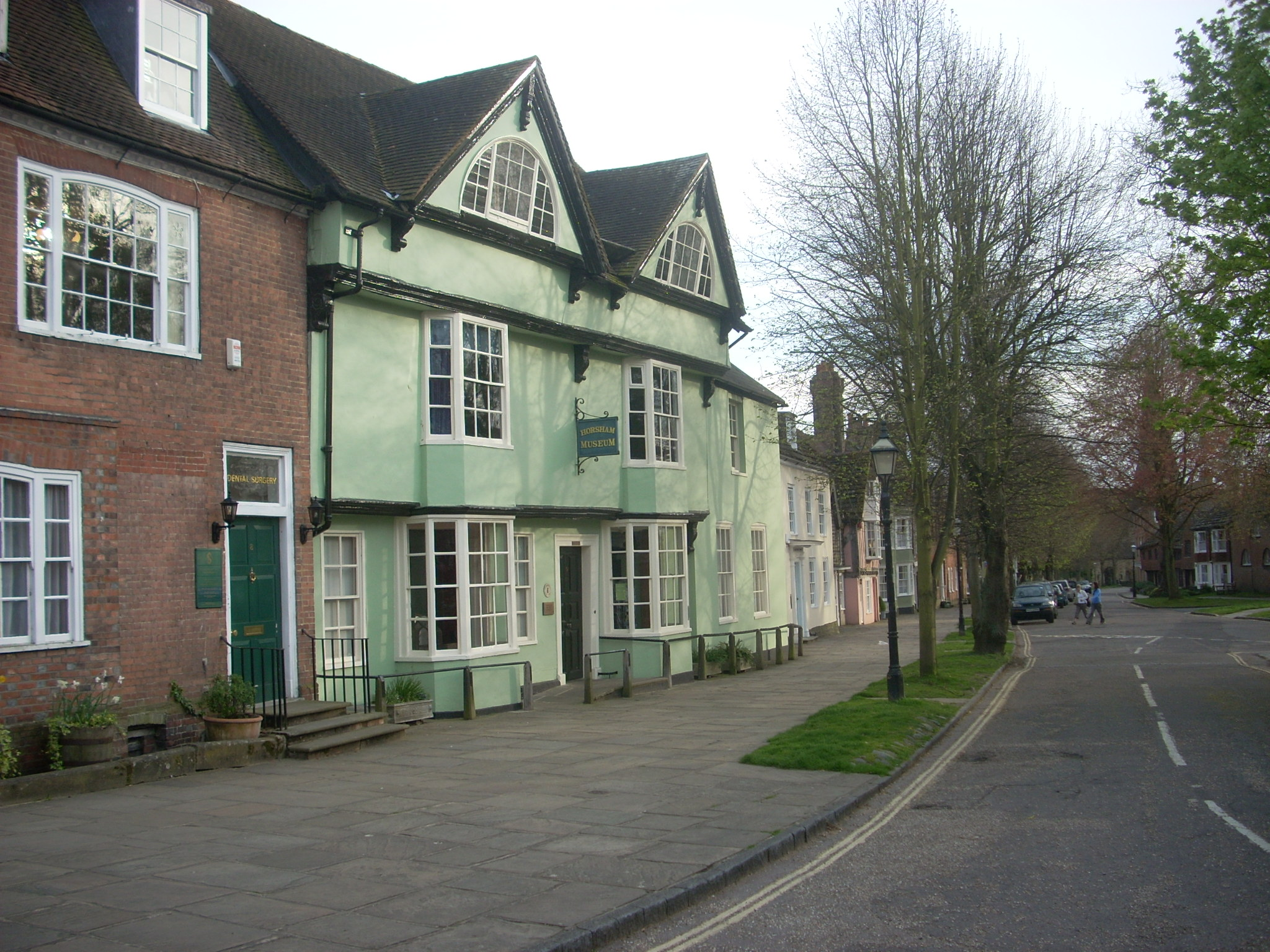
- Horsham Museum in 2009
- Established: 1893
- Location: Causeway House, Horsham, West Sussex, England
- Type: Heritage centre
- Curator: Nikki Caxton
- Website: horshammuseum.org

Listed Building – Grade II*
- Official name: Horsham Museum
- Designated: 20 May 1949
- Reference no.: 1027542

Horsham Museum is a museum in Horsham, West Sussex, England. It was founded in August 1893 by volunteers of the Free Christian (now Unitarian) Church and became part of Horsham District Council in 1974. It is a fully accredited museum and serves both Horsham and its district with the support of the Friends of Horsham Museum and an active volunteer base. The building is Grade II* listed.

== Location ==
Horsham Museum has been situated in Causeway House since 1941, but prior to that the collections found a home in the basement of Park House, North Street. The museum occupies the entirety of the Causeway House site. In addition to the displays, the museum collections also feature:

Archive The archive building was constructed to hold the Albery collection and other documents from the town's manuscript collections.

Library The Curator's Library has over 2,000 books on the museum's collections and can be consulted upon request.

Garden The museum garden was, until 1981, a derelict area after many years of neglect. A project run by the Horsham Museum Society (now Friends of Horsham Museum) led by Sylvia Standing was developed to restore the garden to a fit state. In 2007 the team won the Community Services Gold Award in the Horsham in Bloom Floral Display competition, recognition of the hard work put into the garden throughout the year. Edward Bainbridge Copnall's 10-foot (3.0 m) tall sculpture of the Crucifixion of Jesus, made of coal dust and resin, was installed in St John's Church, Broadbridge Heath, Horsham, in 1964, but was removed in December 2008 to Horsham Museum.

== Exhibits and collections ==
The museum has a large and varied collection arranged in 18 galleries. It has a significant collection of books and memorabilia relating to the Warnham-born poet Percy Bysshe Shelley (1792–1822), including many early editions of his works and that of his second wife Mary Shelley (1797–1851). It also possesses original letters and books relating to the wider Shelley circle.

The Horsham Museum owns a number of prints by local artist John Guille Millais (1865–1931). They also have a significant sculpture by Millais of fighting game birds that is now on permanent display.

Other collections include ceramics, ethnography, local Sussex trades and industries, working life, geology, archaeology, bicycles, and horses. A particular feature of the museum's collections is the Archive of documents relating to Horsham and its history, including the collection of William Albery.

== Museum projects ==
In 2011 the Friends of Horsham Museum were awarded a grant by the Heritage Lottery Fund to conserve and promote the museum's extensive poster collection.

== See also ==
- Grade II* listed buildings in West Sussex
