= Edward Bainbridge Copnall =

British sculptor and painter

- Born: 29 August 1903; Cape Town, Cape Colony
- Died: 18 October 1973 (aged 70); Littleborne, Kent, England
- Education: Goldsmiths College, Royal Academy
- Known for: Sculpture
- Awards: MBE

Edward Bainbridge Copnall MBE (29 August 1903 – 18 October 1973) was a British sculptor and painter. Best known for his architectural and decorative sculptures featuring allegorical and religious subjects. He was the President of the Royal Society of Sculptors from 1961 to 1966.

== Early life and career ==
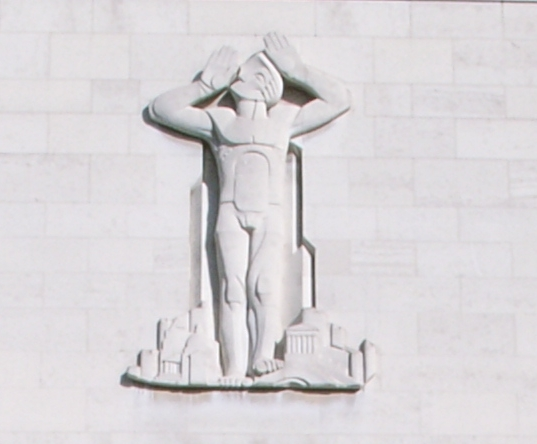
Architectural Aspiration (1934), at RIBA, Portland Place, London

Copnall was born in Cape Town, South Africa in 1903 and moved to Horsham, West Sussex in England as a young child after the death of his mother. His father, photographer Edward White Copnall (born 1878, Isle of Wight), lived and worked in Horsham from 1915 to 1962. His uncle was Liverpool-based portrait painter Frank Thomas Copnall (1870–1948). The Copnall family have a long association with Horsham, the street Copnall Way is named after them.

The exterior sculptural scheme for the Royal Institute of British Architects new building in Portland Place, London, completed in 1934, was an important early commission.

During the Second World War, he worked as a camouflage officer in the Middle East, building dummies as part of the military deception for Operation Crusader. Copnall lived in Burma from 1955 to 1956, and completed 50–60 paintings, mainly portraits, during that time. He was also commissioned to do a memorial of General Aung San, the first Prime Minister of Free Burma. The statue was unveiled in Burma in 1955.

He was president of the Royal Society of Sculptors from 1961 to 1966. Bainbridge Copnall wrote A Sculptor's Manual, published in 1971, and Cycles: An Autobiography – The Life and Work of a Sculptor, published in 2001. His son was artist John Copnall.

== Notable works ==
- Whither, 1925. An allegorical painting depicting a funeral in a Horsham graveyard, Horsham Museum & Art Gallery.
- Percy Harris's monument in the churchyard of St Nicholas Church, Chiswick; the relief carving depicting the resurrection of the dead was carved in the late 1920s and acquired by Harris for display in his garden. The gravestone is Grade II* listed.
- Architectural Aspiration, 1934, exterior and interior, Royal Institute of British Architects
- Sight and Sound panels, 1938, Warner Theatre, Leicester Square, London
- 'Dawn' (aka 'Sunrise'). 1938, 15 foot sculpture, Adelphi building, London
- Wood carvings for the Cunard Line liners RMS Queen Mary and RMS Queen Elizabeth
- St James's Theatre panels, 1959, four horizontal bas-relief panels at the site of St James's Theatre, London. Depicts the heads of Gilbert Miller, George Alexander, Oscar Wilde, and Laurence Olivier and Vivien Leigh)
- Progression, 1959, sculpture on facade of Marks & Spencer, 258-264 Edgware Road, London. Removed 1988.
- The Stag, 1962, Maidstone, Kent. His largest work, originally located in Stag Place, London but moved to Maidstone in 2004. It was cast in aluminium by H.H. Martyn & Co.
- Crucifixion of Jesus, 1964, St John's Church, Horsham. Made from coal dust and resin, it was removed from the facade of the church in December 2008 to Horsham Museum and Art Gallery. Rev Ewen Souter, the vicar at St John's Church called said it was "a horrifying depiction of pain and suffering" that 'scared children and deterred worshippers'.
- Thomas Becket, 1970, St Paul's Cathedral Churchyard, London
- The Boy David, 1971, Chelsea Embankment
- exterior work at St Columba's Church, Pont Street, London
- The Churchill Memorial Screen, 1969, Churchill Shopping Centre Dudley, Partially destroyed and removed in 1992 due to deterioration and vandalism of the appliqué glass. One 1.5 by 1.5 metres (59 in × 59 in) panel showing the Battle of Britain has been restored and has been on display in the Stourbridge Glass Museum since 30 April 2026.

== Gallery ==
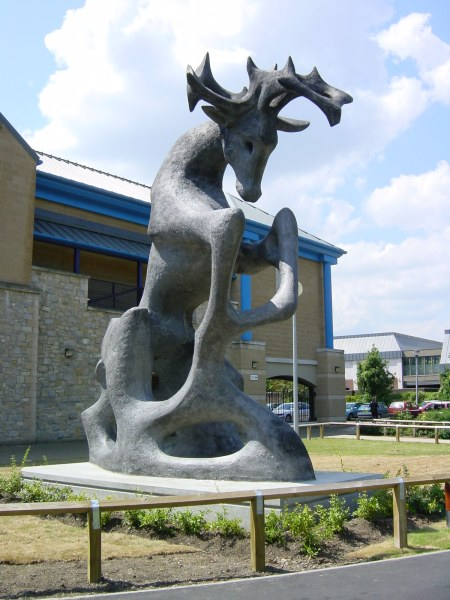
The Stag, Maidstone

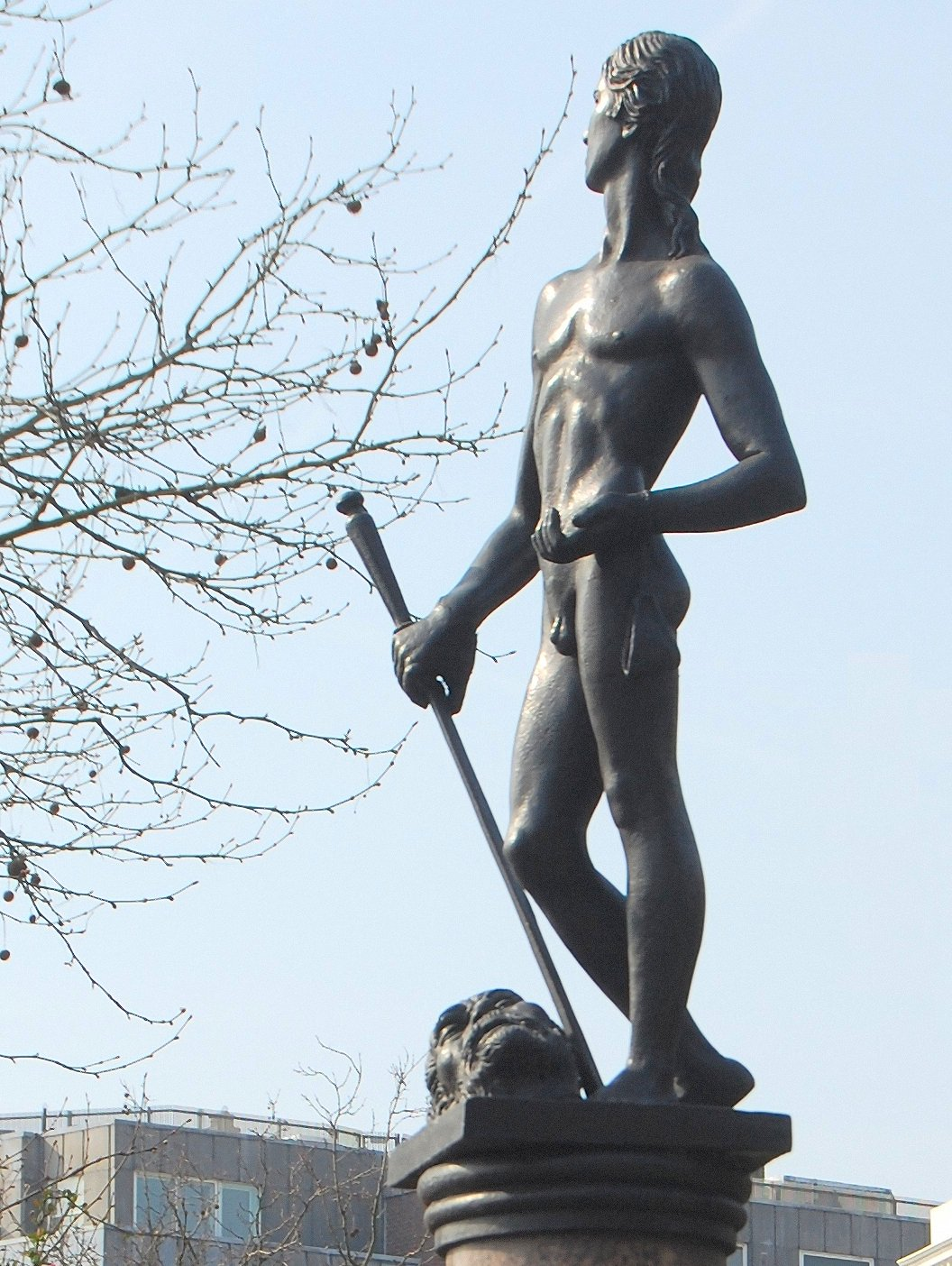
The Boy David, Chelsea Embankment, London

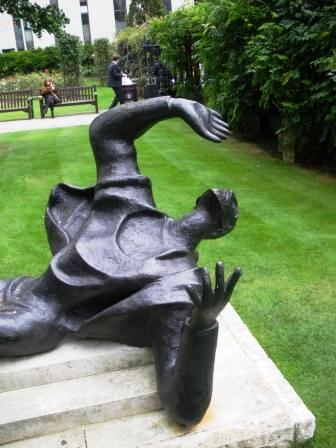
Thomas Becket, St Paul's Churchyard, London

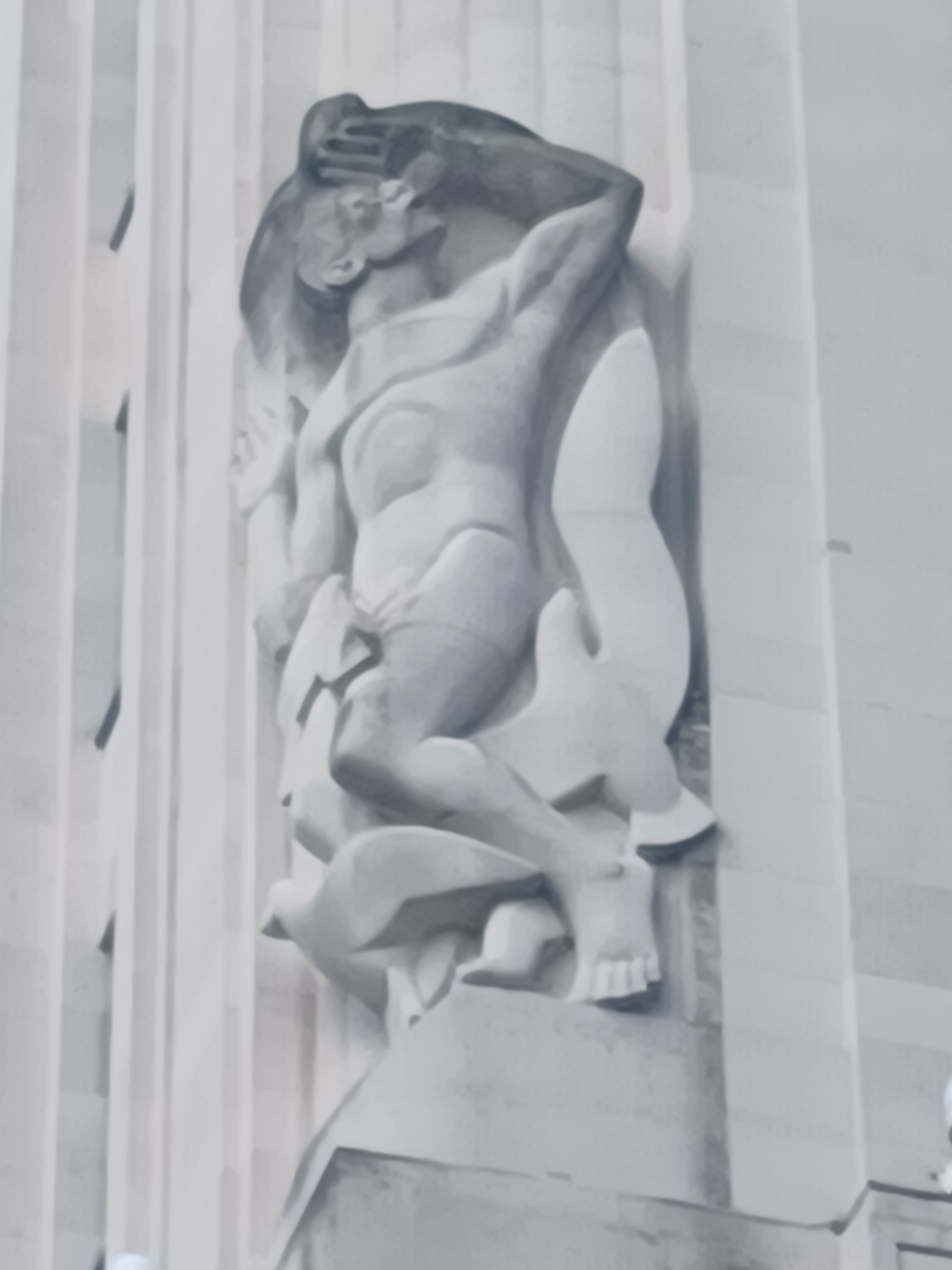
Dawn, (aka Sunrise), Adelphi building, London
