= Horsham =

Market town in West Sussex, England

Coordinates: 51.062°N 0.325°W

- Town
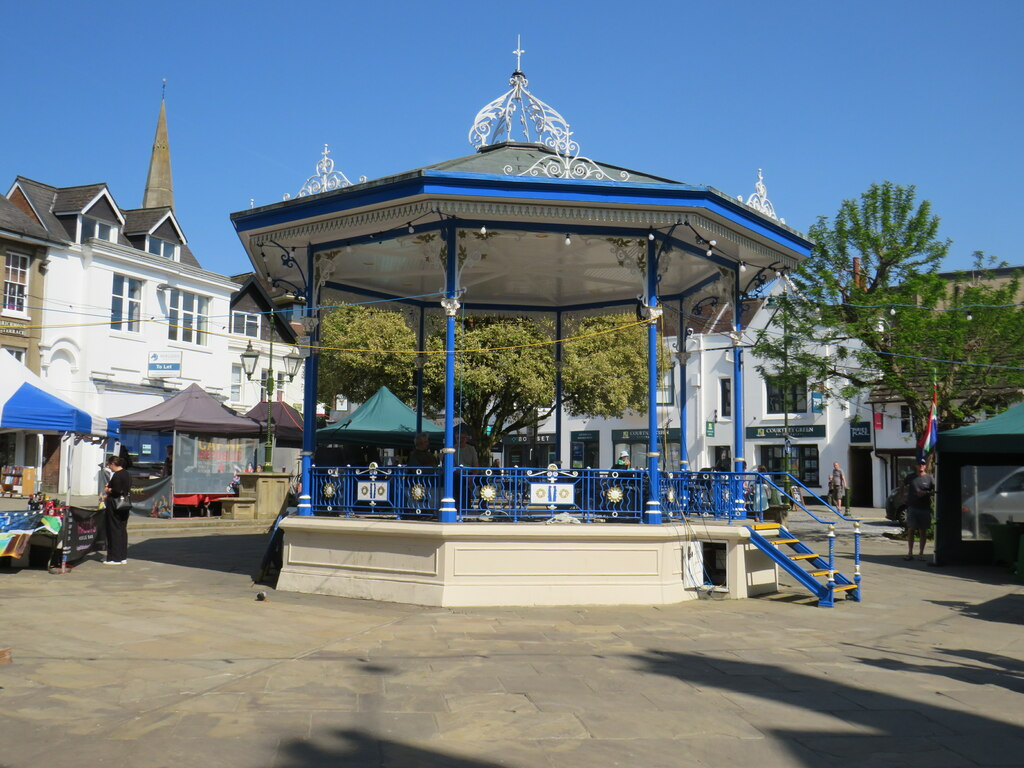
- The Bandstand on Carfax

- Location within West Sussex
- Area: 4.55 sq mi (11.8 km^{2})
- Population: 50,934 (2018 est.)
  - Density: 11,194/sq mi (4,322/km^{2})
- OS grid reference: TQ1730
- Civil parish: Horsham
- District: Horsham
- Shire county: West Sussex
- Region: South East
- Country: England
- Sovereign state: United Kingdom
- Post town: HORSHAM
- Postcode district: RH12, RH13
- Dialling code: 01403
- Police: Sussex
- Fire: West Sussex
- Ambulance: South East Coast
- UK Parliament: Horsham

Horsham (/ˈhɔːrʃəm/) is a market town and civil parish on the upper reaches of the River Arun on the fringe of the Weald, in West Sussex, England. The town lies 31 miles (50 km) south-south-west of London, 18.5 miles (30 km) north-west of Brighton and 26 miles (42 km) north-east of the county town of Chichester. Nearby towns include Crawley to the north-east and Haywards Heath and Burgess Hill to the south-east. It is the administrative centre of the Horsham district. In 2018 it had an estimated population of 50,934.

== Governance ==
There are 3 tiers of local government covering Horsham, at parish (town), at district and county level: Horsham District Council and West Sussex County Council. Much of the built-up area of Horsham is in Horsham parish, but some of the suburbs are included in other parishes, notably North Horsham.

The town is the centre of the parliamentary constituency of Horsham, recreated in 1983. Jeremy Quin had served as Conservative Member of Parliament for Horsham since 2015, succeeding Francis Maude, who held the seat from 1997 but retired at the 2015 general election. Quin was defeated in the 2024 election. John Milne is the town's current MP.

=== Administrative history ===
Horsham was an ancient parish in the Hundred of Singlecross in the Rape of Bramber. The parish covered the town and surrounding rural areas including Broadbridge Heath, Roffey and Southwater.

The town was an ancient borough, being described as a borough from the thirteenth century and also electing members of parliament from 1295 onwards. By the eighteenth century the borough corporation had ceased to have much role in administering the town, instead serving primarily as the means by which the main landowners, the Dukes of Norfolk, controlled the election of MPs. Dealing with such rotten boroughs was part of the motivation behind the Reform Act 1832, which reduced Horsham's representation from two to one MPs and made elections less open to abuse. Following those reforms Horsham's borough corporation stopped functioning.

Local government eventually returned to Horsham in 1875 when the central part of the parish, containing the town, was made a local government district, governed by a local board. Such districts were reconstituted as urban districts under the Local Government Act 1894. The 1894 Act also said that parishes could no longer straddle district boundaries, and so the part of Horsham parish outside the urban district became a separate parish called Horsham Rural.

Horsham Urban District was abolished in 1974, merging with surrounding districts to become the modern Horsham District, which covers a large rural area as well as the town itself. No successor parish was formed so it became unparished. The Horsham Rural parish continued to exist until 1987 when it was divided into the parishes of Broadbridge Heath, North Horsham and Southwater, subject to some adjustments to the boundaries with neighbouring parishes at the same time. On 1 April 2026 Horsham was parished.

== Geography ==
Horsham lies 50 metres (160 ft) above sea level. It is in the centre of the Weald in the Low Weald, at the western edge of the High Weald, with the Surrey Hills of the North Downs to the north and the Sussex Downs of the South Downs National Park to the south. The River Arun rising from ghylls in the St Leonard's Forest area, to the east of Horsham, cuts through the south of the town then makes its way through Broadbridge Heath. The Arun is joined by a number of streams flowing down from the north, which rises around Rusper.

=== Town centre ===
Area	Parts		Sectors
Area	Main street	Public spaces	Sectors
Middle	Middle Street	Carfax	Market; Finance; Medical; Rail transport
North	North Street	Horsham Park	Municipal; Leisure; Sport
East	East Street	Piries Place	Food and Drink
South	Causeway	Market Square	Community • Religion
West	West Street	The Forum; Swan Walk	Retail • Bus transport

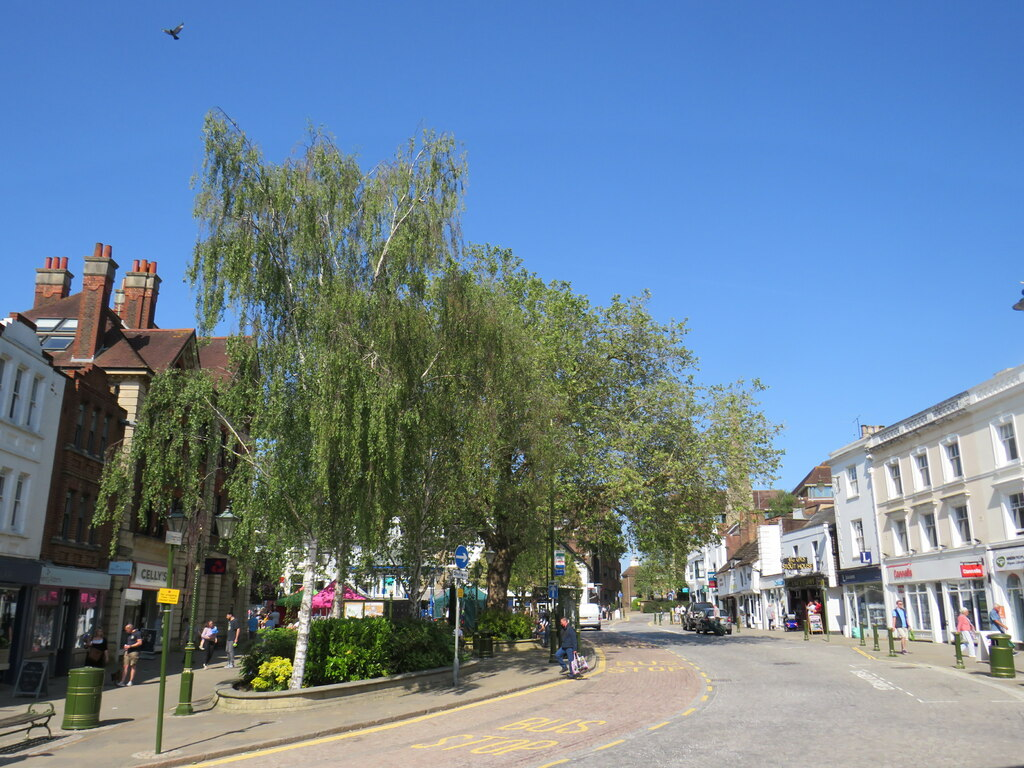
Carfax

The name Carfax is likely of Norman origin – a corruption of 'Quatre Voies' (four ways) or 'Carrefour', a place where four roads meet. The Carfax was formerly known as "Scarfoulkes", the derivation of which is uncertain. Two other places in England share the name: the Carfax in Oxford and the Carfax in Winchester.

The town centre's south is the Causeway. This street consists of houses erected in the 17th, 18th, and early 19th century and is lined with ancient London plane trees. The Horsham Museum is at the north end opposite to the recently developed former headquarters of the RSPCA. At the south end of the Causeway is the Church of England parish church of St. Mary: Norman in origin, rebuilt in the 13th century and restored in 1864–65 by the Gothic revival architect S.S. Teulon. The area immediately to the south east of the parish church is known as Normandy. It was formerly an area of artisans cottages and an ancient well. A short walk along the banks of the Arun in a south-easterly direction is Chesworth Farm, an area of open public access.

Swan Walk is a shopping centre which opened in 1976 and was enclosed with a glass roof in 1989 with the addition of Springfield Court. It takes its name from the Swan Inn that once stood where the pedestrian area now enters West Street, the old name being honoured by the bronze swan statues to the back of the centre and a mosaic in the middle. The shopping centre once enclosed the Capital Theatre which was built in the 1930s and was sandwiched between shops and a multi-storey car park from 1976 until its demolition in early 1983 when Marks & Spencer bought the site to build their store that opened in 1984.

A shopping area and public square, the Forum, opened in 2003 to the south of West Street. Fifty metres south is the River Arun. On the northern bank is Prewett's Mill and on the south side is the town's cricket field.

East Street joins the A281 and passes under a railway bridge (the line from London Victoria to Littlehampton). The road becomes Queen Street and the area becomes Iron Bridge (named after the railway bridge). The area consists of mainly Victorian and Edwardian houses to the north of Brighton Road, whilst to the south, there are areas of inter- and post-war housing. This area is known as the East Side.

Horsham Park, a remnant of the former Hurst Park Estate, is in the northern end of the centre. The park has football pitches, a wildlife pond and tennis courts. Leisure facilities, including a swimming complex and a gymnastic centre, have been built on land around the park.

=== Suburbs ===
Horsham has developed beyond its original boundaries to incorporate some of the smaller hamlets which now form part of the outer districts.

Oakhill was originally known as Grub Street, and developed south of Depot Road in the 19th century.

In keeping with many other towns, new developments to the east of the town centre were rapid in the early Victorian era, and that area of the town became known, as it is today, as New Town. The area contains the Iron Bridge, a steel structure that carries the railway to the south of Horsham.

North Heath was originally used as a label to describe the northern part of the Horsham ancient parish (compared to Southwater to describe that part south of the River Arun), this area was developed as a district in the latter part of the 20th century.

==== Holbrook ====
An area of Horsham named after a feeder stream of the River Arun. It consists of residential housing, the majority of which is of late 20th-century origin. The suburb is substantial enough for two council wards. The hamlet around Old Holbrook House is immediately to the north of the A264, which abuts Holbrook. Holbrook House was previously the home of Sir William Vesey-Fitzgerald, Governor of Bombay and M.P. for Horsham (1852–1875). The Tithe Barn at Fivens Green is the most notable building in the district.

==== Littlehaven ====
This hamlet dates back to the late 18th century, when a small number of houses were in existence, with an inn opening in the early part of the 19th century. A station opened in the area in 1907, originally called Rusper Road Crossing Halt, but later renamed Littlehaven.

==== Needles ====
South-west of the town, the Needles estate was laid out from c. 1955, with a mixture of privately owned and council-built houses and bungalows. The land around Hills Farm nearby was sold for development in 1972 and further development took place in the 1980s. The Needles are named after a local farmhouse, built using timbers from ships wrecked on the Needles rocks off the Isle of Wight.

==== Roffey ====
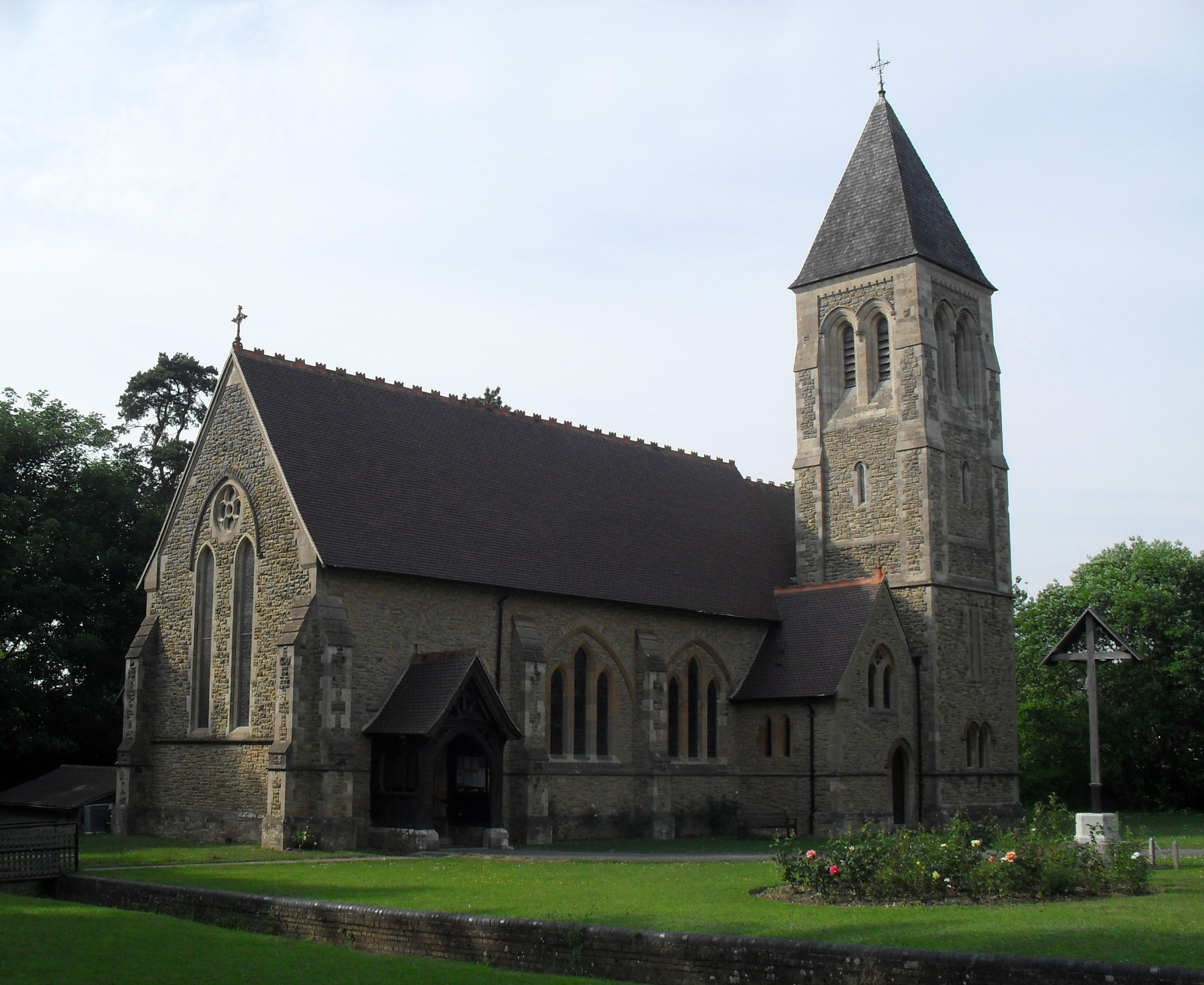
All Saints' Church at Roffey

Roffey is north east of the centre of Horsham and as a hamlet dates back to at least the 13th century, with taxation records of 1296 showing 18 liable people in the area. Kelley's Post Office Directory for 1867 describes 'Roughey' as consisting 'of a few farmhouses and cottages. Here is an iron church, capable of accommodating 80 persons'. Maps of the 1880s show Roffey Corner (still spelt Roughey), but appear to label the hamlet as Star Row, with Roffey in use again by the start of the 20th century.

A railway station opened as Roffey Road Halt in 1907, closing in 1937; it is shown in the location now known as Wimland Road. Roffey is a separate ecclesiastical parish with its own parish church—All Saints' Church on Crawley Road, designed in 1878 by Arthur Blomfield. It replaced a temporary building which was licensed for worship in 1856. Roffey Park Institute is based just outside of Horsham, near Colgate.

==== Tower Hill ====
Tower Hill is a hamlet that lies one mile south from Horsham on a ridge of land containing a sandstone known as Horsham Stone rising above the town. A quarry existed here from 1830 to 1876. Tower Hill consists of housing dating from medieval to late 20th century. It has a public house called the Boar's Head, formerly the Fox and Hounds. The economic importance of quarrying Horsham Stone to Horsham in the 19th century has left a legacy of toponyms including Stone Pit Field, Stone Barn, Stonyhurst and Stone Pit Wood.

==== Trafalgar ====
An area of late 19th and early 20th centuries development on land west of the London Road at North Parade. It consists chiefly of semi-detached houses with corner shops, most of which have closed. Until the mid-20th century, it was known as The Common, after a piece of common land that survived enclosure in Trafalgar Road for many years. Trafalgar forms one of the wards of Horsham Hurst (electoral division) of the Horsham District Council.

=== Weather ===
Horsham holds the UK record for the heaviest hailstone ever to fall. On 5 September 1958, a hailstone weighing 140g (4.9 oz) landed in the town. It was similar in size to a tennis ball and impact speeds have been calculated to be 100 m/s (224 mph).

== Economy ==
Horsham is a market town, formerly trading in cattle, sheep and corn. Its prosperity was built on industries that included brewing, brickmaking, iron-smelting and printing. Although some of these survive, with the exception of iron smelting, they are on a small scale and no longer employ large numbers of workers. In 2014, the important industries were financial services, pharmaceuticals, and technology. Horsham is a commuter town serving London, Gatwick Airport and the south-east coast. The town still has Saturday and Thursday markets on Carfax.

Horsham's town centre has a reputation for small business and also provides multiple retail chain stores. Supermarkets serving the town include branches of Tesco, Sainsbury's, Marks & Spencer, Lidl and Aldi. In 2015, a new £8 million Waitrose and John Lewis at Home joint facility was opened after the closure of the smaller Waitrose that was formerly located in Piries Place.

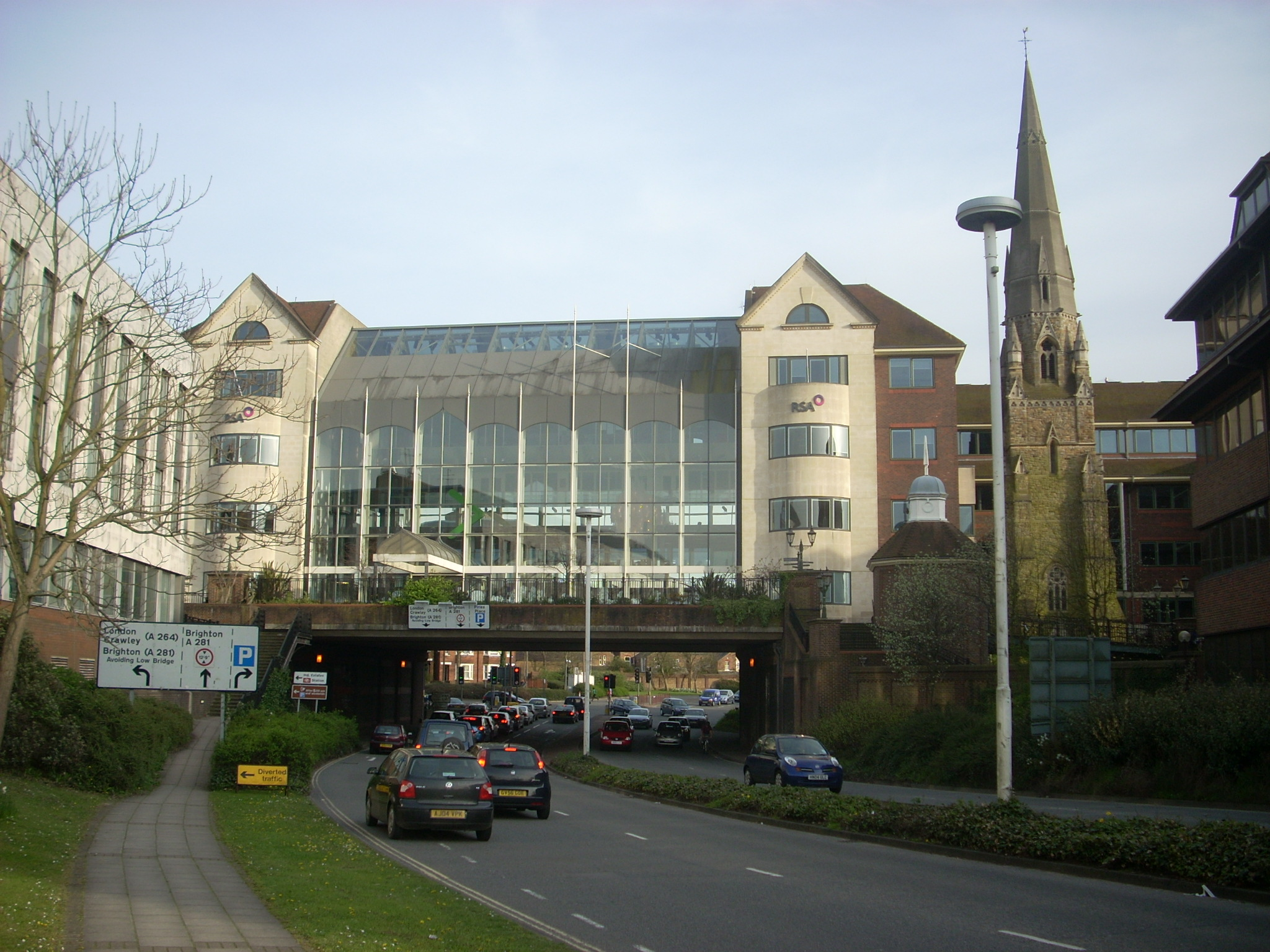
St Mark's Court registered office of the RSA Insurance Group

RSA Insurance Group, an insurance company, has its registered office in Horsham. Sun Alliance merged with Royal Insurance in 1996 to form Royal & Sun Alliance Insurance Group, then renamed RSA Insurance Group in 2008. The company first came to the town in 1965 as Sun Alliance, becoming the town's biggest employer, at its peak, it employed 2,500 people, plus the specialised computer centre called Lennox Wood, sited in Southwater country park to which many of the original Horsham computer department staff were relocated. At its peak, the company occupied several smaller premises on the Carfax, Springfield House near St John the Evangelist Roman Catholic Church, the building that is now a study centre in Hurst Road, Parkside and the whole of the St Mark's complex, and print and security centres in industrial estates sprinkled around Horsham, plus Tricourt House closer to the Carfax and now occupied by a housing association. West Sussex County Council has partially occupied parkside after Royal Sun Alliance vacated the building.

Until 2015, the Swiss-based multinational pharmaceutical company Novartis, formerly Ciba-Geigy before a 1996 merger, was a major employer in the town, but the plant is now closed and the site scheduled for redevelopment.

The RSPCA, an animal welfare charity, has a £16 million headquarters at Southwater near Horsham, built to replace its former headquarters in the centre of the town. Horsham is also the headquarters of video game studio Creative Assembly, as well as the location of its motion capture studio.

== Landmarks ==
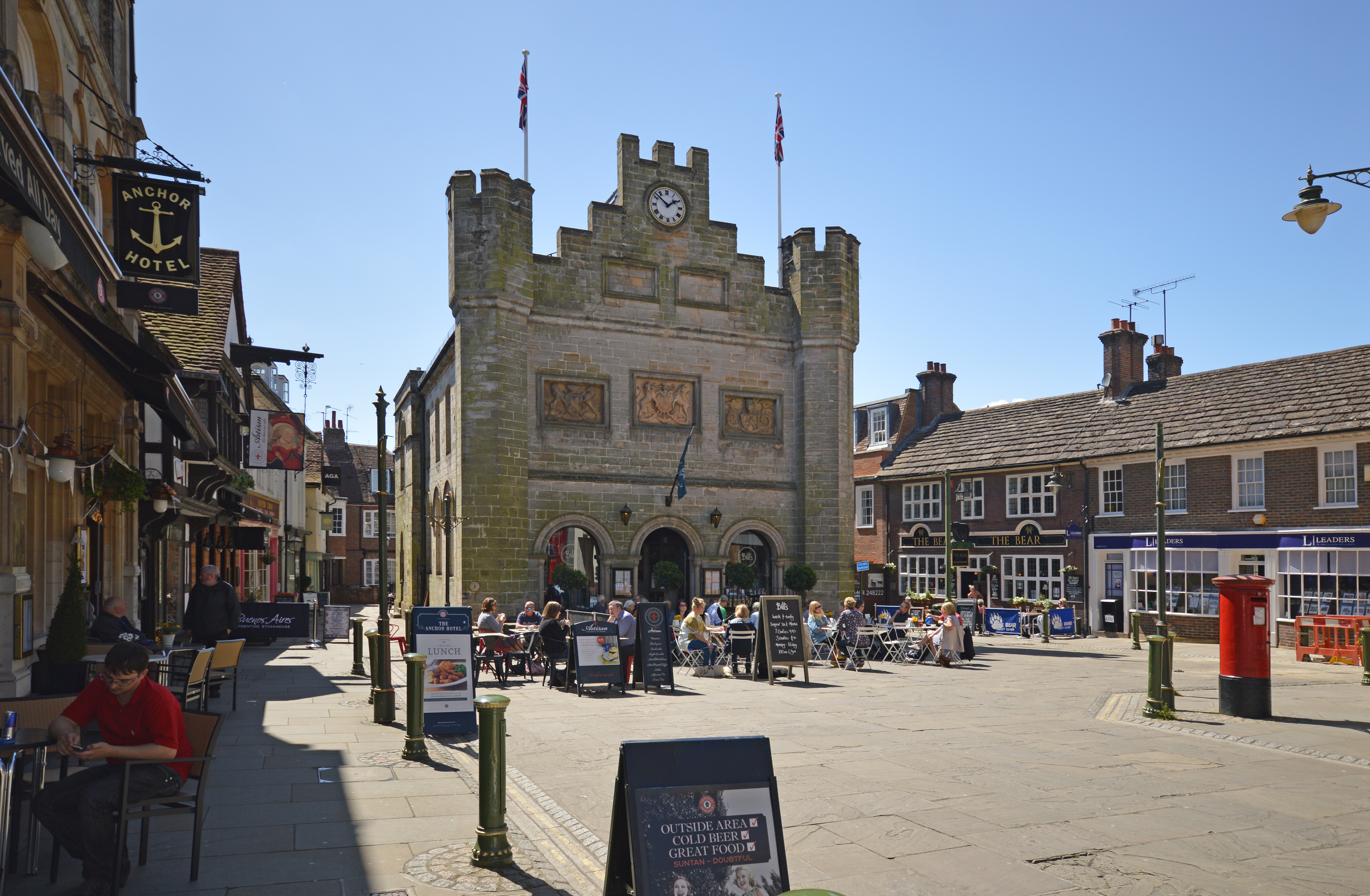
Horsham Town Hall, completed in 1812

The Town Hall in the Market Square is a much-adapted building originally dating from c. 1648 when it was referred to as a 'Market House'. In 1721 a new construction of Portland stone was built containing a poultry and butter market. The building fell into disrepair and was substantially rebuilt around 1812. In 1888, it became the property of Horsham Urban District Council and was again largely rebuilt. The present building is essential of late-Victorian construction, though preserving some aspects of the earlier buildings. It has been used as council offices and as a magistrates court and more recently housed the Horsham Registry Office on the upper floor. The ground floor was still used as an occasional market place until the Town Hall was closed to be let as Bill’s, a restaurant chain in the UK.

Carfax contains the town's memorial to the dead of the two World Wars, as well as a substantial well-used bandstand.

The Parish Church of St. Mary the Virgin is the oldest building in Horsham, having been in continuous use for nearly eight centuries. It is located at the end of the Causeway in Normandy, the oldest existing part of Horsham. It has a ring of ten bells.

The earthworks of the eleventh-century Horsham or Chennelsbrook Castle can be found near Chennells Brook.

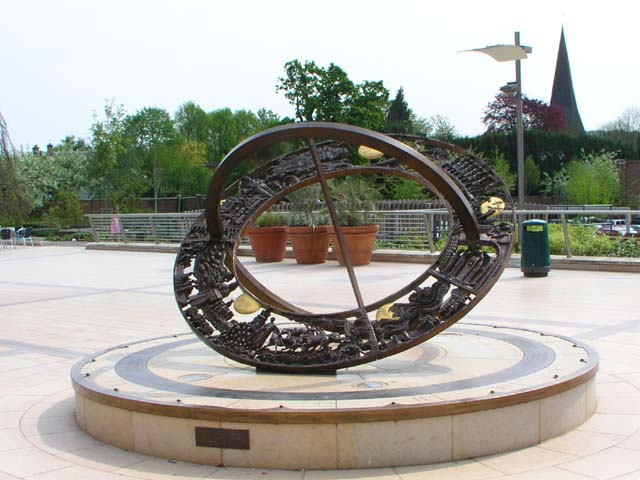
Horsham Heritage Sundial in The Forum, 2007

At the west end of the town centre formerly stood a kinetic water sculpture called the Rising Universe, colloquially known as The Shelley Fountain. It was designed by Angela Conner, and erected to commemorate the poet Percy Bysshe Shelley who was born at Field Place in Broadbridge Heath, near Warnham, two miles west from Horsham centre. The fountain was designed to release a torrent of six and a half tons of water periodically; it was 45 ft across at its base, standing 28 ft high. It carried a plaque bearing one of his poems 'Mont Blanc'. The fountain was turned off in the spring of 2006 to save water; despite recycling, it used 180 gallons a day to cover evaporation and filtration losses. However, the council has made water saving efficiencies elsewhere and the fountain was turned on again on 13 November 2006, its tenth birthday but was turned off again after that Christmas. In May 2008, the fountain was turned off again due to the failure of its main hydraulic cylinder. On 19 January 2009 the fountain was fenced off for repairs. It was reopened without the fountain functioning. The fountain was again repaired at the start of March 2011 at a cost of more than £30,000 and was removed altogether in June 2016 with cost of upkeep being cited as the main reason.

== Transport ==
=== Railway ===
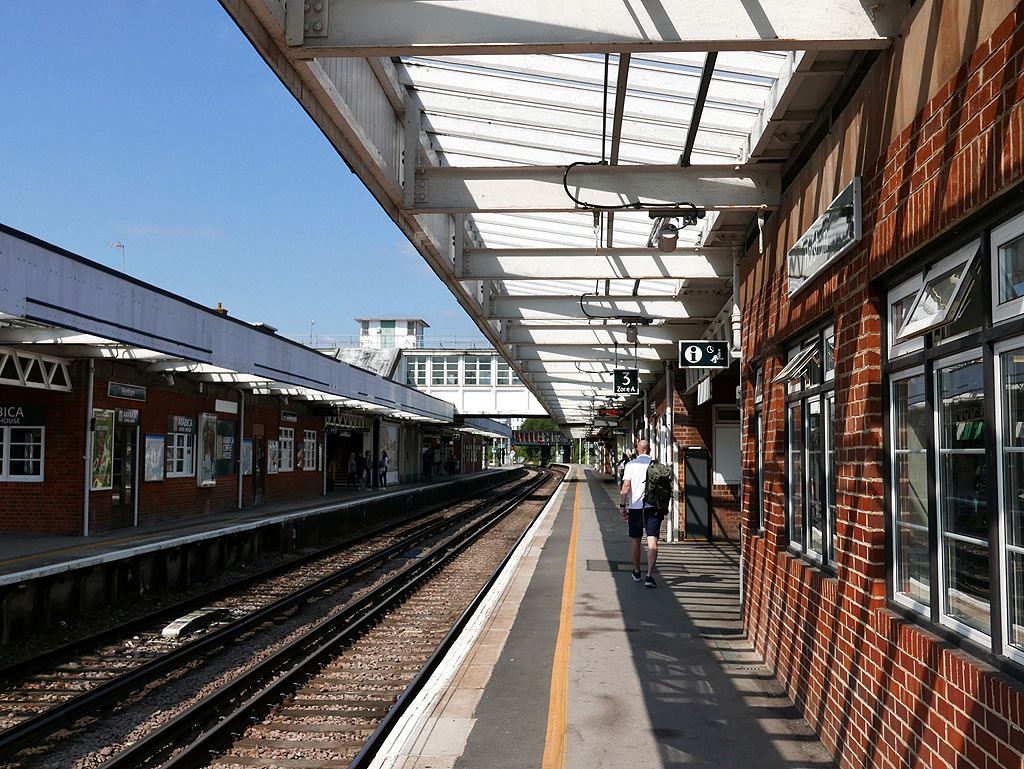
Horsham railway station

Horsham railway station lies on the Arun Valley Line, which connects Chichester, Crawley, Gatwick Airport and London Victoria.

Services are operated by Govia Thameslink Railway, under two sub-brands:

- Southern runs two trains per hour in each direction between London Victoria and Portsmouth Harbour; trains divide or attach at Horsham to form twice-hourly services to and from Bognor Regis.
- Thameslink operates two services per hour to Peterborough.

Other stations within or near the town are:

- Littlehaven is in the north-east of the town
- Christ's Hospital serves the west of Horsham.

=== Buses ===
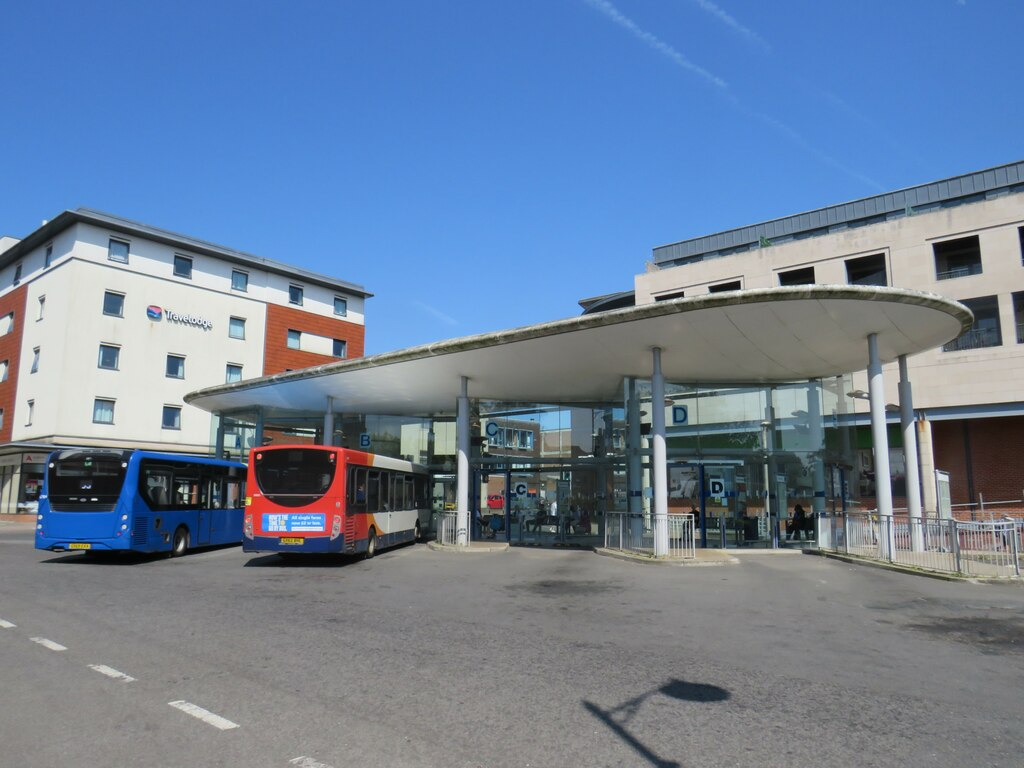
Horsham bus station

Bus services are provided by Metrobus, Stagecoach South and Compass Travel; destinations include Brighton, Crawley, Gatwick Airport, Dorking, Guildford, Worthing, Pulborough, Burgess Hill, Storrington and Haywards Heath.

=== Road ===
Horsham lies at the junction of three main routes, with the dual carriageway A24 running north to south route from London and Dorking to Worthing. The A264 links Horsham to Crawley and the M23 to the east by a modern dual carriageway and to the A29 to the west. The A281 runs between Guildford and Brighton.

=== Air ===
Horsham is located 20 km (12 mi) from Gatwick Airport and 65 km (40 mi) from Heathrow Airport.

=== Paths ===
Cyclists, pedestrians and horseriders can reach Guildford and Shoreham via the Downs Link, a long-distance shared-use path, which follows the now-disused Horsham-Guildford and Horsham-Shoreham railway lines and passes through Southwater, just to the south of Horsham.

== Education ==
The main secondary schools in Horsham are:

- Tanbridge House School (mixed comprehensive)
- Millais School (girls' comprehensive)
- The Forest School (mixed comprehensive)
- Bohunt Horsham (mixed comprehensive).

The College of Richard Collyer is the sixth form college serving Horsham. Founded in 1532, it is known more commonly as Collyer's and is situated on Hurst Road.

As of July 2020, West Sussex County Council announced proposals to alter The Forest School from a single sex boys' school to a co-educational school from September 2021 entry.

Horsham is home to the following well known independent schools:

- Christ's Hospital, one of the oldest schools in the country, established in 1552 by Edward VI. An independent co-educational 11–18 boarding and day school
- Farlington School, an independent day and boarding school for children aged 4–18 at Strood Green about three miles from Horsham travelling towards Rudgwick. Originally founded as a girls' school, from 2020, Farlington will be accepting boys as well as girls into certain year groups.

== Media ==
Local news and television programmes are provided by BBC South and ITV Meridian. Television signals are received from the Midhurst TV transmitter. Local radio stations are BBC Radio Sussex on 95.1 FM, Heart South on 97.5 FM, and Greatest Hits Radio West Sussex on 106.6 FM. The town is served by the local newspaper, West Sussex County Times which publishes on Thursdays.

== Sport ==
=== Cricket ===
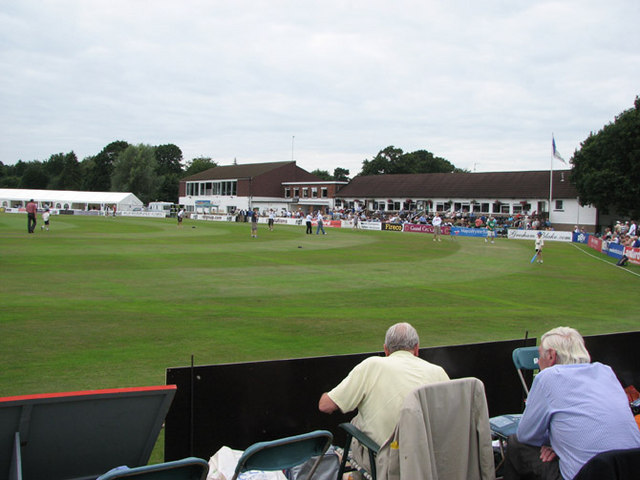
Horsham Cricket Club, 2009

Horsham Cricket Club play their home matches at Cricketfield Road, which used to be used twice a season by Sussex County Cricket Club for matches. Although cricket was played in Horsham before 1768, the first recorded game of a town side was on 8 August 1771, which is when Horsham Cricket Club was created. The club has played various locations over the years, before settling at the present ground in 1851.

Horsham Cricket Club were national champions in 2005. Current England international Jofra Archer is a notable recent alumnus. Founded in 1921, Horsham Trinity Cricket Club play at the Victory Road recreation ground (Trafalgar).

=== Football ===
Horsham F.C. is the town's senior football club and, as of the 2024–25 season, play in the Nation League South. They have had sporadic success through their history, winning the Sussex Senior Cup on eight occasions, winning the Isthmian League Cup in 2022 and reaching the first round proper of the FA Cup on five occasions, in 1947–48, 1966–67, 2007–08, 2021–22 and 2023–24, and the second round proper on two occasions, in 2007-08 (playing Swansea City, first drawing 1–1 at Queen Street, then losing 6–2 in a replay at the newly opened Liberty Stadium) and 2023–24 (losing 3–0 away against Sutton United). The team currently play at the Hop Oast Stadium (known for sponsorship purposes as the Camping World Community Stadium), after it was opened in June 2019. This followed a period of homelessness after their Queen Street stadium was demolished in 2008.

Horsham YMCA F.C., founded in 1898, currently play in the Premier Division of the Southern Combination Football League in 2024–25. They play their home games at Gorings Mead in the Iron Bridge part of Horsham.

Broadbridge Heath F.C. play in the Isthmian League Division One South East as of the 2024–25 season. They play at the High Wood Hill Sports Ground.

Roffey F.C. were promoted to the Southern Combination Football League Premier Division for the 2024–25 season. They play at Bartholomew Way in Roffey in the north of Horsham.

=== Rugby ===
Horsham Rugby Club, who play at the Coolhurst Ground, are the town's premier Rugby Union team. They were founded in 1928 with their first headquarters at the Station Hotel opposite Horsham Station. Initially, the team played on farmland adjacent to the Warnham Park Estate, but from 1930 until 1968, they were settled at Horsham Cricket Club. The club grew considerably after the war with further pitches rented in Horsham Park. In 1972 they moved to their present home. At the end of the 2018–19 season, Horsham 1st XV was promoted to London 1 South, the highest level the club has ever achieved. Following the restructure of the leagues Horsham have played in Regional 2 South East.

Holbrook RUFC is a smaller rugby club, based at The Holbrook Club in north Horsham. It was formed in 1971 as Sunallon RFC, which was the name of the Sun Alliance Sports & Social Club. This developed into Sun Alliance RFC and following a merger with the Liverpool-based Royal Insurance in 1996, into Royal & Sun Alliance RFC (RSA). Holbrook RFC had two teams as of the 2014 season, with the 1sts in Sussex League 1, and 2nds in Sussex League 3.

=== Other sport ===
Horsham Hockey Club who play their home matches at Broadbridge Heath Leisure Centre.

Horsham Gymnastic Club have produced top female gymnasts a number of whom have progressed to the England and Great Britain national squads.

In the weeks preceding the London 2012 Olympic Games, the Grenadian Olympic Team trained at Broadbridge Heath Leisure Centre, which is on the outskirts of the town.

== Public services ==
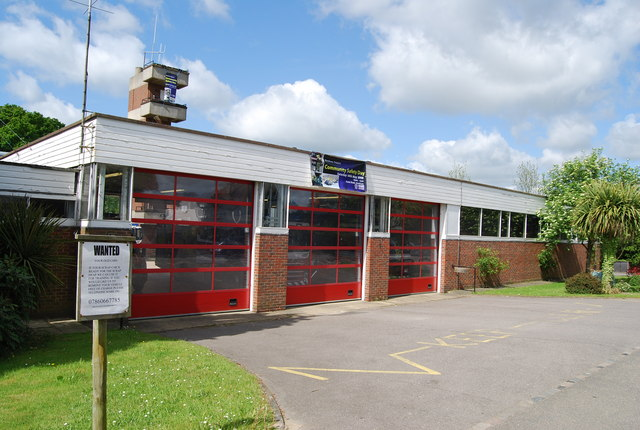
Horsham Fire Station, 2009

Horsham Hospital, is open on weekdays and is located on Hurst Road. The town has its own law courts, ambulance station, fire station and police station, also located on Hurst Road. The Statutory emergency fire and rescue service is provided by the West Sussex Fire and Rescue Service. The territorial police force for Horsham and surrounding areas is Sussex Police.

The Registry of births, deaths and marriages is located in Park House, North Street in central Horsham.

== Community facilities ==
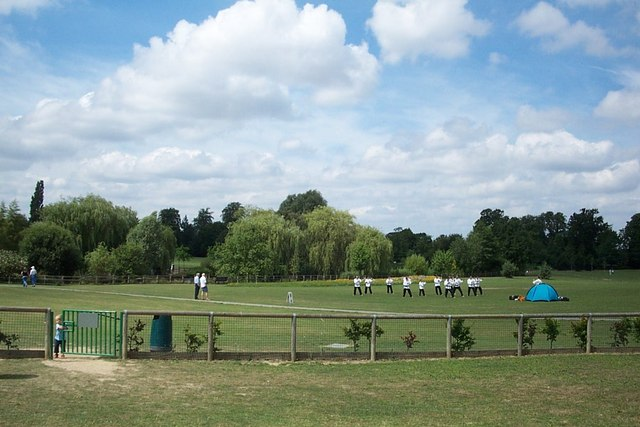
Horsham Park

Horsham Park immediately to the north of central Horsham is 24 hectares of open space for the use of the people of Horsham. It contains an 18th-century country house used in part by the Horsham District Council, formal gardens, and a maze. At the eastern side is The Pavilions in the Park leisure centre, with a gym and a 25 metre swimming pool run by a private company for Horsham District Council. A BMX and Skate park is located on the Hurst Road side of Horsham Park. The remaining space is used extensively for leisure pursuits such as tennis, football and rugby.

Horsham Museum is located on the Causeway in a half-timbered medieval house. It has local history objects displayed in twenty-six galleries. Situated on North Street is The Capitol Theatre, Horsham, the venue (formerly Horsham Arts Centre) features a theatre, 2 cinema screens, a studio and gallery. On Lower Tanbridge Way is a two-storey modernised library run by West Sussex County Council.

== Cultural references ==
The first illustrated history of Horsham was written in 1836 by Howard Dudley at the age of 16. It includes descriptions of St Mary's Church and other buildings along with lithographs and wood-cut images of the town. The book entitled The History and Antiquities of Horsham has been reproduced in full to enable research online.

Sir Arthur Conan Doyle had the fictitious Openshaw family, in the Sherlock Holmes story The Five Orange Pips, residing in the town.

== Notable deceased residents ==
- John Roland Abbey (1894–1969), book collector.
- Ian Allan (1922–2015), publisher of transport titles via his company Ian Allan Publishing.
- George Bax Holmes (1803–1887), palaeontologist.
- Robert Blatchford (1851–1943), author and socialist.
- Wilfred Brown (1922–1971), singer.
- Henry Burstow (1826–1916), singer and bell-ringer, important to the early twentieth-century folk-song revival, and for his 'Reminiscences of Horsham', published in 1911.
- Matthew Caffyn (1628–1714), British General Baptist preacher and writer.
- Samuel Carpenter (1649–1714), First Treasurer and Deputy Governor of Pennsylvania. Born in 1649 in Horsham. His father was John Carpenter, the Sheriff of Horsham, who was murdered while attending his duties in Horsham on 9 August 1671.
- Edward Bainbridge Copnall (1903–1973), artist and president of the Royal Society of British Sculptors, lived in Horsham from an early age. One of his works, a sculpture titled 'The Astronomer', was presented to the College of Richard Collyer in the town by his sister Phyllis Millar and is on display in the upper quadrangle. Other examples of his work are kept by Horsham Museum.
- John Copnall (1928–2007), artist and teacher, a leading English abstract painter and teacher at the London Central School of Art and Design.
- Walter Crane (1845–1915) artist and book illustrator died at Horsham.
- Raymond Cusick (1928–2013), creator of the Daleks (Doctor Who)
- Howard Dudley (1820–1864), wrote the first illustrated history of Horsham in 1836.
- Walter Dendy Sadler (1854–1923) artist and painter, was brought up in Horsham.
- Frederick Gough (1901–1977), an army major at the Battle of Arnhem, served as Horsham's Member of Parliament from 1951 to 1964.
- Agnes Harben née Bostock (1841–1961), suffragist leader who also supported the militant suffragette hunger strikers, and was a founder of the United Suffragists.
- Henry Devenish Harben (1874–1967), barrister and Liberal Party politician who later joined the Labour Party, notable supporter of women's suffrage
- Catherine Howard (c.1520–1542), one of King Henry VIII's wives, lived in Horsham.
- Robert Henry Hurst (1817–1905). Liberal Member of Parliament for Horsham from 1865 to 1868, and from 1875 to 1876.
- Thomas Hutchinson (1698-1769) English clergyman and classical scholar.
- Hammond Innes (1913–1998), author, was born in Clarence Road.
- Chrystabel Leighton-Porter (1913–2000), model for the "Jane" cartoon during WWII.
- Bernard Lintott, (1675–1736), English publisher.
- George Marshall (1753–1819), curate and chaplain, promotor of education for the poor.
- Christopher Martin-Jenkins (1945–2013), cricket journalist and broadcaster.
- Thomas Medwin (1788–1869), poet and biographer of Lord Byron and his cousin Percy Bysshe Shelley.
- John Guille Millais (1865–1931), painter, naturalist and author, son of the Pre-Raphaelite painter John Everett Millais.
- Raoul Millais (1901–1999), artist, son of John Guille Millais.
- Edward Mote (1797–1874), Writer of the hymn 'My hope is built on nothing less' and was minister of Rehoboth Baptist Church in New Street for 26 years where he is buried.
- John Pilfold (1769–1834), Royal Navy officer most noted for his command of HMS Ajax at the Battle of Trafalgar.
- William Pollard (1828–1893), Quaker writer.
- Hugh James Rose (1795–1838), Theologian who became principal of King's College London, Vicar of St Mary's 1821–1827.
- Hilary Stratton (1906–1985), sculptor from Barns Green and teacher at the Horsham School of Art.
- Lt.-Col. George Styles (1928–2006), army bomb-disposal expert, was educated at Collyer's School.
- Eric Thompson (1929–1982), narrator of the British version of The Magic Roundabout, was educated at Collyer's School.
- William Vesey-Fitzgerald (1818–1885), Governor of Bombay, M.P. for Horsham who lived at Holbrook.
- Howard Vincent (1849–1908), Conservative Party Member of Parliament, barrister and police official who was born at Slinfold.

== Notable living residents ==
- Chris Aldridge – BBC Radio 4 continuity announcer and newsreader who was born in Horsham.
- Mark Alexander – British artist who was born in Horsham
- Will Collar – footballer with Stockport County and Brighton & Hove Albion
- Carl Donnelly – comedian
- Mark Hawkins – Great Britain Handball player, represented Team GB at 2012 Summer Olympics
- Jamie Hewlett – Artist/cartoonist and creator of the comic strip Tank Girl and co-creator of the band Gorillaz. He attended both Tanbridge House School and the former Northbrook Art College
- Alan Mullery – Former footballer with Fulham and Tottenham Hotspur, former manager of Crystal Palace and Brighton and Hove Albion
- Chris Nash – Nottinghamshire CCC cricketer
- Simon Nye – Writer of Men Behaving Badly, attended Collyer's when it was still a grammar school
- Jolyon Palmer – Former British Formula One driver for Renault Sport
- Paul Parker – England and Sussex CCC cricketer (captain); attended Collyer's School
- Joshua Powell – Conservation biologist and #WWFVoices series host for World Wildlife Fund
- David Sedaris – Novelist/comedian
- Chris Simms – Crime thriller writer who was born in Horsham
- Michael Thornely – Leicestershire CCC cricketer
- Holly Willoughby – TV presenter and model attended Collyer's Sixth Form College

== Comments ==
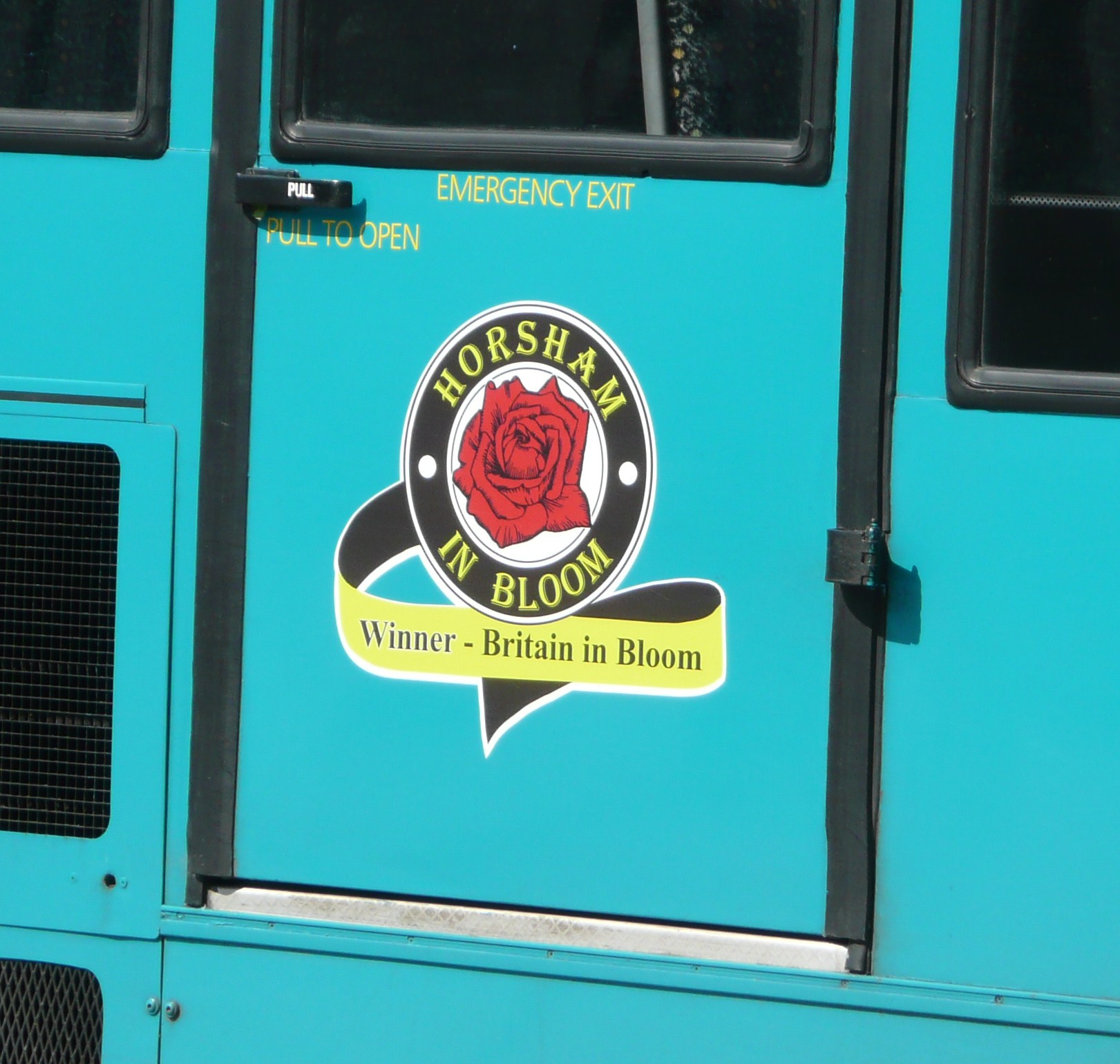
An emblem on the side of an Arriva bus celebrating Horsham's win of the Britain in Bloom contest.

In October 2006, Horsham was pronounced the second best place to live in the UK, only beaten by Winchester. This was claimed by a Channel 4 show, The 10 Best and Worst Places to Live in the UK.

The programme mentioned that:

- Horsham was in the top 15% for low crime
- About 70% of students gained 5 A* to C grades at GCSE
- Over 85% of the workforce is economically active
- Horsham has a high life expectancy of 76 years for men and 83 for women
- There were two official homeless people living in Horsham.

In 2007, a Reader's Digest poll put Horsham as the 25th best place in mainland Britain to bring up a family.

On 27 September 2007, Horsham was awarded a Gold Award as the overall winner of Britain in Bloom in the large town/small city category. It also has the honour of being presented with the Royal Horticultural Society's Bloomin' Wild award, which reflected the theme for year's national judging.

== Twinning ==
Horsham District twinnings:

- St Maixent L'Ecole, Poitou-Charentes, France
- Lage, North Rhine-Westphalia, Germany

Horsham Town twinnings:

- Lerici, Liguria, Italy
- Horsham, Victoria, Australia
