= Goodwood =

Goodwood may refer to:

== Events ==
- Goodwood Festival of Speed, a motorsport event in the United Kingdom
- Glorious Goodwood, a horseracing event in the United Kingdom
- Goodwood Revival, a historical motorsport event in the United Kingdom

== Places and structures ==
=== Australia ===
- Goodwood, South Australia, Australia
  - Electoral district of Goodwood, a former electoral district in South Australia
- Goodwood, Tasmania, Australia

=== Canada ===
- Goodwood, Nova Scotia
- Goodwood, Ontario

=== South Africa ===
- Goodwood, Cape Town, South Africa

=== United Kingdom ===
- Goodwood, Leicestershire, England
- Goodwood House, West Sussex, England - the estate includes:
  - Goodwood plant, of Rolls-Royce Motor Cars
  - Chichester/Goodwood Airfield, West Sussex, England
  - Goodwood Circuit, West Sussex, England
  - Goodwood Racecourse, West Sussex, England
  - Goodwood Cricket Club, West Sussex, England

=== United States ===
- Goodwood Plantation, Tallahassee, Florida
- Goodwood (Richmond, Massachusetts), a historic house
- Goodwood (Upper Marlboro, Maryland), a historic house

== Other uses ==
- Goodwood, a 2018 Australian crime novel by Holly Throsby
- Operation Goodwood, a World War II British military operation during the Battle of Normandy, July 1944
- Operation Goodwood (naval), a series of Royal Naval attacks on the German battleship Tirpitz in August 1944 during World War II
- Operation Goodwood (1968−1969), actions fought between the 1st Australian Task Force and the Viet Cong and North Vietnamese Army during the Vietnam War
