= Charles Gordon-Lennox, 11th Duke of Richmond =

British aristocrat

His Grace The Duke of Richmond CBE DL
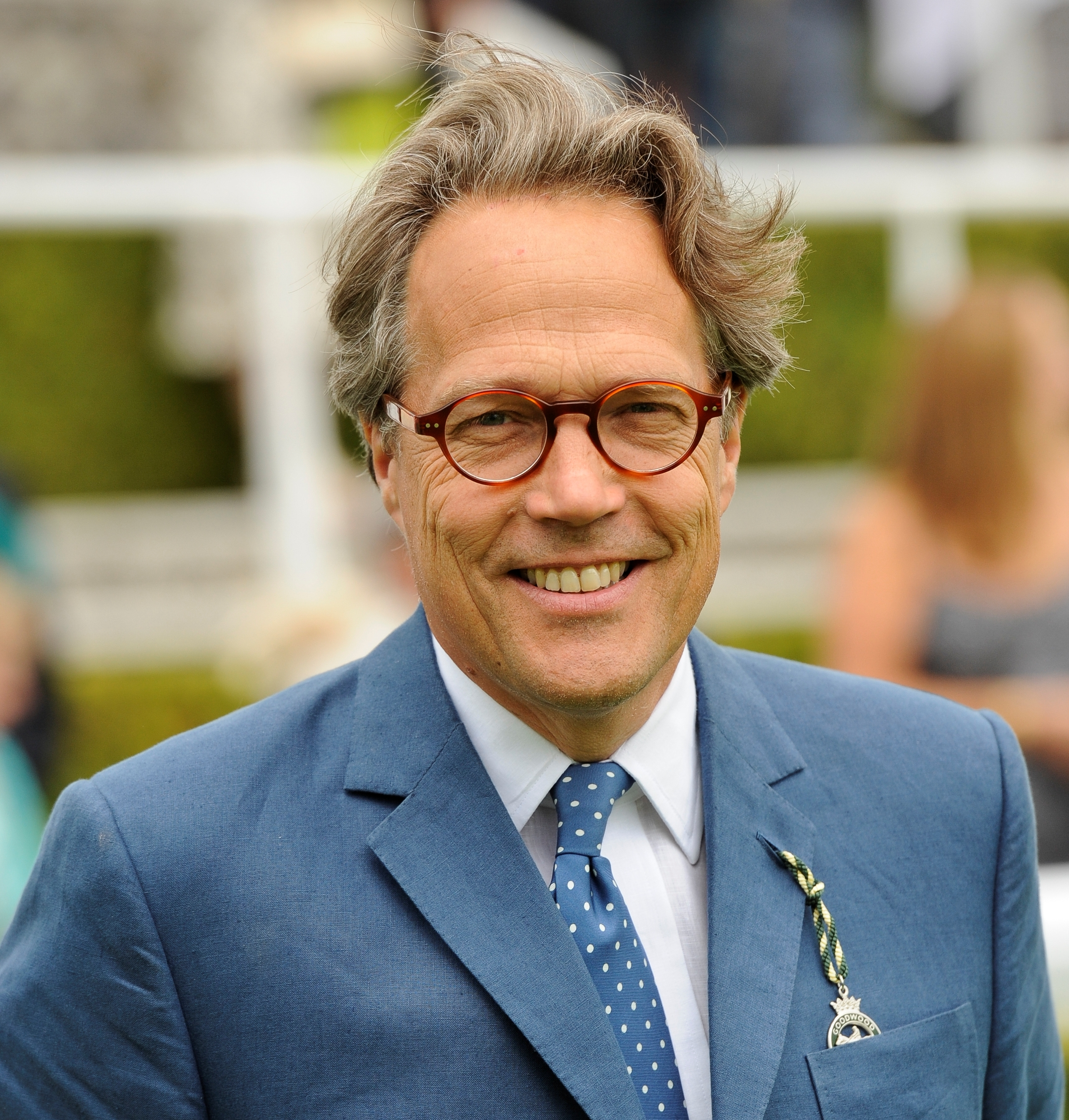
- The Duke, then styled Lord March, in 2011
- Born: Charles Henry Gordon-Lennox; 8 January 1955 (age 71)
- Title: 11th Duke of Richmond; 11th Duke of Lennox; 11th Duke of Aubigny; 6th Duke of Gordon, etc.
- Spouses: Sally Clayton (m. 1976; div. 1989) Hon. Janet Elizabeth Astor (m. 1991)
- Children: 5
- Parents: Charles Gordon Lennox, 10th Duke of Richmond (father); Susan Grenville-Grey (mother)

Signature
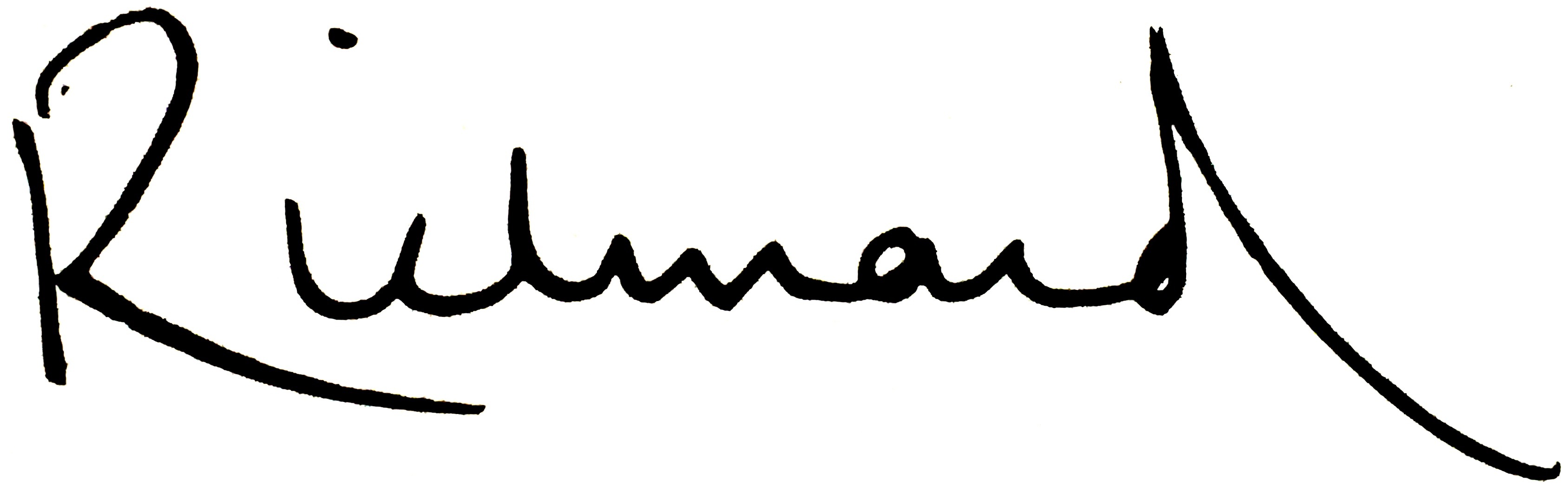

Charles Henry Gordon-Lennox, 11th Duke of Richmond, 11th Duke of Lennox, 11th Duke of Aubigny, 6th Duke of Gordon, CBE, DL (born 8 January 1955), styled Lord Settrington until 1989 and then Earl of March and Kinrara until 2017, is a British aristocrat and owner of the Goodwood Estate in Sussex. He is the founder of the Goodwood Festival of Speed and the Goodwood Revival.

The Duke of Richmond serves as President of the British Automobile Racing Club, Patron of the TT Riders Association, and is an honorary member of the British Racing Drivers Club, the Guild of Motoring Writers and the 500 Owners Club. He was awarded an honorary Fellowship by the University of Chichester in 2009.

== Early life ==
Charles Henry Gordon-Lennox was born on 8 January 1955 to Charles Henry Gordon-Lennox and Susan Monica Grenville-Grey, then the Earl and Countess of March and Kinrara. From birth, he was styled Lord Settrington, as the grandson of the then Duke of Richmond, via the senior male line. Settrington was educated at Eton College which he left at the earliest possible opportunity to pursue a career in film and photography – an interest he had enjoyed from an early age – subsequently working for the film director Stanley Kubrick on the film Barry Lyndon, aged 17.

== Goodwood ==
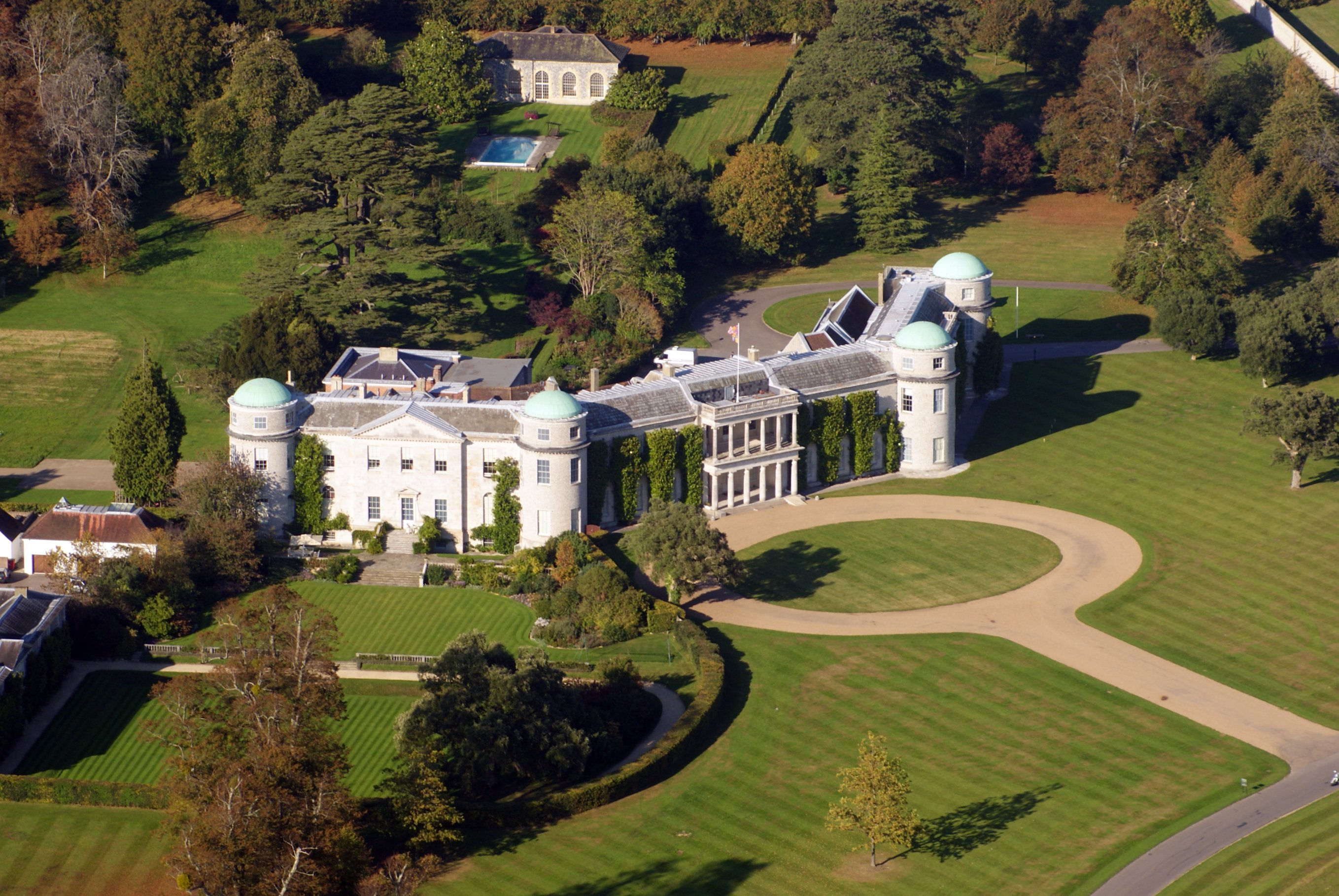
Goodwood House in October 2011

In 1995, the Earl of March, as he was then styled, moved from London to his family seat, Goodwood House, to take over management of the estate, following family tradition of the estate management devolving upon the heir apparent when he turns forty.

Motorsport at Goodwood was started by his grandfather, Freddie March, who opened the Goodwood Motor Circuit in 1948. March established the Festival of Speed at Goodwood House in 1993. He then brought motor racing back to the circuit, which had closed in 1966, with the creation of the Goodwood Revival in 1998. The Duke's name appears in the video game Gran Turismo 6, when he sends players an invitation related to the Goodwood Festival of Speed.

The Goodwood Estate covers 12,000 acres to the north of Chichester. The Goodwood Estate Company is a diverse portfolio of businesses which includes: Goodwood Racecourse; a 4,000-acre organic farm; two eighteen-hole golf courses; Goodwood Aerodrome along with its flying school and aero club; and a 91-bedroom hotel. The Group employs over 550 people and attracts 800,000 visitors to the estate each year. Also on the estate are Goodwood Cricket Club and the headquarters of Rolls-Royce Motor Cars.

In 2006, the Duke was appointed Deputy Lieutenant (DL) for West Sussex, and was appointed Commander of the Order of the British Empire (CBE) in the 2024 New Year Honours for services to heritage, sport and charity.

In 2025 Richmond launched the Goodwood Art Foundation.

== Marriages and children ==
The Duke has been married twice and has three sons and two daughters. He married Sally Clayton in 1976, with whom he had one daughter:

- Lady Alexandra Gordon-Lennox (born 1985), married in 2013 to Sean Thomas Brennan. They later divorced.

Divorced from his first wife in 1989, on 30 November 1991 Lord March married the Hon. Janet Elizabeth Astor (born 1 December 1961), daughter of William Astor, 3rd Viscount Astor, with whom he has one daughter and three sons:

- Charles Henry Gordon-Lennox, Earl of March and Kinrara (born 20 December 1994), heir apparent to the family titles.
- Lord William Rupert Charles Gordon-Lennox (born 29 November 1996)
- Lady Eloise Cordelia Sky Gordon-Lennox (born 10 March 2000)
- Lord Frederick Lysander Charles Gordon-Lennox (born 10 March 2000)

In January 2016, the Duke and Duchess (then Earl and Countess of March) were attacked and tied up in a major jewel robbery at Goodwood House.

== Titles and styles ==
- 8 January 1955 – 2 November 1989: Lord Settrington
- 2 November 1989 – 1 September 2017: Earl of March and Kinrara
- 1 September 2017 – present: His Grace The Duke of Richmond, Lennox and Gordon

== Arms ==
Coat of arms of Charles Gordon-Lennox, 11th Duke of Richmond
Coronet That of a British Duke Crest 1st, a Bull's Head erased Sable horned Or; 2nd, on a Chapeau Gules turned up Ermine a Lion statant guardant Or crowned with a Ducal Coronet Gules and gorged with a Collar compony of four pieces Argent charged with eight Roses Gules and the Last; 3rd, out of a Ducal Coronet a Stag's Head affrontée Proper attired with ten Tynes Or Escutcheon Quarterly: 1st and 4th grand quarters, the Royal Arms of Charles II (viz. quarterly: 1st and 4th, France and England quarterly; 2nd, Scotland; 3rd, Ireland); the whole within a Bordure compony Argent charged with Roses Gules barbed and seeded Proper and the Last; overall an Inescutcheon Gules charged with three Buckles Or (Aubigny); 2nd grand quarter, Argent a Saltire engrailed Gules between four Roses of the Second barbed and seeded Proper (Lennox); 3rd grand quarter, quarterly, 1st, Azure three Boars' Heads couped Or (Gordon); 2nd, Or three Lions' Heads erased Gules (Badenoch); 3rd, Or three Crescents within a Double Tressure flory counter-flory Gules (Seton); 4th, Azure three Cinquefoils Argent (Fraser) Supporters Dexter: a Unicorn Argent armed, crined and unguled Or; Sinister: an Antelope Argent, also armed, crined and unguled Or, each Supporter gorged with a Collar compony as the Crest Motto Over the 1st Crest, Avant Darnlie; over the 2nd Crest, En La Rose Je Fleuris; and over the 3rd Crest, Bydand Orders The Circlet of the Order of the British Empire

Peerage of England
Preceded by Charles Gordon Lennox	Duke of Richmond; 4th creation 2017–present	Incumbent
Peerage of Scotland
Preceded by Charles Gordon Lennox	Duke of Lennox; 2nd creation 2017–present	Incumbent
Peerage of the United Kingdom
Preceded by Charles Gordon Lennox	Duke of Gordon; 2nd creation 2017–present	Incumbent
French nobility
Preceded by Charles Gordon Lennox	Duke of Aubigny; 2017–present	Incumbent
Orders of precedence in the United Kingdom
Preceded by The Duke of Somerset	Gentlemen; The Duke of Richmond	Succeeded by The Duke of Grafton
