= RAF Westhampnett =

Former Royal Air Force station in West Sussex, England (1940–1946)

RAF Westhampnett ~~USAAF Station AAF-352~~
- Westhampnett, West Sussex in England
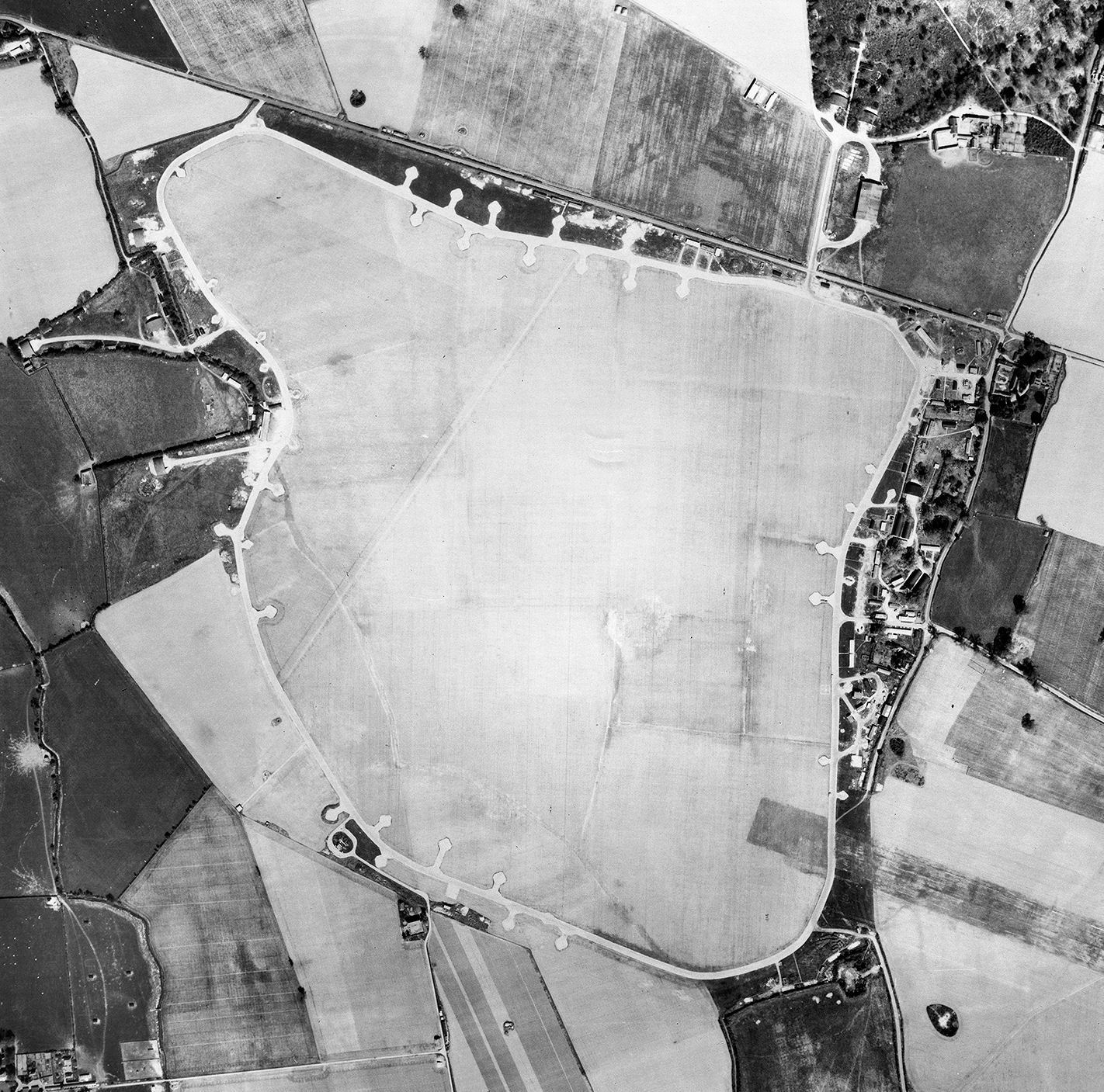
- Aerial photograph of RAF Westhampnet, 19 April 1946; the base's buildings are to the right

Site information
- Type: Royal Air Force station
- Code: WQ
- Owner: Air Ministry
- Operator: Royal Air Force; United States Army Air Forces 1942
- Controlled by: RAF Fighter Command * No. 11 Group RAF; 1938-42 & 1942-45; RAF Second Tactical Air Force * No. 83 Group RAF

Location
- Shown within West Sussex
- Coordinates: 50°51′40″N 000°45′33″W

Site history
- Built: 1938 & 1940
- In use: July 1940 – 1946
- Battles/wars: European theatre of World War II

Airfield information
- Elevation: 33 metres (108 ft) AMSL
Runways
Direction	Length and surface
06/24	855 metres (2,805 ft) Grass
10/28	613 metres (2,011 ft) Grass
14/32	1,300 metres (4,265 ft) Grass
- Sources: UK AIP at NATS

Royal Air Force Westhampnett or more simply RAF Westhampnett is a former Royal Air Force satellite station, located in the village of Westhampnett near Chichester, in the English county of West Sussex.

It was built as an emergency landing airfield for fighter aircraft, as a satellite station to RAF Tangmere. Built on land belonging to the Goodwood Estate, the then landowner, the Duke of Richmond, Frederick Gordon-Lennox retained the Title Deed to the land.

The airfield is now the civilian Chichester/Goodwood Airfield.

== History ==
=== Royal Air Force use ===
==== Squadrons ====
- No. 41 Squadron RAF., from RAF Merston 16 December 1941, to RAF Merston 1 April 1942; operating Supermarine Spitfire Vb
- No. 43 (China-British) Squadron RAF
- No. 65 (East India) Squadron RAF (1941)
- No. 91 (Nigeria) Squadron RAF (1943)
- No. 118 Squadron RAF (1943 & 1944)
- No. 124 (Baroda) Squadron RAF (1942 & 1944)
- No. 129 (Mysore) Squadron RAF (1941 & 1942)
- No. 130 (Punjab) Squadron RAF (1944)
- No. 131 (County of Kent) Squadron RAF (1942-43)
- No. 145 Squadron RAF - operating Hawker Hurricane. (1940)
- No. 167 (Gold Coast) Squadron RAF (1943)
- No. 174 (Mauritius) Squadron RAF (1943-44)
- No. 175 Squadron RAF (1944)
- No. 184 Squadron RAF (1944)
- No. 245 (Northern Rhodesian) Squadron RAF (1943-44)
- No. 302 Polish Fighter Squadron (1940-41)
- No. 303 Squadron RAF (1944)
- No. 340 (GC IV/2 Île-de-France) Squadron RAF (1942)
- No. 350 (Belgian) Squadron (1944)
- No. 402 Squadron RCAF (1944)
- No. 416 Squadron RCAF (1942)
- No. 441 Squadron RCAF (1944)
- No. 442 Squadron RCAF (1944)
- No. 443 Squadron RCAF (1944)
- No. 485 (NZ) Squadron RAF (1943)
- No. 501 (County of Gloucester) Squadron AAF (1943 & 1944)
- No. 602 (City of Glasgow) Squadron AAF - operating Supermarine Spitfire (1940)
- No. 610 (County of Chester) Squadron AAF - operating Supermarine Spitfire (1941, 1943 & 1944)
- No. 614 (County of Glamorgan) Squadron AAF
- No. 616 (South Yorkshire) Squadron AAF
- 787 Naval Air Squadron.

==== Units ====
- No. 83 Group Support Unit during November 1944
- No. 121 Airfield Headquarters RAF between October 1943 and April 1944
- No. 144 (RCAF) Airfield Headquarters RAF during April 1944
- No. 402 Air Stores Park between October 1943 and January 1944
- Detachment of No. 1493 (Fighter) Gunnery Flight between June and July 1943
- Air Sea Rescue Flight RAF, Merston/Westhampnett during November 1941
- No. 1307 Mobile Wing RAF Regiment
- No. 2703 Squadron RAF Regiment
- No. 2704 Squadron RAF Regiment
- No. 2709 Squadron RAF Regiment
- No. 2713 Squadron RAF Regiment
- No. 2742 Squadron RAF Regiment
- No. 2761 Squadron RAF Regiment
- No. 2766 Squadron RAF Regiment
- No. 2778 Squadron RAF Regiment
- No. 2793 Squadron RAF Regiment
- No. 2795 Squadron RAF Regiment
- No. 4001 Anti-Aircraft Flight RAF Regiment
- No. 4067 Anti-Aircraft Flight RAF Regiment

=== United States Army Air Forces ===
- 31st Fighter Group between 1 August 1942 and 8 November 1942.

== Current use ==
Upon its closure by the RAF, Westhampnett airfield subsequently became Chichester/Goodwood Airfield and its perimeter track became the basis of the Goodwood Motor Racing Circuit.

== See also ==
- List of former Royal Air Force stations
- Goodwood Circuit
