= Hugh Wyatt =

Hugh Rowland Wyatt, CVO (born 18 November 1933) was the Lord Lieutenant of West Sussex from 1999 to 2008. He succeeded the late Major General Sir Philip Ward. He also served as High Sheriff of West Sussex from 1995 to 1996.

== Career ==
Wyatt was educated at Winchester College. He served in the Royal Sussex Regiment from 1952 to 1954 before going on to the London School of Printing. He is now a retired businessman, having been a Director of McCorquodale Plc, the printers, until 1985, and farms at Cissbury, Findon.

Wyatt was heavily involved in Sussex affairs, for example as Chairman of the Chichester Cathedral Council, Patron of the Chichester Cathedral Restoration & Development Trust and Pallant House, and as Patron or President of many other Sussex Charities and Trusts. He is the President of the Royal Sussex Regimental Association. He was High Sheriff of West Sussex 1995/96, and served as Lord Lieutenant of West Sussex from July 1999 until 2008.

He was awarded an honorary Fellowship by the University of Chichester in 2008.

Wyatt was appointed Commander of the Royal Victorian Order (CVO) in the 2009 New Year Honours.

== Positions and patronages ==
- Chairman, Advisory Committee on Justices of the Peace
- Chairman, Advisory Committee on the General Commissioners of Income Tax
- Chairman of Chichester Cathedral Council
- Vice President, Chichester Cathedral Millennium Endowment Trust
- Patron, Chichester Cathedral Restoration & Development Trust
- Patron, Chichester Christian Care Association
- Patron, Friends of St Nicholas Building Trust
- Patron, The Lodge Hill Trust
- Appeal President, NSPCC - Sussex Full Stop Appeal
- Joint President, The Order of St John
- Patron, Pallant House, Chichester
- President, The Royal Sussex Regimental Association
- Appeal Patron, Royal West Sussex NHS Trust
- Joint President, SABC Clubs for Young People (Sussex)
- Vice President, South East Reserve Forces & Cadets Association (RFCA)
- Appeal President, Sussex Housing & Care
- Vice President, Sussex Rural Community Council
- Vice Patron, West Sussex Association for the Blind (4 Sight)
- Vice President, West Sussex Federation of Young Farmers' Clubs
- Joint President, The Sussex Historical Churches Trust

Honorary titles
Preceded by P Longley	High Sheriff of West Sussex; 1995 – 1996	Succeeded by J Knight
Preceded by Philip Ward	Lord Lieutenant of West Sussex; 1999 – 2008	Succeeded by Susan Pyper
