= Philip Ward =

British Army general (1924–2003)

Major-General Sir Philip Ward KCVO CBE
- Born: 10 July 1924; Caterham, Surrey, England
- Died: 6 January 2003 (aged 78)
- Military career
- Allegiance: United Kingdom
- Branch: British Army
- Service years: 1943–1979
- Rank: Major-General
- Service number: 293484
- Unit: Welsh Guards
- Commands: London District; Household Division; Royal Military Academy Sandhurst
- Conflicts: Second World War; Operation Banner
- Awards: Knight Commander of the Royal Victorian Order; Commander of the Order of the British Empire

Major-General Sir Philip John Newling Ward, KCVO, CBE (10 July 1924 – 6 January 2003) was a senior British Army officer who, as Commander Land Forces, Gulf, oversaw Britain's withdrawal from the Persian Gulf in the 1970s. Ward served as high sheriff of West Sussex (1985–86), and a deputy lieutenant from 1981. Thereafter, he was Lord-Lieutenant of West Sussex (1994–99), having been Vice Lord-Lieutenant of the county from 1990 to 1994.

== Early life ==
Philip Ward was the son of G. W. N. Ward and was educated at Monkton Combe School near Bath. He was commissioned into the Welsh Guards in 1943 and served with the 2nd Battalion in the armoured reconnaissance role, equipped with Cromwell tanks, during the campaign in North West Europe in the Guards Armoured Division. This included Operation Goodwood – the start of the breakout from the eastern end of the Normandy Bridgehead – the subsequent fighting in the countryside of the bocage and the armoured dash to Brussels. It is believed that it was one of the 2nd Welsh Guards' Cromwell tanks that was the first to enter Brussels on 3 September 1944, before going on to Nijmegen. The battalion suffered many casualties during the early months of the campaign.

== Post-war and Gulf diplomacy ==
Much of Ward's service after the Second World War was concerned with the exacting demands of military ceremonial at the unit and, later, at the state level. He was adjutant of the Eaton Hall Infantry Officer Cadet School, 1950–52, and of the Royal Military Academy Sandhurst, 1960–62, before being appointed Brigade Major of the Household Division and London District in 1962. In the latter assignment, he was responsible for orchestrating all ceremonial events in which the Household Cavalry and Foot Guards were involved, from the annual Trooping the Colour on the official birthday of the Queen down to the almost weekly guards of honour for visiting foreign dignitaries.

After commanding the 1st Welsh Guards in Aden and the Western Protectorate, Ward found a job in the Ministry of Defence tedious and was thinking of leaving the army when he was appointed Commander Land Forces, Gulf, as a brigadier, in 1969. By then the Aden base had been abandoned and the British Headquarters in the Middle East shifted to Bahrain. The abandonment of Aden and the Protectorate sheikhs caused the Gulf State rulers to look to their own guarantees from Britain and – especially those newly rich with oil – to greater independence in their foreign affairs. In January 1968 a British Government emissary informed the Gulf Rulers that, far from remaining indefinitely, the British military presence was to be withdrawn by the end of 1971 as part of the ending of commitments east of Suez. Although some alarm was expressed by the smaller and financially weaker states, the British declaration drew the states closer together and Ward was able to close down his command in an atmosphere of continuing friendship and co-operation.

Ward was appointed a Commander of the Order of the British Empire for his services in the Gulf and took over as Major-General commanding the Household Division and General Officer Commanding London District in October 1973. Ward knew the ceremonial aspects down to the last detail and enjoyed this period of his career. In 1974 his home was badly damaged by a Provisional IRA bomb. He was appointed a Knight Commander of the Royal Victorian Order at the end of his tour of command and moved to Camberley to become the Commandant of the Royal Military Academy Sandhurst in 1976.

== Later life and positions ==
On leaving the army in 1979, Ward became a Communar of Chichester Cathedral (1980–83), and a director of a wide range of companies. He was director of public affairs at International Distillers & Vintners, chairman of Peter Hamilton from 1986 to 1990, and a director of W&A Gilbey Security Consultants from 1983 to 1989. The funds of another company of which he was a director began to diminish in unexplained circumstances. Lunching with a fellow director after a board meeting he inquired whether he thought they might be sent to prison. Not reassured by his companion's reply, he remarked: "Well if we are, I shall ask the judge to send us to Ford Open Prison where I believe there is an excellent library."

Ward was high sheriff of West Sussex (1985–86), and a deputy lieutenant from 1981. Thereafter he was lord-lieutenant of West Sussex (1994–99), having been vice lord-lieutenant of the county from 1990 to 1994. Ward was president of the South of England Agricultural Society (1994–95), Governor of the Church Lads' and Church Girls' Brigade (1979–86), and Patron of the Chichester Cathedral Trust in 1995. Ward was president of the D-Day and Normandy Fellowship from 1990 to 2001. In 1993, he laid the foundation stone for new site of Tanbridge House School in Horsham.

== Personal life ==
Ward married Pamela Ann Glennie in 1948. She survived him with their two sons and two daughters.

Military offices
| Preceded by Sir James Bowes-Lyon | GOC London District; 1973–1976 | Succeeded by Sir John Swinton |
| Preceded by Robert Ford | Commandant of the Royal Military Academy Sandhurst; 1976–1979 | Succeeded by Richard Vickers |
Honorary titles
| Preceded by John Cowley | High Sheriff of West Sussex; 1985–1986 | Succeeded by J F Godman-Dorington |
| Preceded by The Duke of Richmond and Gordon | Lord Lieutenant of West Sussex; 1994–1999 | Succeeded by Hugh Wyatt |
