= Goodwoof =

Dog event in England

- Venue: Goodwood Estate
- Locations: Kennel Hill, Goodwood, Chichester PO18 0PN
- Country: United Kingdom
- Sponsors: Mars Petcare
- Website: www.goodwood.com/goodwoof/

Goodwoof is an annual celebration of dogs, held on the Goodwood Estate in the United Kingdom. The event features a variety of activities for both dogs and their owners.

== History ==
The Goodwood Estate has maintained a longstanding connection with dogs since 1697, when Charles Lennox, 1st Duke of Richmond acquired a property on the estate to engage in the nearby Charlton Hunt. In 1787, the third Duke of Richmond enlisted architect James Wyatt to construct kennels renowned for their opulence. The third Duke held a deep affection for his hounds and allocated considerable resources and attention to their care. Notably, the kennels were equipped with central heating even before it was installed in Goodwood House.

== Event ==
Goodwoof is held at The Kennels on the Goodwood Estate. The estate's kennels, once renowned for their luxury, are now a private clubhouse for Goodwood members.

The Goodwoof event, held over two days, is intended to celebrate dogs and dog-related activities. The event schedule encompasses a selection of competitions, workshops, wellness activities and play. The event also features an open-air cinema and a Fastest Dog 50-meter dash. The event also recognises bonds between dogs and their owners through the Chien Charmant competition. Each year a chosen breed picked to be the focus point of celebrations over the course of the event with the breed of 2023 being Poodles.

The Barkitecture competition is an annual two-day exhibition. The contest challenges architects and designers to develop innovative kennel designs. The 2022 edition of the competition featured 16 shortlisted kennels, which were later auctioned off, with the proceeds donated to the Dogs Trust.

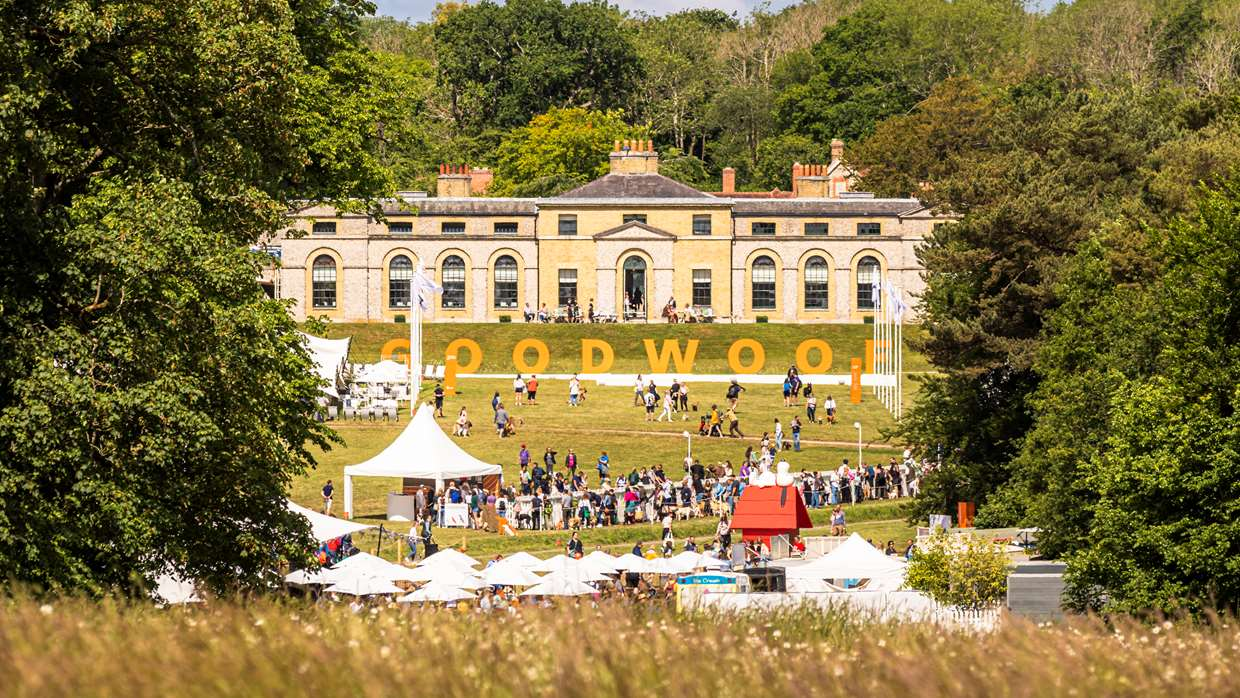

== Reception ==
The first Goodwoof event was covered by the national press and lifestyle publications, such as The Sunday Times, The Daily Mail, and The Telegraph. The event was also aired on ITV for two hours. The Goodwoof community is increasing in size with the introduction of new elements and digital content each year. The Goodwood Estate hosted over 12,000 attendees for the inaugural Goodwoof weekend. Prominent figure James Middleton was in attendance.
