= Goodwood (Richmond, Massachusetts) =

- U.S. National Register of Historic Places
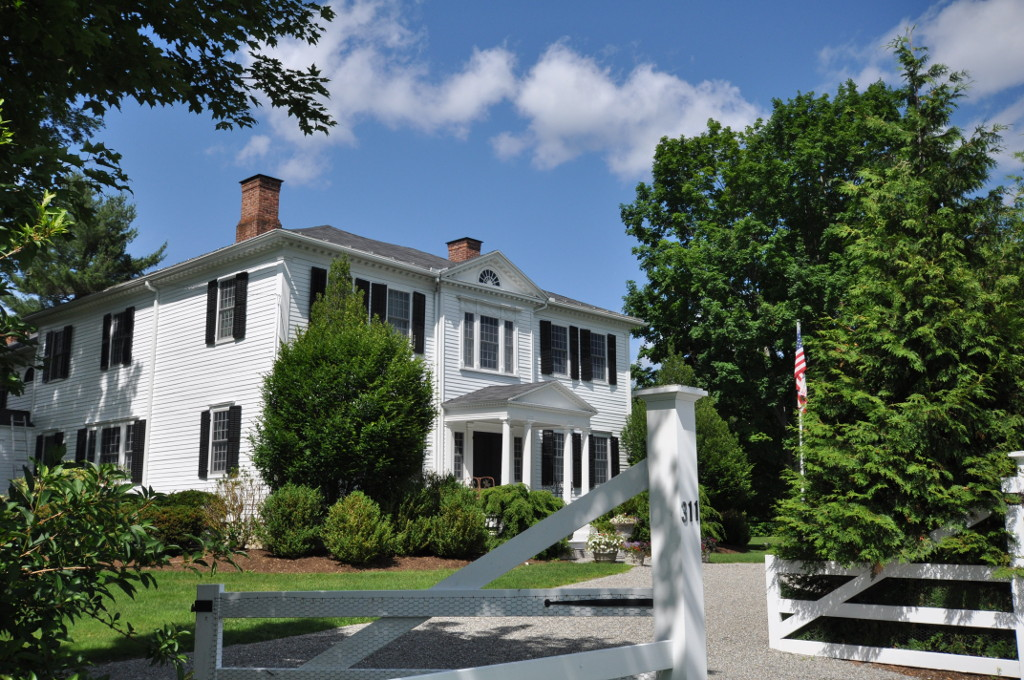

- Location within Massachusetts Location within the United States
- Location: 311 Summit Road, Richmond, Massachusetts
- Coordinates: 42°23′49″N 73°21′22″W
- Built: 1792
- Architectural style: Georgian, Federal
- NRHP reference No.: 82004955
- Added to NRHP: April 15, 1982

Goodwood is a historic house in Richmond, Massachusetts. Built c. 1792, the house is one of the best examples of late-Georgian early-Federalist houses in Berkshire County, Massachusetts. The property's importance is further enhanced by its association with a number of high-profile owners.

== History ==
The first significant owner of the Goodwood property in Richmond, Massachusetts was one Jeremiah Pierson, who acquired the property in 1792, and sold it, with a house and outbuildings on it, five years later. In 1820, it came into the hands of Reverend Edwin Welles Dwight, a distant relative of Yale College president Timothy Dwight. Dwight was—for eighteen years—minister at the local Congregational Church, and was also notable in the foreign missionary movement, writing an account of a South Sea islander named Henry Obookiah. Dwight's memoir of Obookiah's life sparked the first missionary expedition to the Sandwich Islands (now Hawaii).

In 1838, Dwight sold the property to geologist Stephen Reed. He gained international exposure for his descriptions of the Richmond Boulder Train, a series of glacial erratics in Richmond and neighboring New York State. His accounts and presentations sparked a long-running debate in the geological community on the subject of glaciation. Reed sold the property in 1850, and it went through a success of owners. The purchaser in 1896, Mrs. Henry March, gave the property the name "Goodwood", after Goodwood House, the seat of the Dukes of Richmond. Richmond was named for the third duke, who supported American independence in the late 18th century.

In 1933, Goodwood was purchased by Raymond Leslie Buell, an influential diplomat, and one-time editor of Fortune magazine. In 1982, the house was owned by a descendant of both Buell and Reverend Dwight. The property was listed on the National Register of Historic Places in 1982.

== Description ==
Goodwood is a four-square two-storey wood-frame house that incorporates both late Georgian and early Federalist features. The main feature of the front is the entry porch, featuring sidelights, Palladian windows, and a semi-circular gable window. The interior of the house is well preserved, consisting of a central hall plan with two interior chimneys. The original kitchen, the room to the back and right of the hall, retains its original cooking fireplace, but has been converted to a library, housing Dr. Buell's 2,000-volume collection. The two front drawing rooms are both elaborately decorated.

== See also ==
- National Register of Historic Places listings in Berkshire County, Massachusetts
