= Charles Torquil de Montalt Fraser =

High Sheriff of West Sussex

Charles Torquil de Montalt Fraser (born 2 October 1960) was High Sheriff of West Sussex in 2006–07.

== Biography ==
Fraser, the son of Major Michael Quintin Fraser, was educated at Temple Grove School, Rugby School and the Royal Military Academy Sandhurst. On graduation from Sandhurst in 1980 he was commissioned into the Life Guards as a second lieutenant. He saw operational duty in Northern Ireland in 1982, and was promoted to lieutenant. He left the army in 1986.

Since 1995 he has been heavily involved in the administration of polo in Great Britain. He was a steward of the Governing Body of Hurlingham Polo Club from 1995 to 2006. He has served on various committees within the sport, being chairman of the handicap committee and chairman of the development committee, overseeing the entire programme of youth polo in Great Britain, including Young England National Team SUPA. He still serves on the disciplinary committee and is on the council. He was chairman of the Cowdray Park Polo Club from 1997 to 2001.

=== Family background ===
Fraser comes from a multi-generational polo-playing family with ties to British India. His father Major Michael Quintin Fraser of Nashes Farm, Penshurst, Kent, England was once an adviser to the Sultan of Oman in the 1970s.

He was married in July 1988 to the former Hon. Lucy Pearson (b. 11 April 1954), third daughter of the 3rd Viscount Cowdray (1910–1995), and his eldest child and elder daughter by his second wife Elizabeth Georgiana Mather-Jackson, daughter of Sir Anthony Henry Mather Mather-Jackson, 6th Baronet. Lucy was the wife of polo player Luis Hector Juan Sosa Basualdo between 1974 and 1980, and had two children by her first marriage, who subsequently took the name Pearson. Charles and Lucy Fraser had four daughters together. They bought Blackdown Park, near Petworth, West Sussex, in 1996.

He has been involved in many Sussex organisations including:

- Governor, Midhurst Grammar School
- Chairman of the Governors, Conifers School
- Chairman, Lurgashall Cricket Club
- Trustee, Arundel Castle Trust
- Instructor, Duke of Edinburgh Award
- Vice President, Cowdray Park Polo Club
- Sussex Wildlife Trust
- The Chiddingfold, Leconfield and Cowdray Hunt
- Winstons Wish Charity
