= Charles Gordon-Lennox, 10th Duke of Richmond =

British peer and landowner (1929–2017)

His Grace The Duke of Richmond
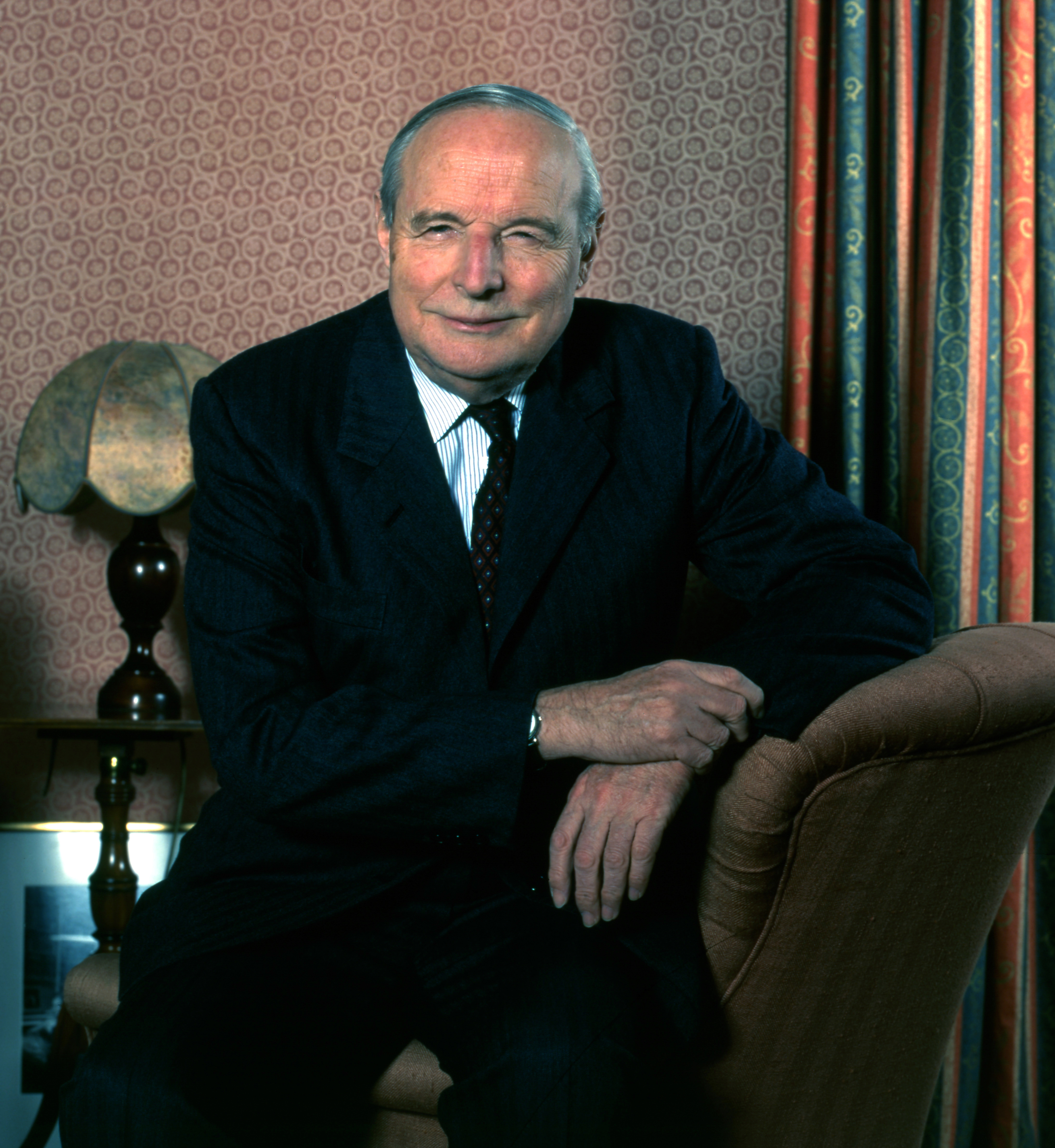
- Portrait by Allan Warren, 1990

Lord Lieutenant of West Sussex
- In office 23 March 1990 – 29 March 1994
- Monarch: Elizabeth II
- Preceded by: The Duchess of Norfolk
- Succeeded by: Sir Phillip Ward

Member of the House of Lords
- Lord Temporal
- Hereditary peer 2 November 1989 – 11 November 1999
- Preceded by: Frederick, 9th Duke of Richmond
- Succeeded by: Seat abolished

Personal details
- Born: 19 September 1929
- Died: 1 September 2017 (aged 87)
- Spouse: Susan Grenville-Grey (m. 1951)
- Children: 5, including: Charles Gordon-Lennox, 11th Duke of Richmond; Lady Naomi Gordon-Lennox
- Parents: Frederick Gordon-Lennox, 9th Duke of Richmond (father); Elizabeth Hudson (mother)

Charles Henry Gordon-Lennox, 10th Duke of Richmond, 10th Duke of Lennox, 10th Duke of Aubigny, 5th Duke of Gordon (19 September 1929 – 1 September 2017), styled Lord Settrington until 1935 and Earl of March and Kinrara between 1935 and 1989, was a British peer and landowner.

The son of Frederick Gordon-Lennox, 9th Duke of Richmond, he succeeded to the titles when his father died in 1989. The seat of the Dukes of Richmond is Goodwood House in Sussex. The 10th Duke moved to the smaller Molecomb House nearby when his son Lord March took over control of the estate and moved into the main house with his family.

== Career ==
The Duke was educated at Eton College and William Temple College, a now-defunct Church of England theological college (see William Temple Foundation). He was a 2nd Lieutenant in the 60th Rifles from 1949 to 1950. He was a Chartered Accountant and spent nearly two decades working in the corporate world.

He held a number of civic, business and church appointments, including Chancellor of the University of Sussex from 1985 to 1998, and Church Commissioner from 1963 to 1976; member of the General Synod of the Church of England from 1960 to 1980 and on committees of the World Council of Churches. He was a Deputy Lieutenant of West Sussex from 1975 until 1990, and Lord Lieutenant from 1990 to 1994. He was also a patron of Prisoners Abroad, a charity supporting the welfare of Britons imprisoned overseas and their families.

In 2006, he founded Sussex Community Foundation in response to severe social deprivation that he had observed throughout Sussex. In his own words:

It is, in my view, a scandal that there are areas in Sussex which are in the bottom 20% of national measures of social deprivation. At the same time, when local people or companies think of giving to charity they tend to think of large national bodies, because little is known about the small community groups on their doorsteps.

== Family ==
The then Earl of March married in 1951 Susan Monica Grenville-Grey (1932–2023), daughter of Colonel Cecil Everard Montague Grenville-Grey and Louise Monica (née Morrison-Bell). They had three children:

- Lady Ellinor Caroline Gordon-Lennox (28 July 1952 – 24 January 2025)
- Charles Gordon-Lennox, 11th Duke of Richmond (born 8 January 1955). He married Sally Clayton on 3 July 1976 and was divorced in 1989. They have one daughter. He remarried Hon. Janet Elizabeth Astor (daughter of William Waldorf Astor, 3rd Viscount Astor) in 1991. They have four children.
- Lady Louisa Elizabeth Gordon-Lennox (born 14 March 1967). She married Benjamin "Ben" Collings on 1 November 1997. They have four children.

The Duke and Duchess, then Earl and Countess of March, attracted press attention when they adopted two girls of mixed race during a time of anti-immigrant sentiment and when interracial marriage was frowned upon:

- Lady Maria Gordon-Lennox (born 1959). She married Paul Collins in 1986 and was divorced in 1988. She remarried Christopher Handy in 1989, divorced in 2001, and they have one daughter.
- Lady Naomi Gordon-Lennox (born 1962). She married Gavin Burke in 1999 and they were divorced. They have three children.

Both girls were born in England to white mothers, with a Ghanaian and a black South African father, respectively. Adopted children of peers were not allowed to use styles, titles and courtesy titles until a Royal Warrant issued in April 2004 meant that Maria and Naomi were elevated as Ladies, as daughters of a duke of the realm.

== Arms ==
Coat of arms of Charles Gordon-Lennox, 10th Duke of Richmond
Coronet A coronet of a Duke Crest 1st, a Bull's Head erased Sable horned Or; 2nd, on a Chapeau Gules turned up Ermine a Lion statant guardant Or crowned with a Ducal Coronet Gules and gorged with a Collar compony of four pieces Argent charged with eight Roses Gules and the last; 3rd, out of a Ducal Coronet a Stag's Head affrontée proper attired with ten Tynes Or Escutcheon Quarterly: 1st and 4th grand quarters, the Royal Arms of Charles II (viz. quarterly: 1st and 4th, France and England quarterly; 2nd, Scotland; 3rd, Ireland); the whole within a Bordure compony Argent charged with Roses Gules barbed and seeded proper and the last; overall an Escutcheon Gules charged with three Buckles Or (the Dukedom of Aubigny); 2nd grand quarter, Argent a Saltire engrailed Gules between four Roses of the second barbed and seeded proper (Lennox); 3rd grand quarter, quarterly, 1st, Azure three Boars' Heads couped Or (Gordon); 2nd, Or three Lions' Heads erased Gules (Badenoch); 3rd, Or three Crescents within a Double Tressure flory counter-flory Gules (Seton); 4th, Azure three Cinquefoils Argent (Fraser) Supporters Dexter: a Unicorn Argent armed, crined and unguled Or; Sinister: an Antelope Argent, also armed, crined and unguled Or, each supporter gorged with a Collar compony as the crest Motto Over the 1st crest, Avant Darnlie; over the 2nd crest, En La Rose Je Fleuris; and over the 3rd crest, Bydand

Honorary titles
Preceded by The Duchess of Norfolk	Lord Lieutenant of West Sussex; 1990–1994	Succeeded by Sir Philip Ward
Peerage of England
Preceded by Frederick Gordon-Lennox	Duke of Richmond; 3rd creation 1989–2017	Succeeded by Charles Gordon-Lennox
Peerage of Scotland
Preceded by Frederick Gordon-Lennox	Duke of Lennox; 2nd creation 1989–2017	Succeeded by Charles Gordon-Lennox
Peerage of the United Kingdom
Preceded by Frederick Gordon-Lennox	Duke of Gordon; 2nd creation 1989–2017	Succeeded by Charles Gordon-Lennox
French nobility
Preceded by Frederick Gordon-Lennox	Duke of Aubigny; 1989–2017	Succeeded by Charles Gordon-Lennox
