= Richard Sackville (by 1501 – 1545 or 1546) =

English politician

Richard Sackville (by 1501 – 1545 or 1546) was an English politician.

== Career ==
Sackville was born in or before 1501. His family had lands in Essex. By 1529 he was a lawyer, qualifying through Gray's Inn. Among his posts were estate management, the stewardship of lands and estates connected with Arundel Castle though his association with the Earls of Arundel, and the Sussex bench. He was a Member of Parliament (MP) for Arundel in 1529, which may not have been his first or last such election.

== Personal life ==
Richard Sackville was the second son of a former Richard Sackville. He married Agnes, daughter of Thomas Thatcher of Westhampnett, and they had one child, Elizabeth, who married Henry Shelley of Warminghurst. Sackville died intestate. Through his brother John he was related to the Boleyn family. He lived in Westhampnett.
