= Westhampnett =

Village and parish in West Sussex, England

Coordinates: 50°50′56″N 0°44′49″W

- Village
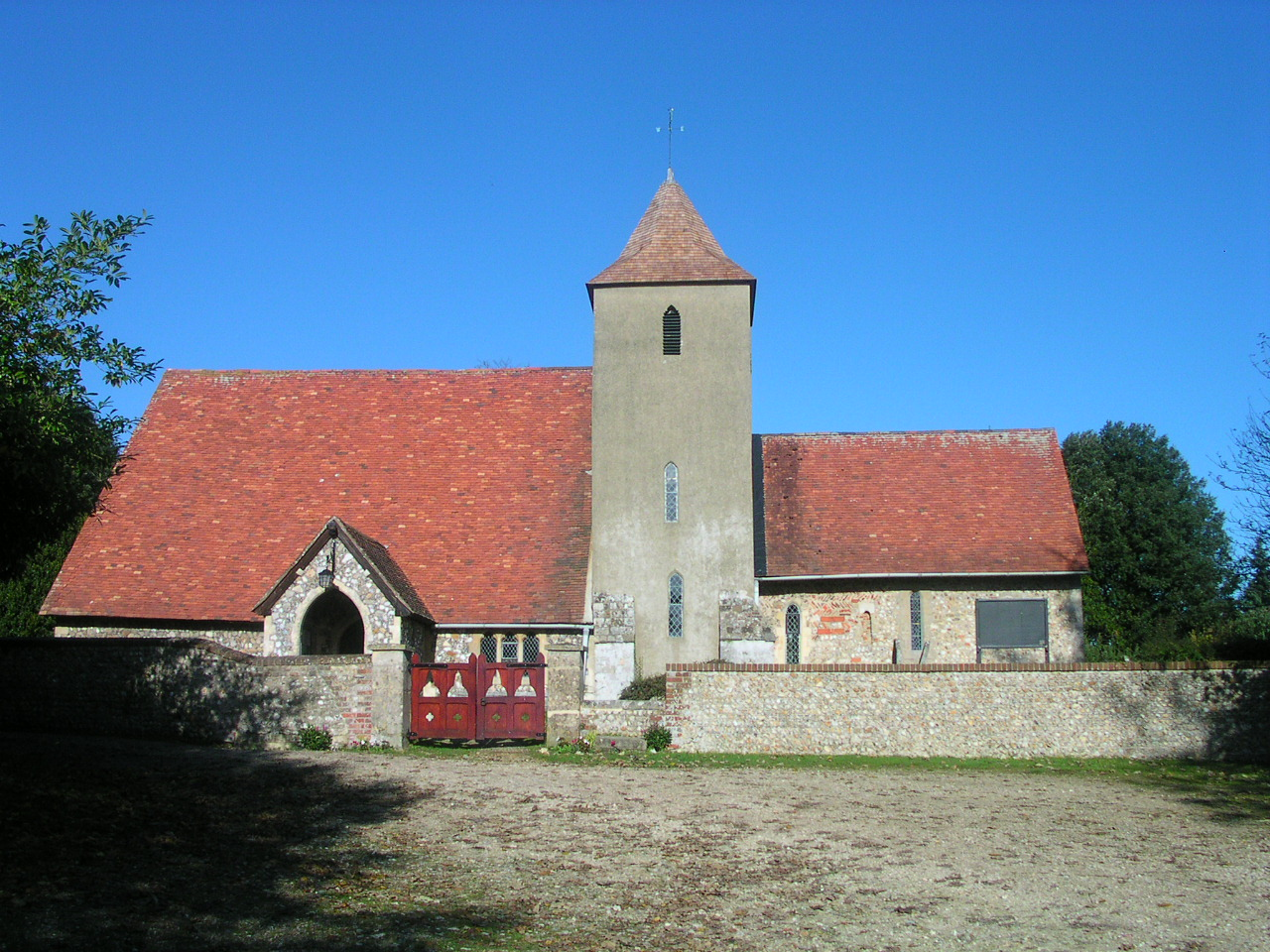
- Church of St Peter

- Location within West Sussex
- Area: 8.89 km^{2} (3.43 sq mi)
- Population: 709 (2011 Census)
  - Density: 52/km^{2} (130/sq mi)
- OS grid reference: SU883062
  - London: 53 miles (85 km) NNE
- Civil parish: Westhampnett
- District: Chichester
- Shire county: West Sussex
- Region: South East
- Country: England
- Sovereign state: United Kingdom
- Post town: CHICHESTER
- Postcode district: PO18
- Dialling code: 01243
- Police: Sussex
- Fire: West Sussex
- Ambulance: South East Coast
- UK Parliament: Chichester

Westhampnett (or West Hampnett) is a village, Anglican parish and civil parish in the district of Chichester in West Sussex, England, located 1 mile (1.6 km) northeast of Chichester on the former A27 road, now by-passed. The village is pre-Norman and is home to many listed buildings, including the Saxon church of St Peter, where three bishops of Chichester are buried. The parish of Westhampnett includes most of Goodwood estate, its golf courses, cricket club, motor-racing circuit and airfield.

== Etymology ==
The name Westhampnett is first attested in the Domesday Book of 1086 as Hentone. This name derives from the Old English words hēah ('high') and tūn ('estate, farmstead'), and thus meant 'high farmstead'. The name is first attested with the addition of the Old English word west and Anglo-Norman diminutive suffix -et in 1279, as Westhamptonette.

== History ==
Westhampnett was a Saxon settlement which like most passed into the hands of new overlords the Normans on the Norman Conquest. The present village is a scattering of houses around an Anglican parish church of Saxon origin, dedicated to St Peter.

Westhampnett was listed in the Domesday Book (1086) in the ancient hundred of Boxgrove as having 16 cottager households, woodland, land for pigs, a mill (valued at 5 shillings) and a church, all with a value to the lord of the manor of £3.

St James's Hospital was established in the reign of Henry I (1068–1135) in Westhampnett for people affected by leprosy. A fire in 1781 destroyed it, and a cottage, now called Leper's Cottage, a Grade II listed building, was built on the site in the 18th century.

Westhampnett Poor Law Union was established in 1835, encompassing many surrounding parishes. Westhampnett's own workhouse was in existence until a fire destroyed it in 1899. The building had existed since the 16th century, and was leased to the Guardians of the Union by the Duke of Richmond. The house had been rebuilt by Sir Hutchins Williams in about 1720.

Two public houses existed in the parish: The Swan in the southwest, and the Coach and Horses at Maudlin on Stane Street; both closed in the 20th century, the former having been redeveloped. These, and a disused brickworks, are shown on an 1898 map.

== Civil parish ==
The civil parish includes the hamlets of Maudlin (on the Roman road Stane Street, now the A285) and Waterbeach to the northeast, and Westerton and Woodcote to the north. Maudlin derives its name from the former small hospital of St Mary Magdalen. To the north the parish extends just to Goodwood Racecourse high on the South Downs, including Goodwood House and most of Goodwood Airfield and motor racing circuit. The parish has a land area of 888.52 hectares (2,195.6 acres). In the 2001 census 460 people lived in 161 households, of whom 234 were economically active.

== Church ==
The parish church of St Peter, a Grade II* listed building, was a Saxon construction dating from before the Norman Conquest of 1066, and incorporates Roman bricks in the structure. The church is mentioned in the Domesday Book of 1086. It was enlarged in the 13th century and added to in later centuries, the Roman-brick chancel arch being replaced. The church has three bells: one undated, the others dated 1581 and 1632. The churchyard contains an unusually large number of elaborate headstones, including plain and Celtic crosses, indicating a wealthy congregation in past centuries.

== School ==
The March Church of England Primary School, in Claypit Lane, is next to the parish church.

== RAF Westhampnett ==
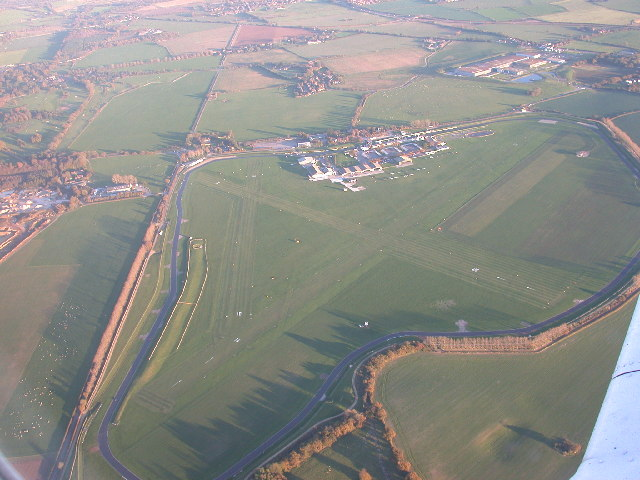
Goodwood Airfield in 2005

The airfield began as a World War II fighter base, opened in 1940 during the Battle of Britain when it was home to two Spitfire squadrons. It was later used by the United States Army Air Force fighter squadrons, flying British Spitfires and Typhoons.

== Goodwood ==
The Goodwood estate is the family seat of the Dukes of Richmond and occupies much of the parish of Westhampnett. A motor racing circuit was developed from the perimeter road of the former RAF airfield which is now, as Chichester/Goodwood Airfield, used for recreational flying and pilot training; the track hosts the annual Goodwood Revival race meeting. The Goodwood Festival of Speed was developed around a hill climb in the grounds of Goodwood House. Goodwood Racecourse is in the north of the estate.

== Notable places and people ==
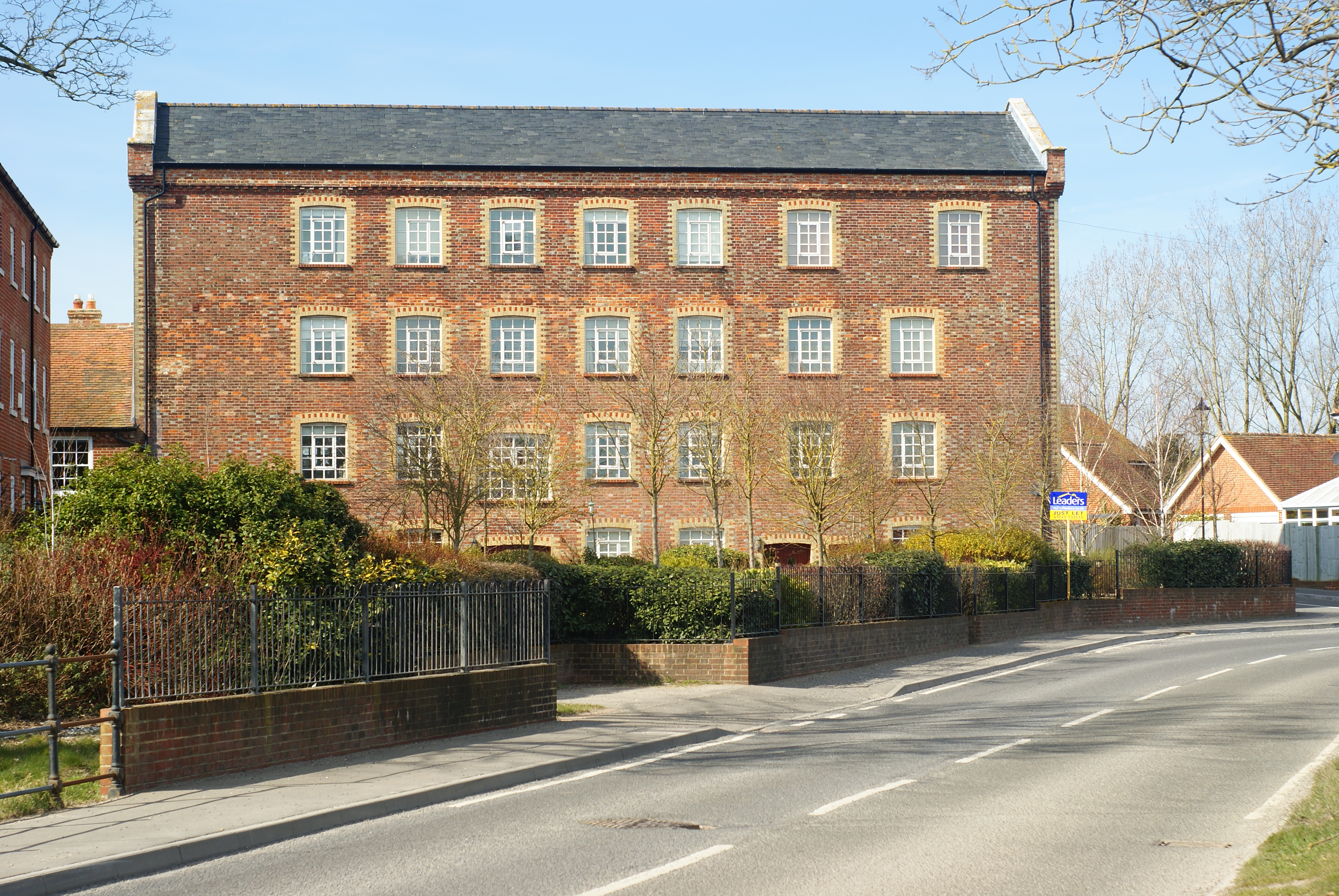
Westhampnett Mill in 2010

Between Westhampnett church and Maudlin is the Rolls-Royce Motor Cars assembly plant, producing and testing the finished cars. Just to the south of the church is Chichester District's main waste recycling centre. Towards Chichester is the former Westhampnett Mill, a watermill on the River Lavant, and a Grade-II listed building; it is constructed with red brick and is dated 1772. There are 46 other listed buildings in the parish, including three Grade I at Goodwood House.

Three consecutive Bishops of Chichester are buried at Westhampnett: Ashurst Gilbert (in office 1842–1870), Richard Durnford (1870–1895) and Ernest Wilberforce (1896–1907). In the church there is a monument to 16th century MP Richard Sackville.

England cricketer James Lillywhite (1842–1929) was born in the village and is buried at St Peter's. Lillywhite was a member of England's first Test team in the first ever Test match in 1877 against Australia and was the first captain of the England team.
