= High Sheriff of West Sussex =

Ceremonial officer of West Sussex, England

The High Sheriff of West Sussex is annually appointed as the sovereign's representative in West Sussex county for all matters relating to the judiciary and the maintenance of law and order.

== History of the office high sheriff ==
The oldest office under the crown, the office of High Sheriff is over 1000 years old, with its establishment before the Norman Conquest. The Office of High Sheriff remained first in precedence in the counties until the reign of Edward VII when an Order in Council in 1908 gave the Lord-Lieutenant the prime office under the Crown as the Sovereign's personal representative. The High Sheriff remains the sovereign's representative in the county for all matters relating to the judiciary and the maintenance of law and order. Prior to 1974, there was one High Sheriff for the whole of Sussex. The High Sheriff is appointed annually in March.

=== Roles and responsibilities ===
High Sheriffs are responsible in the Counties of England and Wales for duties conferred by the Crown through Warrant from the Privy Council, including:

- Attendance at Royal visits to the County
- The wellbeing and protection of Her Majesty's High Court Judges when on Circuit in the County and attending them in Court during the legal terms.
- The execution of High Court Writs and Orders (which is mainly achieved through the Under Sheriff)
- Acting as the Returning Officer for Parliamentary Elections in County constituencies
- Responsibility for the proclamation of the accession of a new Sovereign
- The maintenance of the loyalty of subjects to the Crown

=== High Sheriffs of West Sussex ===
- 1974-1975: Wing Commander Geoffrey Harry Briggs
- 1975-1976: Donald D Scott
- 1976-1977: David S W Blacker
- 1977-1978: Geoffrey M Cresswell-Wall
- 1978-1979: Peter M Luttman-Johnson
- 1979-1980: Henry Edward Boscawen
- 1980-1981: Leslie Langmead
- 1981-1982: David I Bosanquet
- 1982-1983: Peter Langmead
- 1983-1984: Edward John Frederick Green
- 1984-1985: Major General John Cain Cowley
- 1985-1986: Major General Sir Philip John Newling Ward
- 1986-1987: James Frederick Godman-Dorington
- 1987-1988: David Hugh Laing Hopkinson
- 1988-1989: Ronald Charles Langmead
- 1989-1990: John Richard Bine Morgan-Grenville, of Upperton, Petworth
- 1990-1991: David William Bowerman
- 1991-1992: Michael Desmond Sugden
- 1992-1993: Jeremy Fox Eric Smith
- 1993-1994: Richard Harry Goring
- 1994-1995: Peter Longley
- 1995-1996: Hugh Rowland Wyatt
- 1996-1997: John Martyn Drysdale Knight
- 1997-1998: Col Sir Brian Walter de Stopham Barttelot
- 1998-1999: Brian Sadler Leigh Trafford
- 1999-2000: Judith Buckland
- 2000-2001: Robert (Robin) Reginald Loder
- 2001-2002: Graham George Ferguson
- 2002-2003: Mark William Burrell
- 2003-2004: Major Mark Frederick Hakon Scrase-Dickins
- 2004-2005: Roger William Hampson Reed
- 2005-2006: (Vyvyan Alexander) Gordon Tregear
- 2006-2007: Charles Torquil de Montalt Fraser
- 2007–2008: Colin Peter John Field
- 2008-2009: Sir Richard Drake Kleinwort
- 2009-2010: Simon Fairfax Knight
- 2010–2011: Elizabeth Bennett
- 2011-2012: David Henry Tupper of Petworth
- 2012-2013: Andrew John Patrick Stephenson Clarke
- 2013-2014: (David) Patrick Henry Burgess of Chichester
- 2014–2015: Jonathan Charles Lucas of Warnham Park, Horsham
- 2015-2016: Denise Lesley Anne Patterson of Aldwick Bay, Bognor Regis
- 2016–2017: (David) Mark Spofforth of Slindon, Sussex
- 2017–2018: Lady Emma Lavinia Barnard of Parham Park, Pulborough
- 2018–2019: Caroline Nicholls of Worthing
- 2019–2020: Davina Mary Irwin-Clark of Handcross, Haywards Heath
- 2020–2021: Dr Timothy John Charles Fooks of Pulborough
- 2021–2022: John Neil Hart of Bepton, Midhurst
- 2022–2023: James Nicholas Whitmore of Pulborough
- 2023–2024: Andrew Graham Bliss of Horsted Keynes
- 2024–2025: Philippa Mary Gogarty of Bosham
- 2025–2026: Dr Timothy John Charles Fooks, of Pulborough
- 2026–2027: Gary Richard Shipton, of Tangmere
