= Lord Lieutenant of West Sussex =

Civil post in West Sussex, England

This is a complete list of people who have served as Lord Lieutenant of West Sussex since the creation of the office and the county on 1 April 1974:

- 1 April 1974 – 31 January 1975: Bernard Fitzalan-Howard, 16th Duke of Norfolk (previously Lord Lieutenant of Sussex)
- 19 May 1975 – 1990: Lavinia Fitzalan-Howard, Duchess of Norfolk
- 23 March 1990 – 1994: Charles Gordon-Lennox, 10th Duke of Richmond
- 29 July 1994 – 1999: Major-General Sir Philip Ward
- 12 July 1999 – 2008: Hugh Wyatt
- 24 November 2008 – 2022: Dame Susan Pyper
- 23 May 2022 – present: Lady Emma Barnard
