= Goodwood Cricket =

Cricket club

Coordinates: 50.871°N 0.741°W

Goodwood Cricket Club
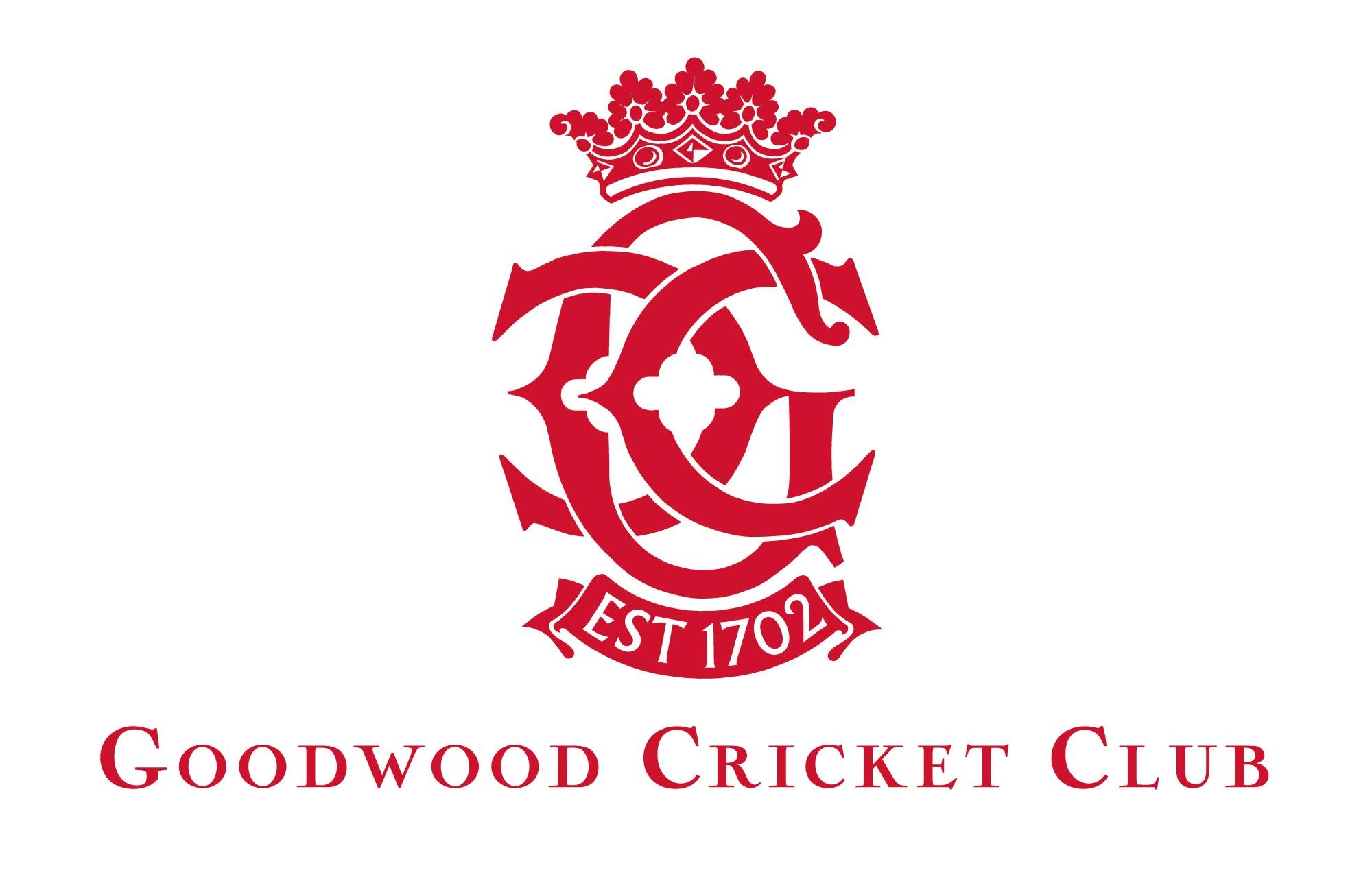

Personnel
- Captain: James Mayne
- Coach: None
- Owner: The Duke of Richmond and Gordon
- Chief executive: Richard Geffen

Team information
- Colours: Red and yellow
- Founded: 1702 (earliest record)
- Home ground: Goodwood Park
- Official website: http://www.goodwood.play-cricket.com Goodwood Website

Goodwood Cricket Club is a Sunday cricket team that play in the grounds of Goodwood Park, near Chichester. The ground overlooks Goodwood House and is owned by the Duke of Richmond and Gordon.

It is thought to be one of the oldest cricket clubs in the world. A receipt for brandy in 1702, held at Goodwood House, records the first reference to cricket at Goodwood. Charles Lennox, 2nd Duke of Richmond, known as "the Duke who was Cricket", was a leader in developing the game around Sussex. His enthusiasm was continued by Charles Lennox, 4th Duke of Richmond who was one of the original backers of Thomas Lord, founder of Lord's Cricket Ground. Teams that have come under the auspices of Goodwood Cricket are the Duke of Richmond's XI, Lord March's XI, the Goodwood Cricket Club XIs and the Goodwood Staff XI. The cricket club was resurrected by the 4th Duke in 1813.

In August 1826, the Hampshire Telegraph and Naval Chronicle reported that "[a] Grand Match of Cricket was played in Goodwook Park, yesterday, by Lord Dunwich and ten Noblemen and Gentlemen, visitors at Goodwood House, against eleven of the Goodwood Cricket Club for 500 sovereigns", with the club members winning by a score of 157 to 150.

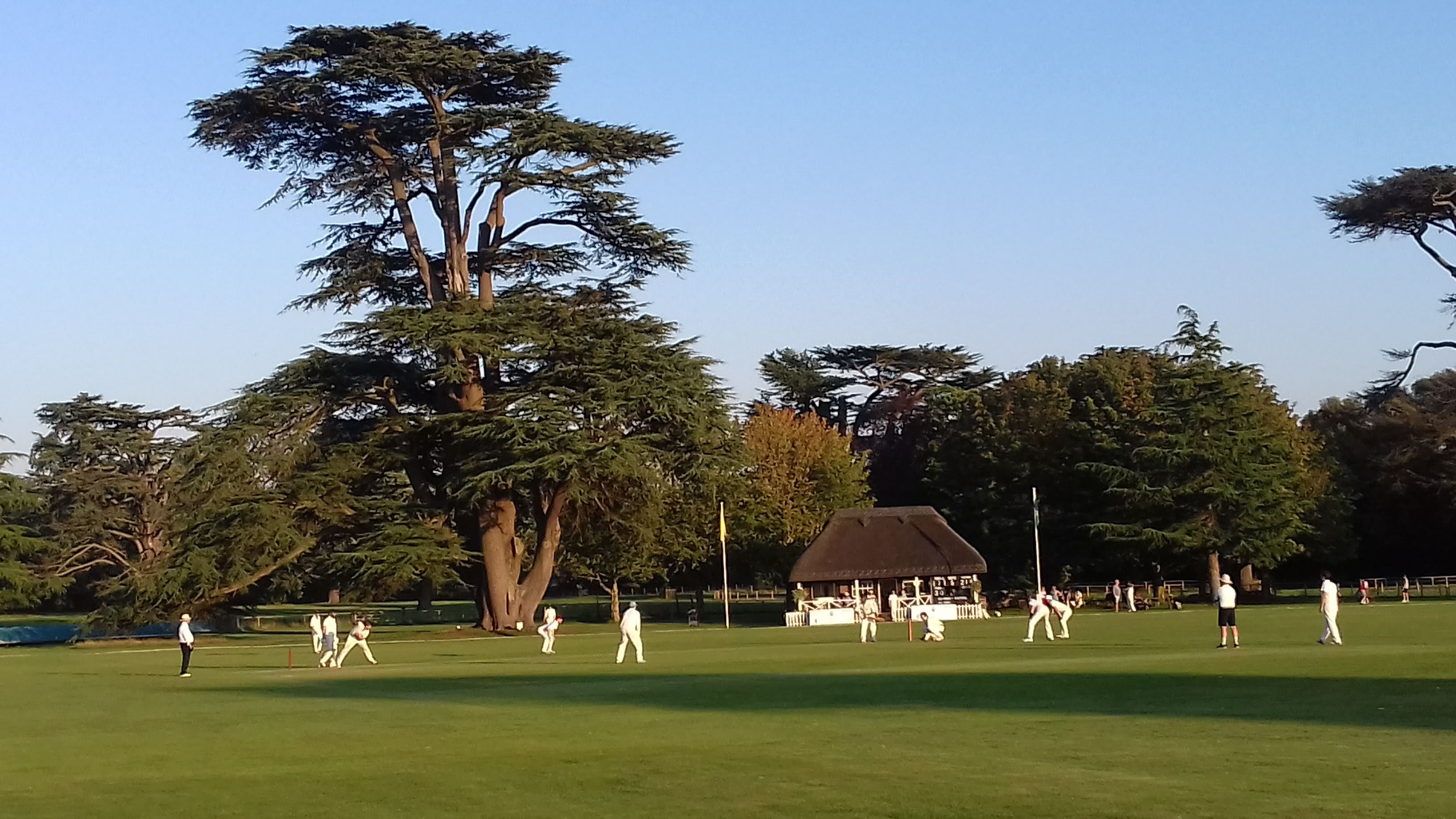

Today, Goodwood CC is run by a group of volunteers. The Club formed an alliance in 2017 with Chichester Priory Park CC, whose 1st and 2nd XIs play at the ground on Saturdays. A 31-metre Lebanon Cedar tree overlooks the club. It was planted in 1761.

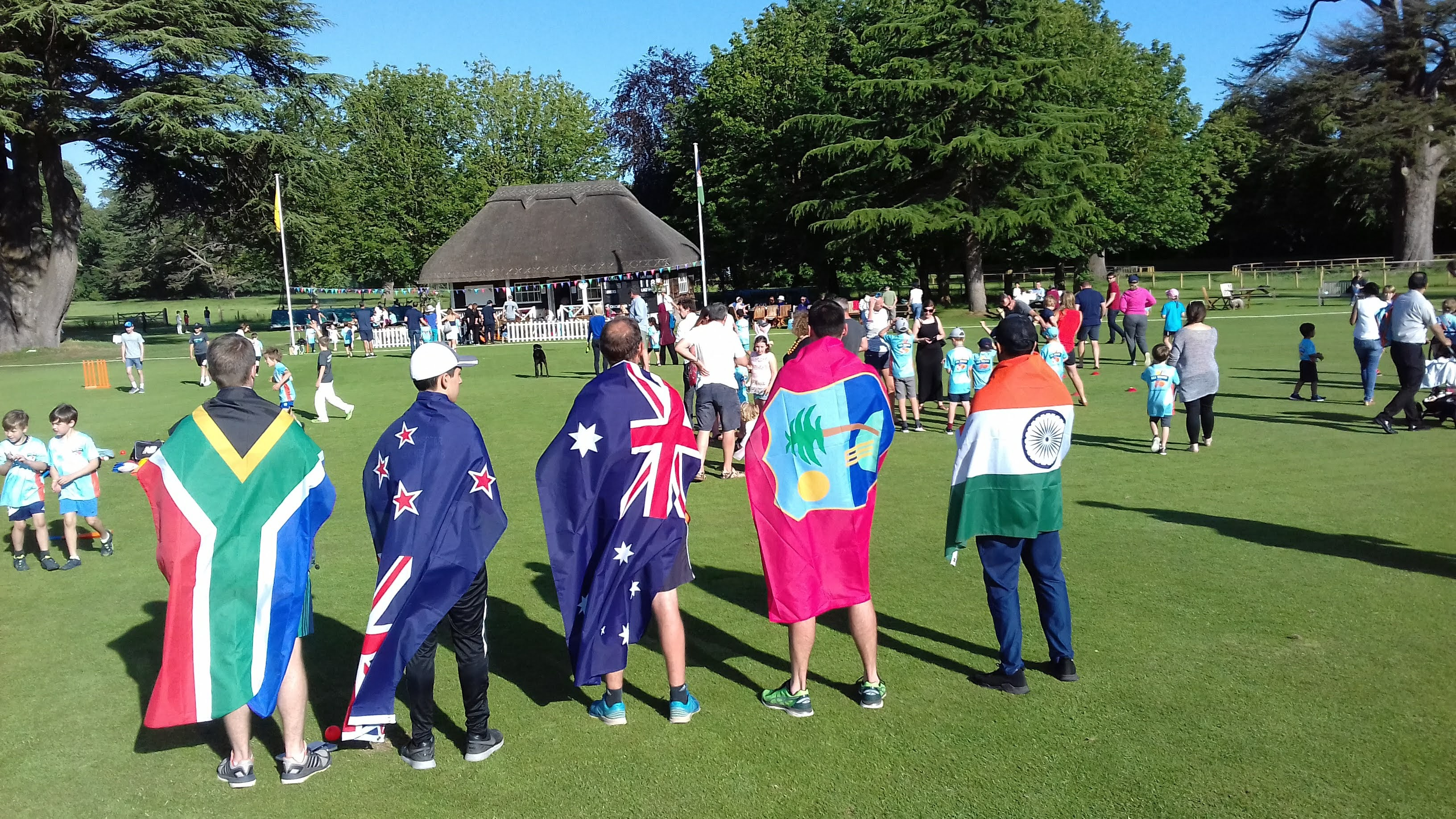

== Related people ==
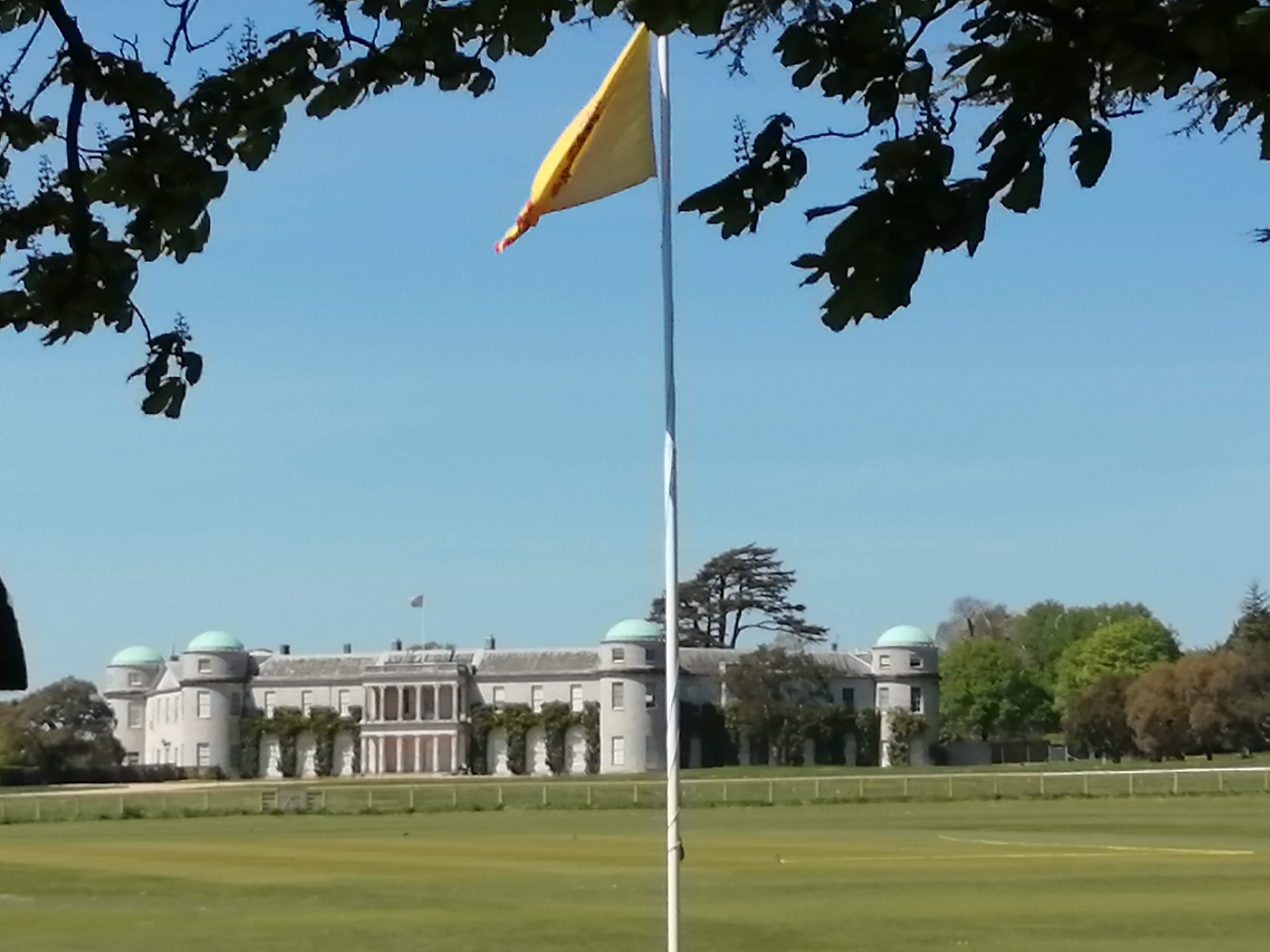

The club has played host to a variety of players, including:

- James Lillywhite, Captain of England (employee of the Duke)
- Sir Colin Cowdrey
- Ted Dexter
- Jim Parks (cricketer, born 1931)
- John Snow
- Allan Wells
- Ian Salisbury
- Graham Gooch
- Nasser Hussain
- Adam Zampa
- Ray Lindwall
- Devon Malcolm
- Gladstone Small
- Simon Jones
- Adam Hollioake
- Nick Compton
- Sam Robson
- Jofra Archer played at Goodwood for Middleton CC v Goodwood CC 27.7.2014

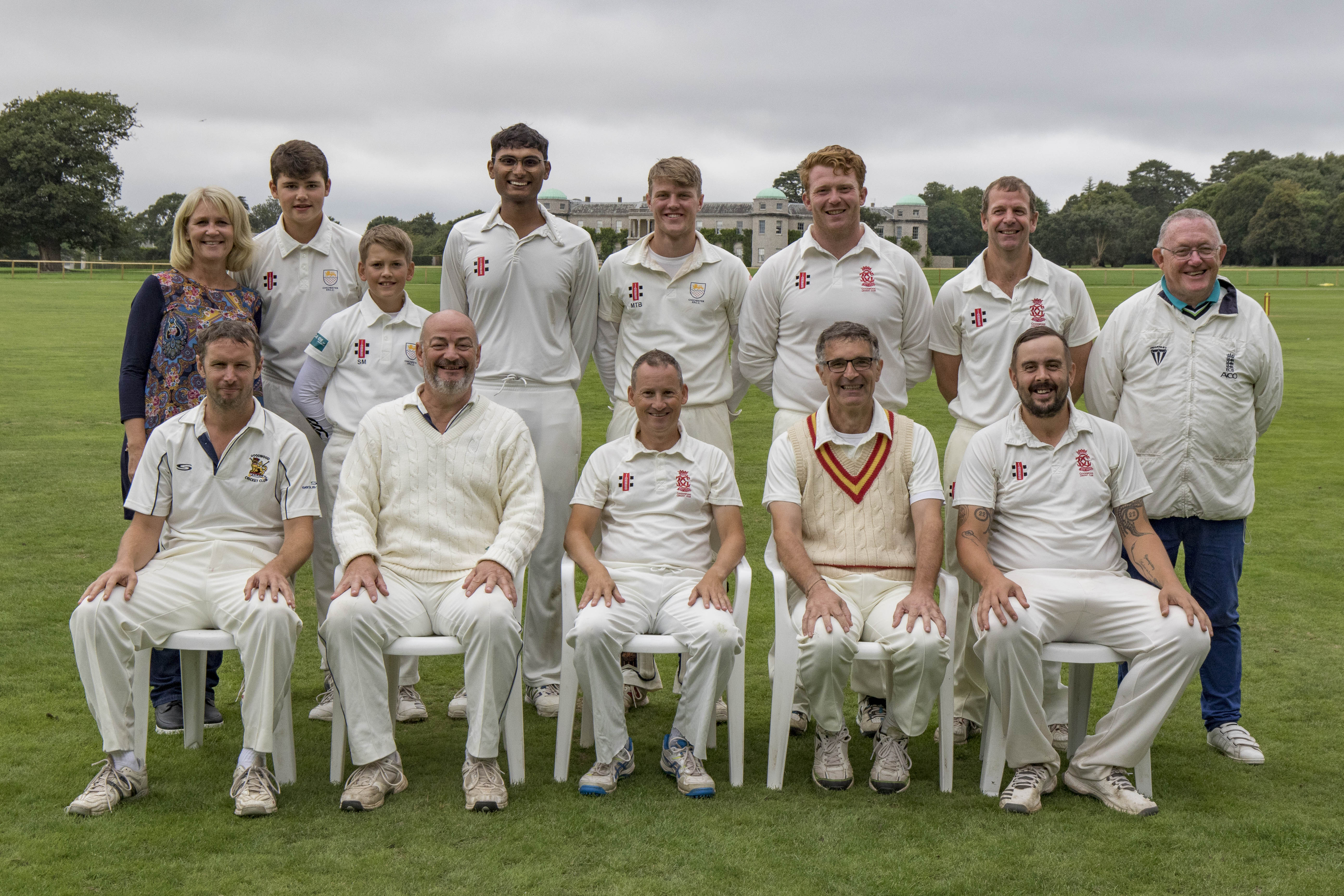
The Goodwood Cricket Team of 2018
