= Chichester/Goodwood Airfield =

SmLl grass airfield in the United Kingdom

Chichester/Goodwood Airfield Goodwood Airfield
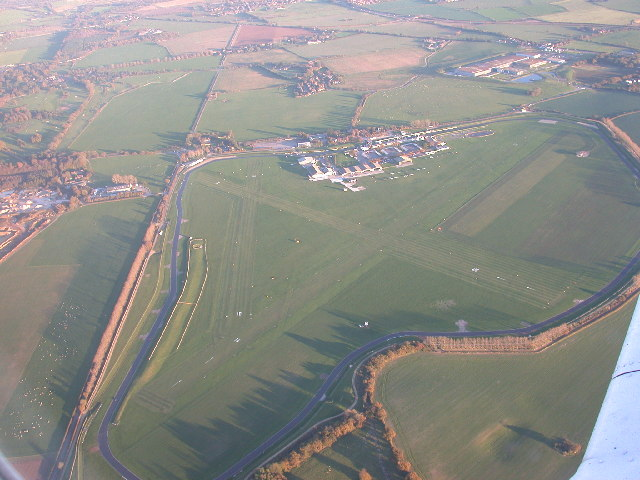
- Aerial photograph taken on 17 November 2005
- IATA: QUG; ICAO: EGHR

Summary
- Airport type: Private
- Operator: Goodwood Road Racing Company Ltd
- Location: Westhampnett; West Sussex
- Elevation AMSL: 110 ft (34 m)
- Coordinates: 50°51′34″N 000°45′33″W
- Website: goodwood.com/aerodrome

Map
- Location in West Sussex

Runways
| Direction | Length | | Surface |
| Direction | m | ft | Surface |
|---|---|---|---|
| 06/24 | 799 | 2,621 | Grass |
| 10/28 | 613 | 2,011 | Grass |
| 14R/32L | 1,300 | 4,265 | Grass |
| 14L/32R; Relief | 726 | 2,382 | Grass |
- Sources: UK AIP at NATS

Chichester/Goodwood Airfield (IATA: QUG, ICAO: EGHR), normally referred to as Goodwood Airfield or Goodwood Aerodrome, is 1.5 nautical miles (2.8 km; 1.7 mi) north northeast of Chichester, West Sussex, England.

Chichester (Goodwood) Aerodrome has a CAA Ordinary Licence (Number P781) that allows flights for the public transport of passengers or for flying instruction as authorised by the licensee (Goodwood Road Racing Company Limited).

== Wartime use ==
The airfield was built during the Second World War by the Royal Air Force as a relief landing ground for nearby RAF Tangmere. The site was the former Westhampnett Farm and part of the Goodwood Estate. It was known as RAF Westhampnett.

=== RAF use ===
During the Battle of Britain two fighter squadrons (145 Sqn and 602 Sqn) were based at Westhampnett.

=== USAAF use ===
Westhampnett was also used by the United States Army Air Forces Eighth Air Force as a fighter airfield for the 308th and 309th Fighter Squadrons of the 31st Fighter Group from RAF Atcham and RAF High Ercall with Supermarine Spitfire Vs beginning on 27 July 1942.

The 31st FG flew its first sorties with RAF, (total of 1,286 losing 5 aircraft) on 10 September 1942, and flew last mission from Great Britain in late October 1942. The group then moved to Gibraltar and fought with the Twelfth Air Force in North Africa and Italy.

== Postwar use ==
After the war the airfield was returned to the Goodwood Estate and the perimeter track of the airfield has been used since the late 1940s for motor racing and called the Goodwood Circuit. The airfield currently has a flying school and historic aircraft.

== See also ==
- List of former Royal Air Force stations
- USAAF Eighth Air Force – World War II
- 31st Fighter Wing
