= Goodwood House =

Country house in West Sussex, England

Coordinates: 50.870904°N 0.741405°W

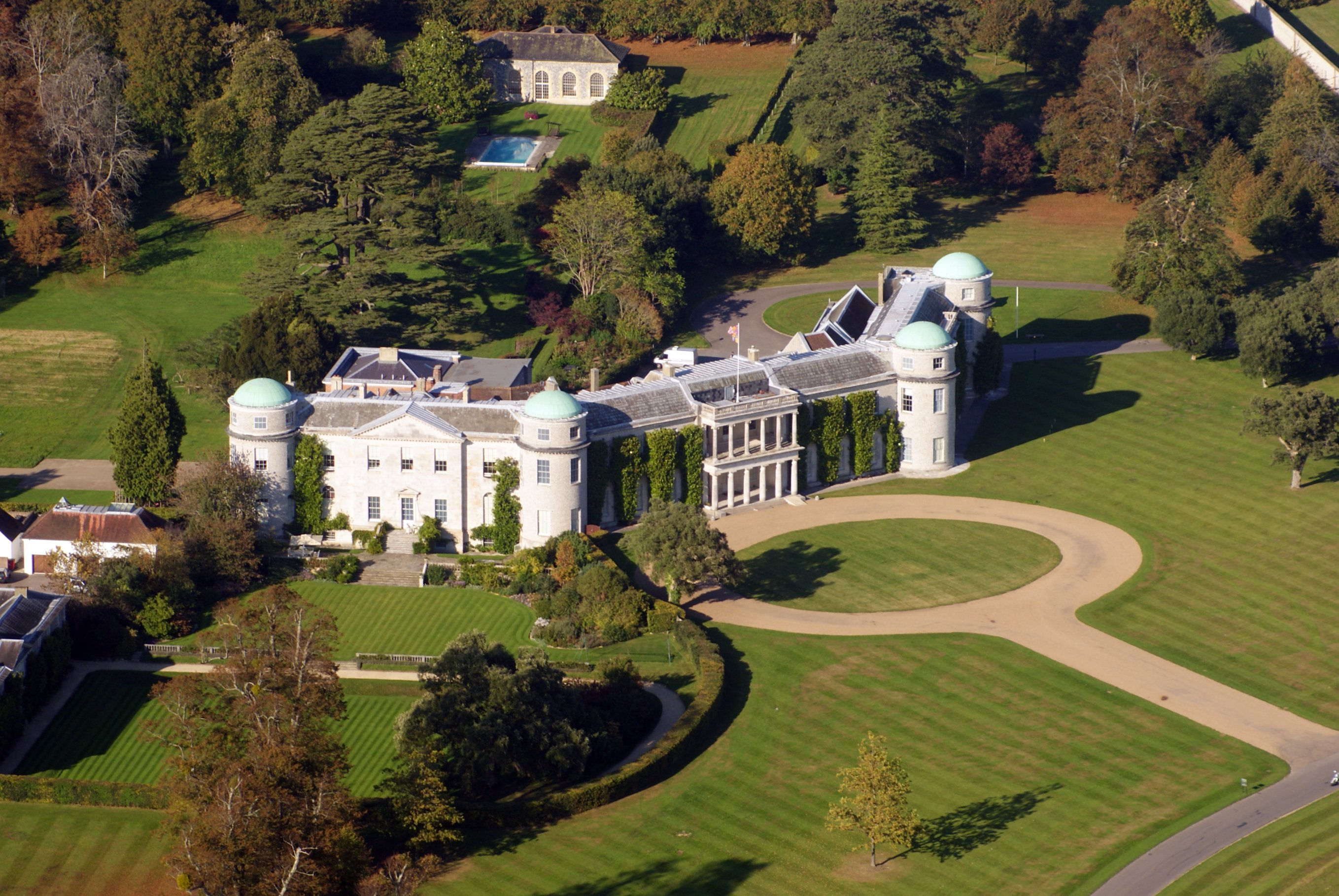
From the air

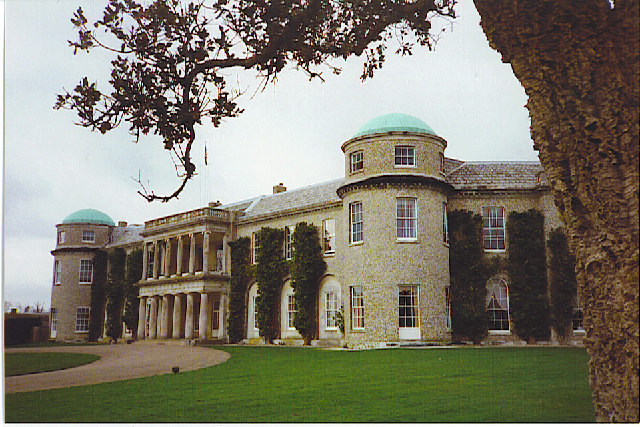
Goodwood House

Goodwood House is a Grade I listed country house, set within a 4,900 hectares (49 km^{2}) estate in Westhampnett, Chichester, West Sussex, England. The house in its present iteration is built around an existing Jacobean house, dating to 1617, to which a north and south wing were added during the eighteenth century. Since 1697, it has been the principal seat of the Dukes of Richmond. The estate hosts horse racing, motor racing and other events.

== Description ==
The house and its grounds are the site of the annual Goodwood Festival of Speed, whilst elsewhere on the estate the Goodwood Circuit motorsport track at Goodwood Airfield hosts the annual Goodwood Revival, and the airfield has a Flying School. Goodwood Racecourse hosts "Glorious Goodwood" and a number of other (horse) race meetings. Also held on the grounds is Goodwoof, an annual celebration of dogs. The event features a variety of activities for both dogs and their owners.

The estate includes two golf courses and a cricket pitch, home to Goodwood Cricket Club, a hotel and a 1,600 ha (16 km^{2}) organic farm. The estate employs over 550 people and attracts 800,000 visitors a year. The headquarters of Rolls-Royce Motor Cars is on the estate.

The Monarch's Way long-distance footpath crosses the downs from west to east, passing immediately south of the racecourse.

The landscaped park and woodlands of Goodwood are Grade I listed on the Register of Historic Parks and Gardens.

== History ==
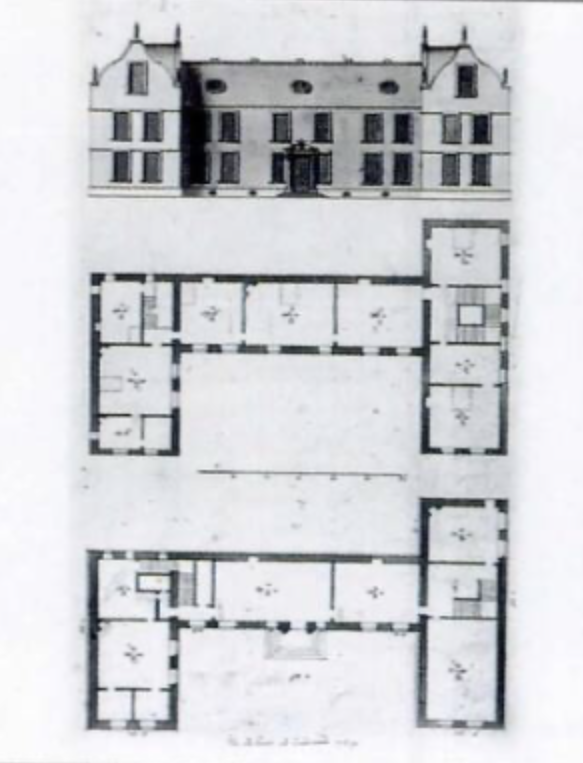
A plan of the Jacobean Goodwood House by Colen Campell, 1724.

Goodwood belonged in 1066 to Goduinus who built earthworks to defend his property against the invaders. Remains of these are still to be seen in the park. King William allowed him to retain his property and the Domesday Book (1086) records the manor as Godinwood; this form occurs until the reign of Queen Elizabeth when the spelling became Godingwood. In the reign of King Charles II the name of the estate became Goodwood. However a document of 1225 has the name as Godivewood, the meaning of which would be "Godgifu's wood", Gōdgifu being a woman's name cognate with Godiva.

The Jacobean core of Goodwood House was built in 1617 for Henry Percy, 9th Earl of Northumberland (also known as The Wizard Earl). In 1697, it was acquired by Charles Lennox, 1st Duke of Richmond, (an illegitimate son of Charles II, who had frequented the house in his youth) so that he could ride with the fashionable Charlton Hunt.

In the late 1740s, the second Duke commissioned a south-facing wing, likely designed by Matthew Brettingham, a project that remained unfinished at his death. The third Duke directed Sir William Chambers to complete the south wing, as well as design the stable block, which was completed in the late 1750s. Additionally, the third Duke commissioned James Wyatt to design a north wing and the kennels, completed in the early 1770s and late 1780s respectively. It may be that there was an intention to build the house in a unique octagonal layout, of which only three of the eight sides were completed, however that has never been proved. The third Duke also brought horse racing to the Goodwood Estate, establishing the racecourse in 1802, which held its first public meeting in the same year.

In 1901, the Goodwood Golf Course was laid out on the estate, during the sixth Duke's tenure. His son, the seventh Duke, was an acquaintance of Edward VII, a frequent visitor to Goodwood, where he enjoyed horse racing and the Duke's house parties.

In 1938, RAF Westhampnett was established on the estate, during the tenure of the ninth Duke. The airfield saw active use throughout the Second World War, following which it became known as Goodwood Airfield. In 1946, Tony Gaze, an Australian fighter pilot and racing driver, suggested to the ninth Duke that the perimeter road of the airfield would be ideal for motor racing, having flown from there during the War. The Duke, an amateur racing driver himself, took up the idea, and established the Goodwood Motor Circuit in 1948.

The house itself was requisitioned for use as a military hospital during the War. By 1945, it was assessed that damage incurred to the building during its time as a hospital amounted to £21,000. (Note: £21,000 in 1945 equates to approximately £784,000 in 2025, according to calculations based on the Consumer Price Index measure of inflation.) Post-war, and in view of reducing the costs to run Goodwood on a full scale, the ninth Duke moved into only one wing of the house, and divided several of the state rooms into estate offices. In 1948, the architectural historian, James Lees-Milne, visited the house, recording in his diary:

The house is not striking outside, the texture ugly. It is of unfinished octagonal plan, more strange than beautiful, with round towers at the angles, by Wyatt. The double portico resembles the one at Crichel. The inside is extremely plain and pleasing; 'chaste', Horace Walpole would have called it. The dining-room has a suite of rosewood furniture, inlaid with ebony. The sarcophagi chaste too. Several portraits of the Duchess of Portsmouth, progenitrix of the Dukes of Richmond. Not a pretty woman, and bad-tempered. Grey granite pillars from Guernsey in the hall. In the drawing-room the two famous Canaletti and a fine collection of Sèvres in wall cabinets. (Note: Goodwood houses a number of works by Canaletto. The "two famous Canaletti" which Lees-Milne references are likely the two views of London painted from the first floor of Richmond House, the former London residence of the Dukes of Richmond, commissioned by the second Duke in 1747.)

In the 1960s, the ninth Duke directed for much of the north wing to be demolished owing to dry rot. The tenth Duke set about making the somewhat dilapidated house structurally sound, before handing the tenure of the property to his son, the eleventh Duke (then the Earl of March), in 1994 who restored much of the house's interior.

In 1982, the Goodwood estate hosted the World Road Cycling Championships.

A large collection of documents from the Goodwood Estate Archives (1418–1984) is held by West Sussex Record Office.
