= West Sussex =

County of England

- Non-metropolitan and ceremonial county
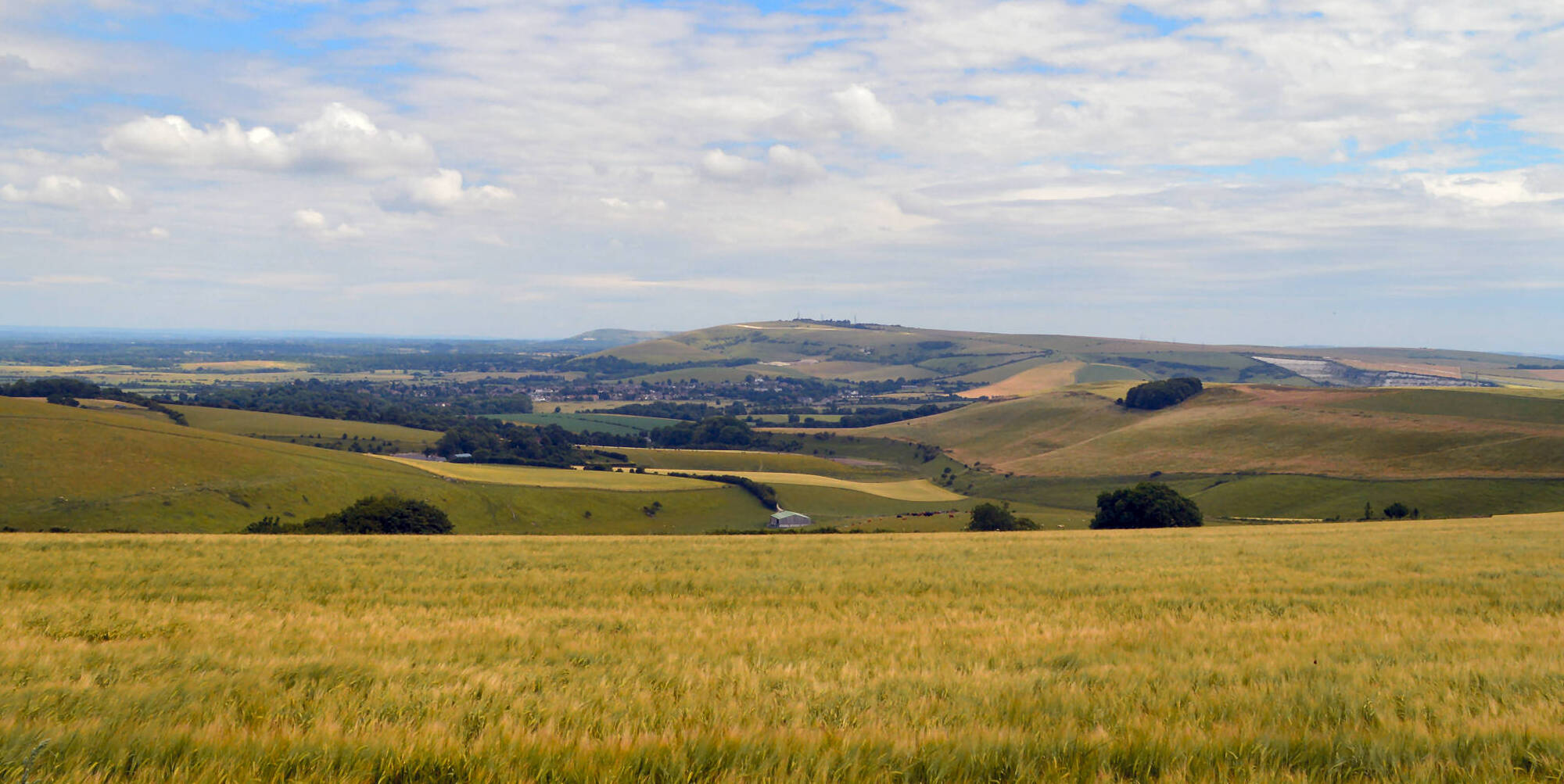
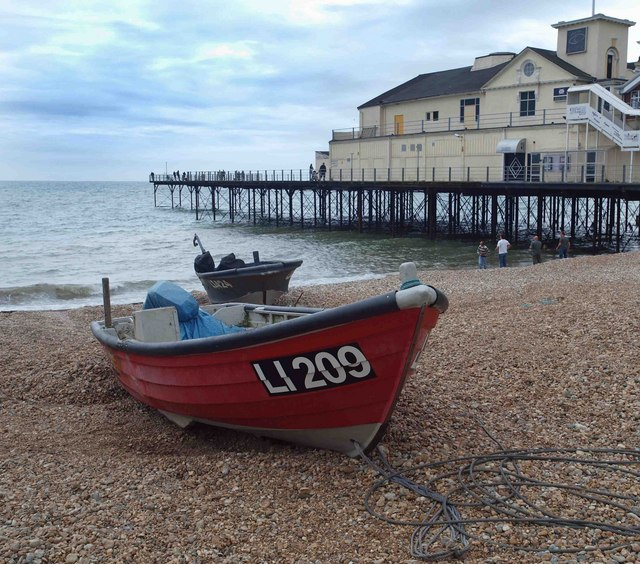
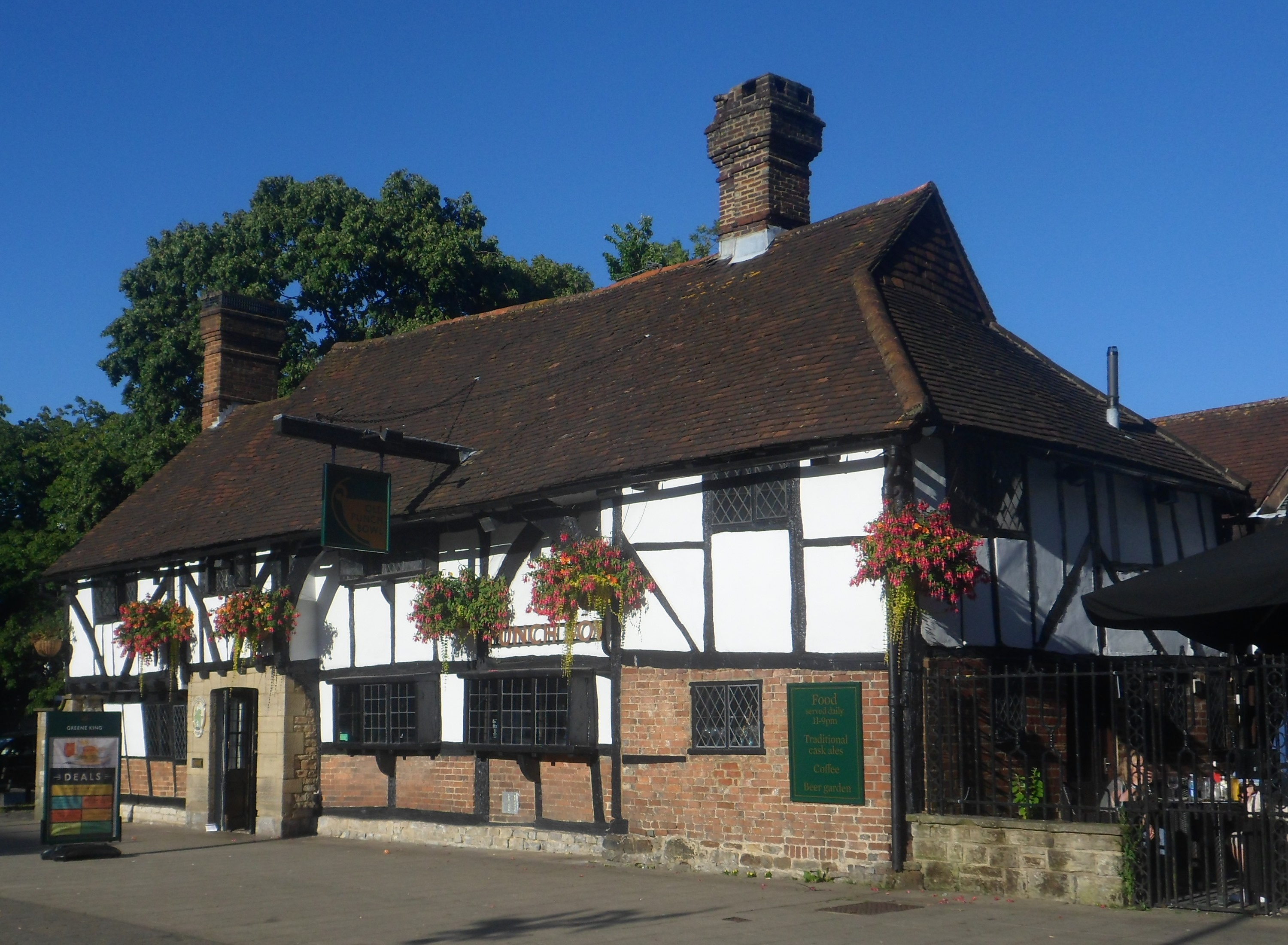
- The South Downs near Steyning; the beach and pier at Bognor Regis; and the Old Punch Bowl pub in Crawley, a Wealden hall house

- Coordinates: 50°55′N 0°30′W
- Sovereign state: United Kingdom
- Constituent country: England
- Region: South East England
- Established: 1974
- Time zone: UTC+0 (GMT)
  - Summer (DST): UTC+1 (BST)
- UK Parliament: 8 MPs
- Police: Sussex Police
- Ceremonial county
- Lord Lieutenant: Lady Emma Barnard
- High Sheriff: Gary Richard Shipton
- Area: 1,991 km^{2} (769 sq mi)
  - Rank: 30th of 48
- Population (2024): 915,037
  - Rank: 27th of 48
  - Density: 460/km^{2} (1,200/sq mi)
- Non-metropolitan county
- County council: West Sussex County Council
- Control: No overall control
- Admin HQ: Chichester
- Area: 1,991 km^{2} (769 sq mi)
  - Rank: 16th of 21
- Population (2025): 921,240
  - Rank: 8th of 21
  - Density: 463/km^{2} (1,200/sq mi)
- ISO 3166-2: GB-WSX
- GSS code: E10000032
- ITL: TLJ24
- Website: westsussex.gov.uk
- Districts
- Districts of West Sussex
- Districts: List: Worthing; Arun; Chichester; Horsham; Crawley; Mid Sussex; Adur

West Sussex is a ceremonial county in South East England. It is bordered by Surrey to the north, East Sussex to the east, the English Channel to the south, and Hampshire to the west. The largest settlement is Crawley.

The county has a land area of 1,991 square kilometres (769 sq mi) and an estimated population of 921,240 in 2025. The largest settlements are on the coast, and include the towns of Bognor Regis, Littlehampton, and Worthing; the last two are part of the Brighton and Hove built-up area, which extends into East Sussex. The interior of the county is generally rural, and contains the towns of Crawley and Horsham in the north-east and the city of Chichester in the south-west. For local government purposes West Sussex is a non-metropolitan county with seven districts. West Sussex and East Sussex were historically a single county, Sussex.

The South Downs are a defining feature of the county, crossing it from east to west and dividing the north and south. The downs are a chalk escarpment which falls away sharply into the Weald to the north and more gently toward the south, where there is a narrow strip of flat land between the hills and the coast. The coastal strip widens to the west, where it is punctuated by Chichester Harbour, a ria.

The county has a long history of human settlement dating back to the Lower Paleolithic era. During the Roman conquest of Britain, Romans conquered the Atrebates, West Sussex's indigenous Britons, and incorporated the area as a Roman province. During the Early Middle Ages, the Saxons settled the area, establishing the Kingdom of Sussex in 477, which lasted until c. 827 when the kingdom was annexed by Wessex. It is home to Gatwick Airport, the UK's the second-busiest airport by total passenger traffic. The county has a number of stately homes including Goodwood, Petworth House and Uppark, and castles such as Arundel Castle and Bramber Castle.

== History ==
The name Sussex, derived from the Old English 'Sūþseaxe' ('South Saxons'), dates from the Saxon period between AD 477 to 1066, and the history of human habitation in Sussex goes back to the Old Stone Age. The oldest hominin remains known in Britain were found at Eartham Pit, Boxgrove. Prehistoric monuments include the Devil's Jumps, a group of Bronze Age burial mounds, and the Iron Age Cissbury Ring and Chanctonbury Ring hill forts on the South Downs.

The Roman period saw the building of Fishbourne Roman Palace and rural villas such as Bignor Roman Villa together with a network of roads including Stane Street, the Chichester to Silchester Way and the Sussex Greensand Way. The Romans used the Weald for iron production on an industrial scale.

The foundation of the Kingdom of Sussex is recorded by the Anglo-Saxon Chronicle for the year AD 477; it says that Ælle arrived at a place called Cymenshore in three ships with his three sons and killed or put to flight the local inhabitants. The foundation story is regarded as somewhat of a myth by most historians, although the archaeology suggests that Saxons did start to settle in the area in the late 5th century. The Kingdom of Sussex was absorbed into Wessex as an earldom and became the county of Sussex.

With its origins in the kingdom of Sussex, the later county of Sussex was traditionally divided into six units known as rapes. By the 16th century, the three western rapes were grouped together informally, having their own separate Quarter Sessions. These were governed by a separate county council from 1888, the county of Sussex being divided into the administrative counties of East and West Sussex. In 1974, West Sussex was made a single ceremonial county with the coming into force of the Local Government Act 1972. At the same time a large part of the eastern rape of Lewes (the Mid Sussex district which includes the towns of Haywards Heath, Burgess Hill and East Grinstead) was transferred into West Sussex.

Until 1834, provision for the poor and destitute in West Sussex was made at parish level. From 1835 until 1948 eleven Poor Law Unions, each catering for several parishes, took on the job.

== Settlements ==
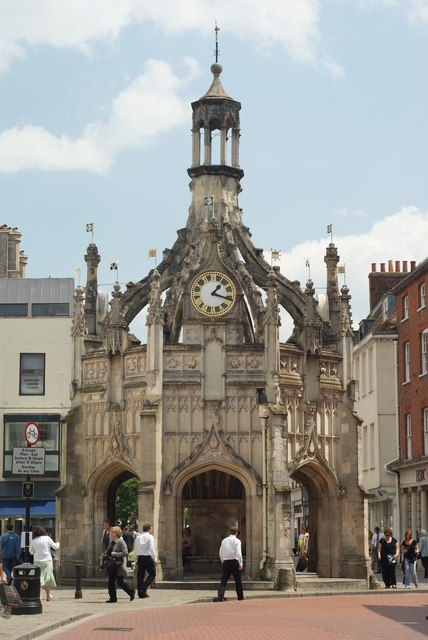
Chichester Market Cross

Most settlements in West Sussex are either along the south coast or in Mid Sussex, near the Brighton Main Line and M23/A23 corridor. At the 2021 census, the local authority districts of Crawley and Worthing had populations of about 118,500 and 111,400, respectively. The seaside resort of Bognor Regis and the market town of Horsham are both large towns. Chichester, the county town, has a cathedral and city status, and is situated not far from the border with Hampshire. Other conurbations of a similar size are Burgess Hill, East Grinstead and Haywards Heath in the Mid Sussex district, Littlehampton in the Arun district, and Lancing, Southwick and Shoreham in the Adur district. Much of the coastal town population is part of the Brighton/Worthing/Littlehampton conurbation.

Rustington and Southwater are the next largest settlements in the county. There are several more towns in West Sussex, including Arundel, Midhurst, Petworth, Selsey, Steyning, Henfield, Pulborough and Storrington. Other notable villages include Billingshurst, Copthorne, Crawley Down, Cuckfield, Hassocks, Hurstpierpoint and Lindfield.

== Geography ==
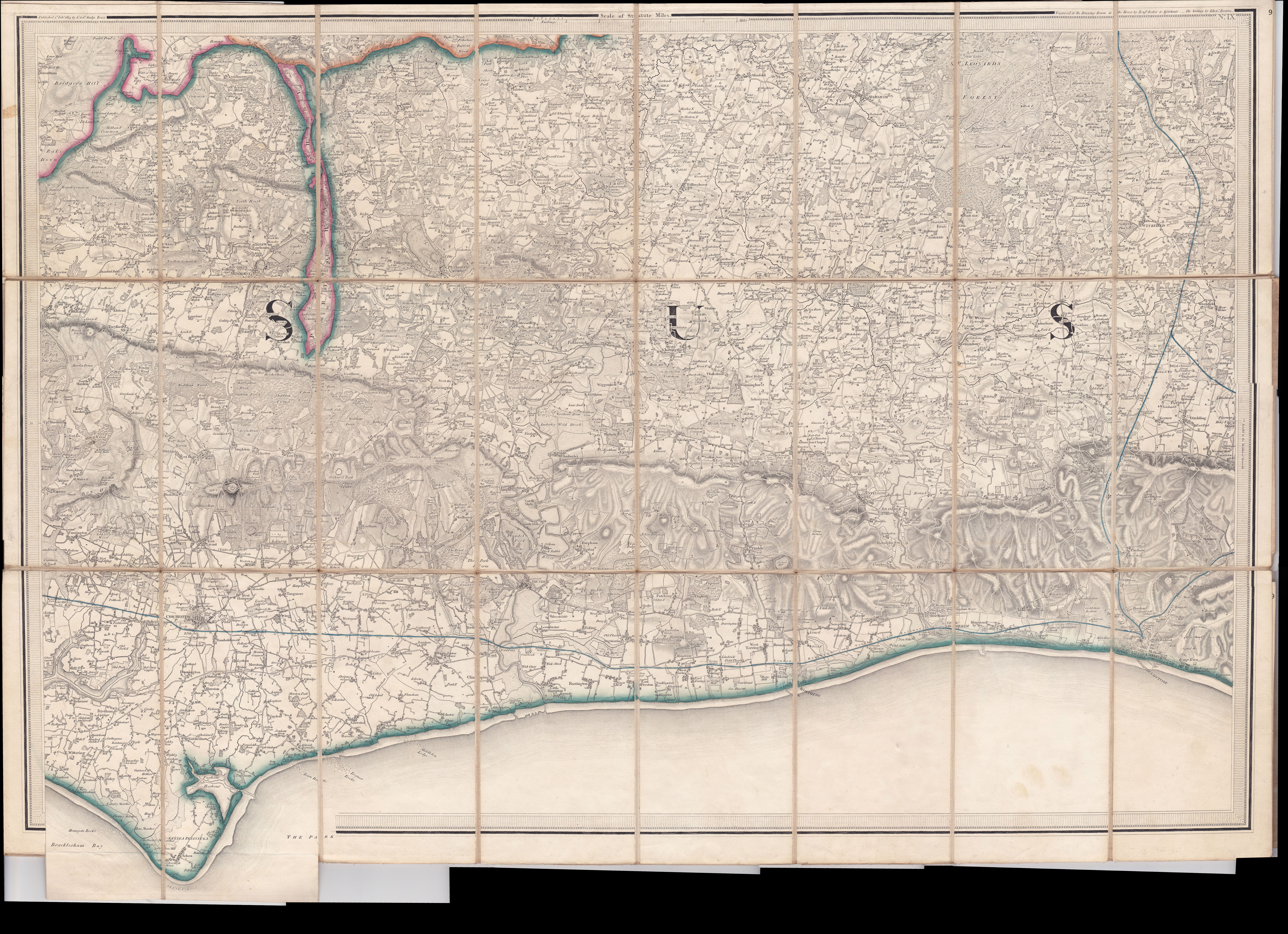
1813/54 one inch to the mile OS map

=== Physical geography ===
General map of West Sussex.

West Sussex is bordered by Hampshire to the west, Surrey to the north and East Sussex to the east. The English Channel lies to the south. The area has been formed from Upper Jurassic and Lower Cretaceous rock strata, part of the Weald–Artois Anticline. The eastern part of this ridge, the Weald of Kent, Sussex and Surrey has been greatly eroded, with the chalk surface removed to expose older Lower Cretaceous rocks of the Wealden Group. In West Sussex the exposed rock becomes older towards the north of the county with Lower Greensand ridges along the border with Surrey including the highest point of the county at Blackdown. Erosion of softer sand and clay strata has hollowed out the basin of the Weald leaving a north facing scarp slope of the chalk which runs east and west across the whole county, broken only by the valleys of the River Arun and River Adur. In addition to these two rivers which drain most of the county a winterbourne, the River Lavant, flows intermittently from springs on the dip slope of the chalk downs north of Chichester. Some intermittent streams are known in the local dialect as "rifes".

The county makes up 1.52% of the total land of England, making it the 30th largest county in the country.

Bognor Regis

Climate chart (precipitation, max. and min. temperature)
J	F	M	A	M	J	J	A	S	O	N	D
76 8 3	50 8 3	56 10 4	47 13 6	44 16 9	44 19 12	41 21 14	51 21 14	59 19 12	92 15 9	83 11 6	82 9 4
- █ Average max. and min. temperatures in °C
- █ Precipitation totals in mm
- Source: Met Office
Imperial conversion
J	F	M	A	M	J	J	A	S	O	N	D
3 46 38	2 46 37	2.2 50 40	1.8 55 42	1.7 61 48	1.7 65 53	1.6 70 57	2 70 57	2.3 66 53	3.6 60 49	3.3 52 42	3.2 47 38
- █ Average max. and min. temperatures in °F
- █ Precipitation totals in inches

=== Climate ===
West Sussex is the sunniest county in the United Kingdom, according to Met Office records. Over the 29 years to 2011 it averaged 1902 hours of sunshine per year. Sunshine totals are highest near the coast with Bognor Regis often having the highest in mainland England, including a total of 2237 hours in 1990. Mean annual temperature for southern coastal counties is around 11 °C. The coldest month, January, has mean daily minimum temperatures of around 3 °C near the coast and lower inland. July tends to be the warmest month when mean daily maxima tend to be around 20 °C. A maximum temperature of 35.8 °C occurred at Wiggonholt on 24th June 2026. Coastal high temperatures are often moderated by cooler sea breezes.

Monthly rainfall tends to be highest in autumn and early winter and lowest in the summer months, with July often being the driest month. There is less rainfall from summer convective showers and thunderstorms than in inland areas. The county can suffer both from localised flooding caused by heavy rainfall and from water shortages caused by prolonged periods of below average rainfall. Winter rainfall is needed to recharge the chalk aquifers from which much of the water supply is drawn.

== Communications and transport ==
The M23 motorway runs from London to the south of Crawley. The A23 and A24 roads run from London to Brighton and Worthing respectively with the A29 a little further west ending in Bognor Regis. Other major roads are the A272 which runs east to west through the middle of the county and the A27 which does the same but closer to the coast. The A259 is a local alternate route to the A27 in the eastern coastal strip.

Gatwick Airport is to the north of Crawley. It handled approximately 42.8 million terminal passengers in 2025, the second-highest total among UK airports. There is a smaller local general aviation airport, Shoreham Airport in Lancing near Shoreham-by-Sea, and a grass airfield handling light aircraft and helicopters, Chichester/Goodwood Airfield, enclosed within the Goodwood motor racing circuit.

There are three main railway routes: the Brighton Main Line, the Arun Valley line and the West Coastway line. The Portsmouth Direct line serves and occasionally enters the westernmost part of West Sussex, although it has no railway stations in the county.

== Politics ==
=== Members of Parliament ===
Since the 2024 general election, West Sussex has been represented by Three Conservative, three Labour and three Liberal Democrat Members of Parliament (MPs).

Constituency	Member of Parliament	Party
Arundel & South Downs	Andrew Griffith	Conservative
Bognor Regis & Littlehampton	Alison Griffiths	Conservative
Chichester	Jess Brown-Fuller	Liberal Democrat
Crawley	Peter Lamb	Labour
East Grinstead & Uckfield (part)	Mims Davis	Conservative
Horsham	John Milne	Liberal Democrat
Mid Sussex	Alison Bennett	Liberal Democrat
East Worthing and Shoreham	Tom Rutland	Labour
Worthing West	Beccy Cooper	Labour

=== County Council ===
The coat of arms of West Sussex County Council

West Sussex County Council (WSCC) is the authority that governs the non-metropolitan county of West Sussex. The county contains 7 district and borough councils (Adur, Arun, Chichester, Crawley, Horsham, Mid Sussex and Worthing), and 159 town, parish and neighbourhood councils.

West Sussex County Council has 70 councillors. As of the 2026 local elections, there are 23 Liberal Democrat councillors, 23 Reform UK councillors, 11 Conservatives, 7 Green councillors, 5 Labour Party councillors, and 1 Local Alliance councillor. The council is currently run by a Liberal Democrat-led coalition which also includes the Green Party, Labour, and the Local Alliance. The Chief Executive and their team of executive directors are responsible for the day-to-day running of the council.

West Sussex County Council is based at County Hall, Chichester and provides a large range of services including education, social services, fire and rescue, libraries, trading standards, town and country planning, refuse disposal and consumer services.

=== West Sussex Youth Cabinet ===
The West Sussex Youth Cabinet is a group of local representatives and four UK Youth Parliament (UKYP) representatives, who are elected by young people in West Sussex. The Youth Cabinet represents the views of the young people West Sussex at county level. Elections for the Youth Cabinet and UKYP in West Sussex run every year in March.

== Places of interest ==
=== Nature and zoos ===
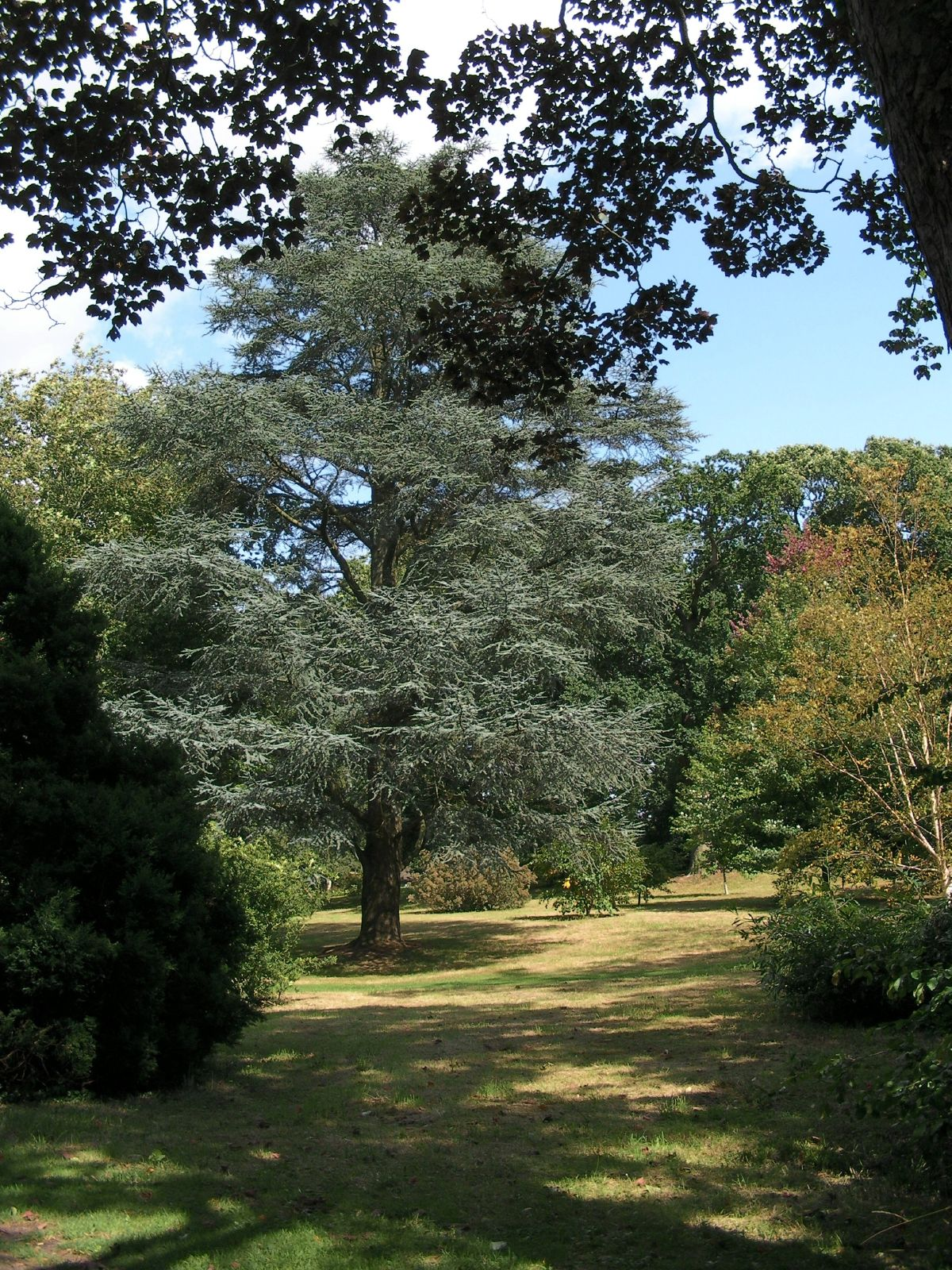
Wakehurst Place Gardens, Ardingly

- Chichester Harbour
- Pagham Harbour – A protected area of wetland that is an important feeding ground for birds.
- RSPB Pulborough Brooks
- Selsey Bill
- South Downs Way – a long distance footpath
- Stansted Park
- St Leonard's Forest
- Tilgate Park
- Wakehurst Place
- Warnham Local Nature Reserve, a 92-acre site with visitor centre
- WWT Arundel (a nature reserve of the Wildfowl and Wetlands Trust)

=== Castles, houses and other buildings ===
- Arundel Castle
- Barnham Windmill
- Bramber Castle
- Christ's Hospital, an old charitable school notable for its archaic uniforms and picturesque campus
- Goodwood House and Goodwood Motor Circuit
- High Salvington windmill
- Hurstpierpoint College, a public school, notable for its substantial Sussex flint buildings and large campus
- Lancing College, a public school, notable for its substantial Sussex sandstone chapel and large campus
- Seaford College, a public school known for its large campus
- Nymans house and gardens, a National Trust property near Handcross, Haywards Heath
- Petworth House and deer park.
- Queen Victoria Hospital, East Grinstead, where Sir Archibald McIndoe carried out reconstructive surgery for burns patients during the Second World War
- Sackville College, a Jacobean almshouse in East Grinstead
- Saint Hill Manor, East Grinstead
- Shipley Windmill, (no longer open to the public)
- Standen, East Grinstead
- Uppark, a 17th-century mansion high on the South Downs

=== Religious buildings ===
The Cathedral Church of the Holy Trinity, otherwise called Chichester Cathedral, is the seat of the Anglican Bishop of Chichester. It was founded as a cathedral in 1075, when the seat of the bishop was moved from Selsey Abbey. The cathedral has architecture in both the Norman and the Gothic styles, and has been called by the architectural historian Nikolaus Pevsner "the most typical English Cathedral". The Cathedral Church of Our Lady and St Philip Howard in Arundel is the Roman Catholic cathedral of the Diocese of Arundel and Brighton. Built in French Gothic style and dedicated in 1873 as the Catholic parish church of Arundel, it was not designated a cathedral until the foundation of the diocese in 1965.

Bosham Church is partly of Saxon construction and is shown on the Bayeux Tapestry as the local church of late Saxon and Danish kings of England. Many other Saxon and early Norman churches have survived in the county with little alteration including the Church of St Mary the Blessed Virgin, Sompting, an 11th-century Anglo-Saxon church with a Rhenish helm unique in England and St. Nicholas Church, Worth, a 10th-century church in Worth, Crawley. Some Anglican churches and many of the numerous nonconformist chapels in the county have been converted to residential use. Cittaviveka is a Buddhist monastery in Chithurst.

=== Museums ===
- Amberley Museum & Heritage Centre
- Crawley Museum
- Horsham Museum
- Manor Cottage
- Steyning Museum
- Tangmere Military Aviation Museum
- Weald and Downland Open Air Museum of historic buildings at Singleton
- Wings Museum, Balcombe
- Worthing Museum & Art Gallery

=== Arts ===
Pallant House Gallery in Chichester houses one of the most significant collections of 20th-century British art outside London. It includes a substantial body of early and mid-20th-century work bequeathed by Walter Hussey and many later works donated by Colin St. John Wilson.

Worthing Museum and Art Gallery houses a large collection of Georgian and Victorian costume. The Cass Sculpture Foundation has an outdoor sculpture park at Goodwood.

== Economy ==
Trend of regional gross value added of West Sussex at current basic prices published by Office for National Statistics with figures in millions of British Pounds Sterling.
Year	Regional gross value added (Note: Components may not sum to totals due to rounding)	Agriculture (Note: includes hunting and forestry)	Industry (Note: includes energy and construction)	Services (Note: includes financial intermediation services indirectly measured)
1995	8,564	208	2,239	6,116
2000	10,576	162	2,545	7,869
2003	12,619	185	2,520	9,915

Significant companies in the county include Rolls-Royce Motor Cars, a substantial employer near Chichester. Gatwick Airport, with associated airlines including British Airways and Virgin Atlantic, is a major source of direct and indirect employment. Thales Group also has a presence in the county. Nestlé has their UK headquarters in Crawley.

=== Agriculture ===
West Sussex developed distinctive land uses along with its neighbours in the weald. The Landrace cattle transformed into Sussex cattle and Sussex chickens emerged about the time of the Roman conquest. Some of the earliest evidence of horses in Britain has been found at Boxgrove, dated to 500,000 BC. Viticulture is a part of the economy, with wineries producing mainly sparkling wine of varied quality.

== Demographics ==
The table below shows the population change up to the 2011 census, contrasting the previous census. It also shows the proportion of residents in each district reliant upon lowest income and/or joblessness benefits, the national average proportion of which was 4.5% as at August 2012, the year for which latest datasets have been published. It can be seen that the most populous district of West Sussex is Arun containing the towns of Arundel, Bognor Regis and Littlehampton:

Population from census to census. Claimants of JSA or Income Support (DWP)
Area	Population (April 2021)	JSA or Inc. Supp. claimants (August 2021) % of 2021 population	Population (April 2011)	JSA or Inc. Supp. claimants (August 2012) % of 2011 population	Population (April 2001)	JSA and Income Support claimants (August 2001) % of 2001 population
West Sussex	882,676	4.3%	806,892	2.7%	753,614	5.1%
Adur	64,544	4.9%	61,182	3.2%	59,627	6.3%
Arun	164,889	4.7%	149,518	3.0%	140,759	6.4%
Chichester	124,068	4.1%	113,794	2.3%	106,450	4.8%
Crawley	118,493	6.5%	106,597	3.8%	99,744	5.3%
Horsham	146,778	3.1%	131,301	1.9%	122,088	3.3%
Mid Sussex	152,566	2.8%	139,860	1.6%	127,378	3.6%
Worthing	111,338	4.9%	104,640	3.6%	97,568	6.7%

The total population of the county, as of the 2021 census, makes up 1.56% of England's population.

== Education ==
West Sussex has a comprehensive education system, with a mix of county-maintained secondary schools and academies and over twenty independent senior schools. In addition primary education is provided through a mix of around 240 infant, junior, primary, first and middle schools.

Further education and sixth-form colleges in the county include The College of Richard Collyer, Chichester College, Crawley College, Northbrook College and Worthing College.

Independent schools in the county include Christ's Hospital near Horsham, whose students wear Tudor style uniform, Seaford College, Lancing College and Hurstpierpoint College.

Tertiary education is provided by the University of Chichester and Chichester College.

== Sport ==
At least 40 sports are active in West Sussex. Sussex CCC was the first first-class county cricket club, formed in 1839, and was a cradle for club cricket. Sussex is home to Fontwell Park Racecourse. The county has one Football League club located in Crawley, that is Crawley Town F.C.

== Media ==
BBC South television covers the county excluding Haywards Heath, Burgess Hill, East Grinstead and Shoreham-by-Sea which are covered by BBC South East. ITV Meridian also covers the county. Crawley is covered by both regions and by BBC London and ITV London.

BBC Radio Sussex is the BBC local radio station for the county, broadcast from studios in Brighton. The commercial local radio station is Heart South, and community radio stations in the county are More Radio Worthing (serving Worthing, Shoreham, and Littlehampton), More Radio Mid-Sussex (serving Burgess Hill and Haywards Heath), 107 Meridian FM (for East Grinstead) and V2 Radio (for Chichester).

== See also ==
- Lord Lieutenant of West Sussex
- High Sheriff of West Sussex
- List of hills of West Sussex
- The Royal Sussex Regiment
- Healthcare in Sussex
- Sussex dialect
