= List of civil parishes in West Sussex =

This is a list of civil parishes in the ceremonial county of West Sussex, England. There are 157 civil parishes. Population figures are unavailable for some of the smallest parishes.

The former Shoreham by Sea Urban District, Crawley Urban District, Worthing Municipal Borough and Southwick Urban District are unparished.

Civil parish	Civil parish population 2011	Area (km^{2}) 2011	Pre-1974 district	District
Albourne	644	7.73	Cuckfield Rural District	Mid Sussex
Aldingbourne	3,819	12.53	Chichester Rural District	Arun
Aldwick	11,282	3.83	Bognor Regis Urban District	Arun
Amberley	586	11.66	Chanctonbury Rural District	Horsham
Angmering	7,614	17.82	Worthing Rural District	Arun
Ansty and Staplefield	1,756	38.70	Cuckfield Rural District	Mid Sussex
Appledram	169	3.72	Chichester Rural District	Chichester
Ardingly	1,936	16.09	Cuckfield Rural District	Mid Sussex
Arundel (town)	3,475	12.14	Arundel Municipal Borough Chichester Rural District	Arun
Ashington	2,526	8.05	Chanctonbury Rural District	Horsham
Ashurst	279	10.06	Chanctonbury Rural District	Horsham
Ashurst Wood	1,833	2.51	East Grinstead Urban District	Mid Sussex
Balcombe	1,917	21.05	Cuckfield Rural District	Mid Sussex
Barlavington			Petworth Rural District	Chichester
Barnham and Eastergate	4,808	7.43	Chichester Rural District	Arun
Bepton	234	7.93	Midhurst Rural District	Chichester
Bersted	8,496	7.13	Chichester Rural District	Arun
Bignor			Petworth Rural District	Chichester
Billingshurst	8,232	32.19	Horsham Rural District	Horsham
Birdham	1,483	6.44	Chichester Rural District	Chichester
Bognor Regis (town)	24,064	4.41	Bognor Regis Urban District	Arun
Bolney	1,366	14.79	Cuckfield Rural District	Mid Sussex
Bosham	2,900	11.00	Chichester Rural District	Chichester
Boxgrove	957	11.69	Chichester Rural District	Chichester
Bramber	785	7.16	Chanctonbury Rural District	Horsham
Broadbridge Heath	3,112	2.16	Horsham Rural District	Horsham
Burgess Hill (town)	30,109	9.47	Burgess Hill Urban District	Mid Sussex
Burpham	145	12.38	Worthing Rural District	Arun
Bury	642	13.09	Petworth Rural District	Chichester
Chichester (city)	26,795	10.67	Chichester Municipal Borough	Chichester
Chidham and Hambrook	1,356	6.39	Chichester Rural District	Chichester
Clapham	275	5.15	Worthing Rural District	Arun
Climping	771	6.35	Chichester Rural District	Arun
Cocking	420	10.16	Midhurst Rural District	Chichester
Coldwaltham	941	8.84	Chanctonbury Rural District	Horsham
Colgate	1,087	22.44	Horsham Rural District	Horsham
Compton	463	24.14	Chichester Rural District	Chichester
Coombes			Worthing Rural District	Adur
Cowfold	1,904	19.26	Horsham Rural District	Horsham
Cuckfield	3,500	4.32	Cuckfield Urban District	Mid Sussex
Donnington	2,059	4.52	Chichester Rural District	Chichester
Duncton	345	8.01	Petworth Rural District	Chichester
Earnley	459	6.52	Chichester Rural District	Chichester
Eartham	111	13.31	Chichester Rural District	Chichester
Easebourne	1,820	17.95	Midhurst Rural District	Chichester
East Dean	206	16.64	Chichester Rural District	Chichester
East Grinstead (town)	26,383	24.43	East Grinstead Urban District	Mid Sussex
East Lavington	273	7.97	Midhurst Rural District	Chichester
East Preston	5,938	2.00	Worthing Rural District	Arun
East Wittering	4,658	3.45	Chichester Rural District	Chichester
Ebernoe	213	12.39	Petworth Rural District	Chichester
Elsted and Treyford	246	15.90	Midhurst Rural District	Chichester
Felpham	9,746	3.87	Bognor Regis Urban District	Arun
Fernhurst	2,942	23.37	Midhurst Rural District	Chichester
Ferring	4,480	3.82	Worthing Rural District	Arun
Findon	2,023	16.14	Worthing Rural District	Arun
Fishbourne	2,325	3.61	Chichester Municipal Borough	Chichester
Fittleworth	978	15.14	Petworth Rural District	Chichester
Ford	1,690	4.08	Chichester Rural District	Arun
Fulking	303	6.28	Cuckfield Rural District	Mid Sussex
Funtington	1,549	20.02	Chichester Rural District	Chichester
Graffham	516	11.81	Midhurst Rural District	Chichester
Harting	1,451	32.16	Midhurst Rural District	Chichester
Hassocks	7,667	10.88	Cuckfield Rural District	Mid Sussex
Haywards Heath (town)	27,057	9.74	Cuckfield Urban District	Mid Sussex
Henfield	5,349	17.29	Chanctonbury Rural District	Horsham
Heyshott	270	9.38	Midhurst Rural District	Chichester
Horsham	30,113	11.72	Horsham Urban District	Horsham
Horsted Keynes	1,586	15.81	Cuckfield Rural District	Mid Sussex
Houghton	153	12.59	Worthing Rural District	Arun
Hunston	1,257	4.62	Chichester Rural District	Chichester
Hurstpierpoint and Sayers Common	7,112	20.30	Cuckfield Rural District	Mid Sussex
Itchingfield	1,565	10.91	Horsham Rural District	Horsham
Kingston	625	1.72	Worthing Rural District	Arun
Kirdford	1,063	20.09	Petworth Rural District	Chichester
Lancing	18,810	14.14	Worthing Rural District	Adur
Lavant	1,656	16.53	Chichester Rural District	Chichester
Linch			Midhurst Rural District	Chichester
Linchmere	2,392	9.03	Midhurst Rural District	Chichester
Lindfield	5,836	2.24	Cuckfield Urban District	Mid Sussex
Lindfield Rural	2,633	19.81	Cuckfield Rural District	Mid Sussex
Littlehampton (town)	27,795	10.07	Littlehampton Urban District	Arun
Lodsworth	672	12.46	Midhurst Rural District	Chichester
Lower Beeding	1,022	18.45	Horsham Rural District	Horsham
Loxwood	1,480	18.24	Petworth Rural District	Chichester
Lurgashall	609	20.97	Midhurst Rural District	Chichester
Lyminster and Crossbush	369	5.81	Worthing Rural District	Arun
Madehurst	120	7.66	Chichester Rural District	Arun
Marden			Chichester Rural District	Chichester
Middleton on Sea	5,077	3.54	Chichester Rural District	Arun
Midhurst (town)	4,914	3.33	Midhurst Rural District	Chichester
Milland	891	23.78	Midhurst Rural District	Chichester
Newtimber			Cuckfield Rural District	Mid Sussex
North Horsham	21,981	10.95	Horsham Rural District Horsham Urban District	Horsham
North Mundham	1,201	10.21	Chichester Rural District	Chichester
Northchapel	797	13.62	Petworth Rural District	Chichester
Nuthurst	1,777	16.97	Horsham Rural District	Horsham
Oving	1,051	13.97	Chichester Rural District	Chichester
Pagham	5,941	9.88	Chichester Rural District	Arun
Parham	224	15.76	Chanctonbury Rural District	Horsham
Patching	259	8.46	Worthing Rural District	Arun
Petworth (town)	3,027	26.90	Petworth Rural District	Chichester
Plaistow	1,898	21.02	Petworth Rural District	Chichester
Poling	174	3.20	Worthing Rural District	Arun
Poynings	432	13.60	Cuckfield Rural District	Mid Sussex
Pulborough	5,206	20.90	Chanctonbury Rural District	Horsham
Pyecombe	237	8.87	Cuckfield Rural District	Mid Sussex
Rogate	1,556	23.16	Midhurst Rural District	Chichester
Rudgwick	2,722	24.69	Horsham Rural District	Horsham
Rusper	1,635	25.88	Horsham Rural District	Horsham
Rustington	13,883	3.72	Littlehampton Urban DistrictWorthing Rural District	Arun
Selsey (town)	10,737	9.66	Chichester Rural District	Chichester
Shermanbury	542	7.74	Chanctonbury Rural District	Horsham
Shipley	1,147	31.26	Horsham Rural District	Horsham
Sidlesham	1,171	16.79	Chichester Rural District	Chichester
Singleton	480	16.01	Chichester Rural District	Chichester
Slaugham	2,769	24.32	Cuckfield Rural District	Mid Sussex
Slindon	595	12.86	Chichester Rural District	Arun
Slinfold	2,055	16.94	Horsham Rural District	Horsham
Sompting	8,561	10.35	Worthing Rural District	Adur
South Stoke			Worthing Rural District	Arun
Southbourne	6,265	8.70	Chichester Rural District	Chichester
Southwater	10,730	14.00	Horsham Rural District	Horsham
Stedham with Iping	767	10.81	Midhurst Rural District	Chichester
Steyning	5,990	15.69	Chanctonbury Rural District	Horsham
Stopham			Petworth Rural District	Chichester
Storrington and Sullington	6,966	20.83	Chanctonbury Rural District	Horsham
Stoughton	659	28.97	Chichester Rural District	Chichester
Sutton	425	17.88	Petworth Rural District	Chichester
Tangmere	2,625	4.67	Chichester Rural District	Chichester
Thakeham	1,816	11.99	Chanctonbury Rural District	Horsham
Tillington	524	14.16	Midhurst Rural District	Chichester
Trotton with Chithurst	329	7.68	Midhurst Rural District	Chichester
Turners Hill	1,919	13.90	Cuckfield Rural District	Mid Sussex
Twineham	306	7.84	Cuckfield Rural District	Mid Sussex
Upper Beeding	3,763	18.71	Chanctonbury Rural District	Horsham
Upwaltham			Chichester Rural District	Chichester
Walberton	2,174	10.44	Chichester Rural District	Arun
Warnham	2,068	19.80	Horsham Rural District	Horsham
Warningcamp	156	3.76	Worthing Rural District	Arun
Washington	1,867	12.77	Chanctonbury Rural District	Horsham
West Chiltington	3,377	17.33	Chanctonbury Rural District	Horsham
West Dean	481	24.84	Chichester Rural District	Chichester
West Grinstead	3,054	25.81	Horsham Rural District	Horsham
West Hoathly	2,181	21.39	Cuckfield Rural District	Mid Sussex
West Itchenor	289	1.69	Chichester Rural District	Chichester
West Lavington	276	2.45	Midhurst Rural District	Chichester
West Thorney	1,183	4.90	Chichester Rural District	Chichester
West Wittering	2,700	10.54	Chichester Rural District	Chichester
Westbourne	2,309	7.47	Chichester Rural District	Chichester
Westhampnett	709	8.87	Chichester Rural District	Chichester
Wisborough Green	1,414	17.57	Petworth Rural District	Chichester
Wiston	219	13.60	Chanctonbury Rural District	Horsham
Woodmancote	543	8.49	Chanctonbury Rural District	Horsham
Woolbeding with Redford	147	7.29	Midhurst Rural District	Chichester
Worth	10,378	19.95	Cuckfield Rural District	Mid Sussex
Yapton	3,571	7.91	Chichester Rural District	Arun

== See also ==
- List of civil parishes in England
