= County Hall, Chichester =

County building in Chichester, West Sussex, England

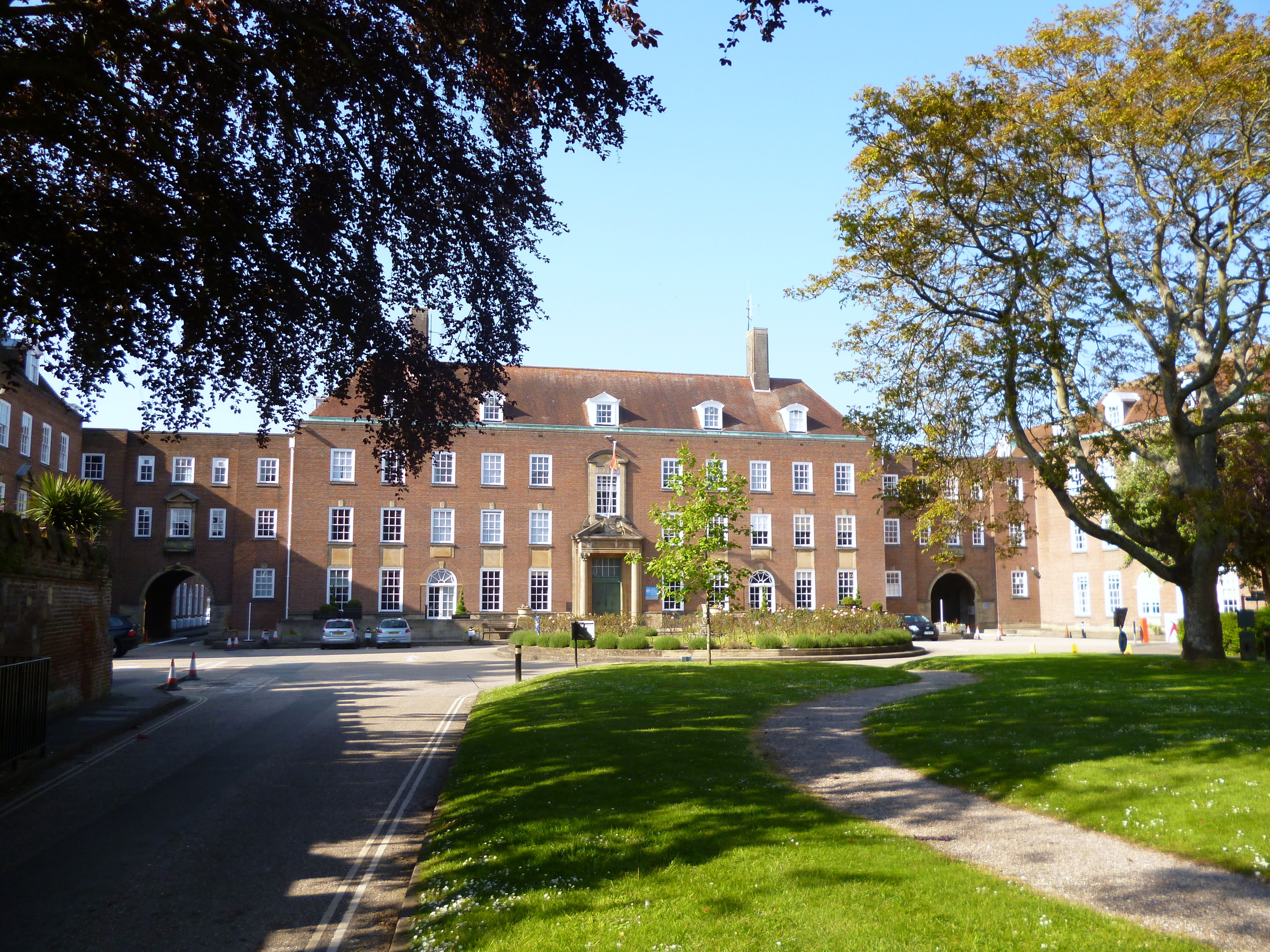
- County Hall

- Location within West Sussex

General information
- Architectural style: Georgian Revival style
- Location: West Street, Chichester, West Sussex, PO19 1RQ, United Kingdom
- Coordinates: 50.8379°N 0.7828°W
- Completed: 1933

Design and construction
- Architect: Cecil G Stillman

County Hall is a municipal facility at West Street in Chichester, West Sussex. It is the headquarters of West Sussex County Council.

== History ==
Following the implementation of the Local Government Act 1888, which established county councils in every county, West Sussex County Council initially met at the Council House, Chichester. From 1890 until 1916 meetings were held alternately at the Horsham Town Hall and the Council House in Chichester, with the council's main offices also being divided between Chichester and Horsham.

The county council decided to find a location where it could consolidate its offices and meeting place. In 1916 it bought a large seventeenth century house with extensive grounds called Wren House (since renamed Edes House) in West Street in Chichester. Wren House was purchased with the intention of later building a new headquarters for the county council in the grounds, once the First World War was over and finances allowed.

The new county hall in the grounds of Wren House was designed by Cecil G Stillman, the County Architect, in the Georgian Revival style, and was built between 1933 and 1936. The design involved a symmetrical main frontage with twenty-one bays facing onto a central courtyard; the central section of eleven bays, which projected slightly forward, featured a doorway on the ground floor flanked by Ionic order columns supporting an entablature with a pediment above; there was a tall round-headed window between the first and second floors with an open round-headed pediment above; the end sections of the main frontage contained arched carriageways to permit vehicle access to the rear of the site and there were side wings beyond that. Internally, the principal room was the council chamber.

The main building was altered in the 1960s to accommodate an emergency control centre in case of a nuclear attack. The county council also acquired a Victorian mansion known as "The Grange" at that time: the old house, which was located to the north east of the main building, was demolished and replaced by a modern office block also known as "The Grange". Another modern facility known as "Northleigh House" was built just south of The Grange in 1974.

The Princess Royal attended a reception for the Council of Occupational Therapists in County Hall on 19 April 2010 and a major programme of refurbishment works to convert the building into an open-plan working environment was completed in 2011.
