= Worthing Rural District =

Former local government area of West Sussex, England

Coordinates: 50.85191°N 0.48065°W

- Area
  - 1951: 29,809 acres (120.63 km^{2})
  - 1961: 29,809 acres (120.63 km^{2})
- Population
  - 1931: 14,005
  - 1939: 33,108
  - 1961: 38,426
- Density
  - 1931: 0.47 inhabitants per acre (120/km^{2})
  - 1939: 1.11 inhabitants per acre (270/km^{2})
  - 1961: 1.29 inhabitants per acre (320/km^{2})
- History
  - Origin: East Preston Rural District, Steyning Rural District, Thakeham Rural District
  - Created: 1933
  - Abolished: 1974
  - Succeeded by: Adur district and Arun district
- Status: Rural district
  - HQ: 15 Mill Road, West Worthing, Worthing

Worthing Rural District was a rural district in West Sussex, England from 1933 to 1974. It comprised an area to the north, west and east, but did not include the borough of Worthing. Its area encompassed the land in southern Sussex between the Rivers Adur and Arun, with the exception of Arundel, Littlehampton and Worthing itself. The rural district had its council offices at 15 Mill Road, West Worthing, Worthing.

The district was created as the successor to parts of East Preston Rural District, Steyning West Rural District and Thakeham Rural District.

It consisted of seventeen civil parishes: Angmering, Burpham, Clapham, Coombes, East Preston, Ferring, Findon, Houghton, Kingston, Lancing, Lyminster, Patching, Poling, Rustington, Sompting, South Stoke and Warningcamp.

The rural district was abolished by the Local Government Act 1972 in 1974. Its territory was split between the Adur district and the Arun district, with the parishes of Coombes, Lancing and Sompting going to the former and the others going to the latter.

== See also ==
- History of local government in Sussex
- Worthing Borough Council
- West Sussex County Council
