= Hip roof =

Type of roof where all sides slope downward to the walls

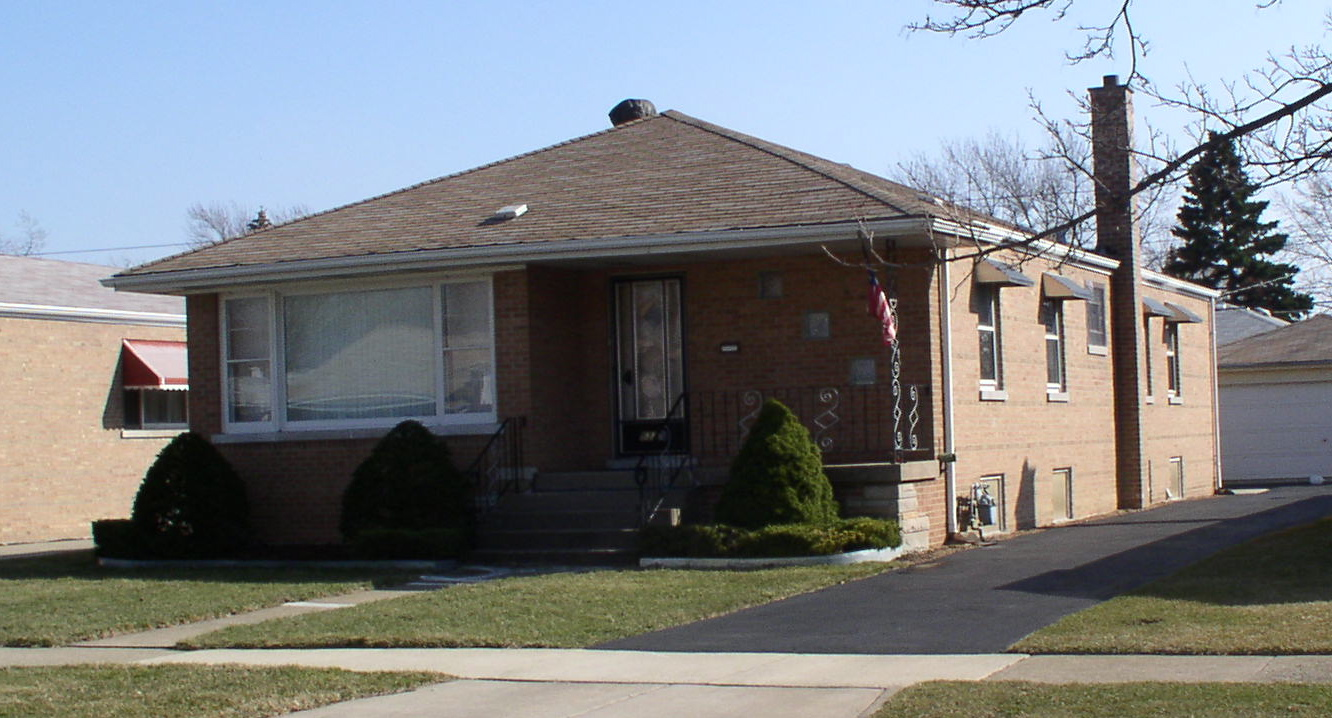
A raised bungalow in Chicago with a hipped roof

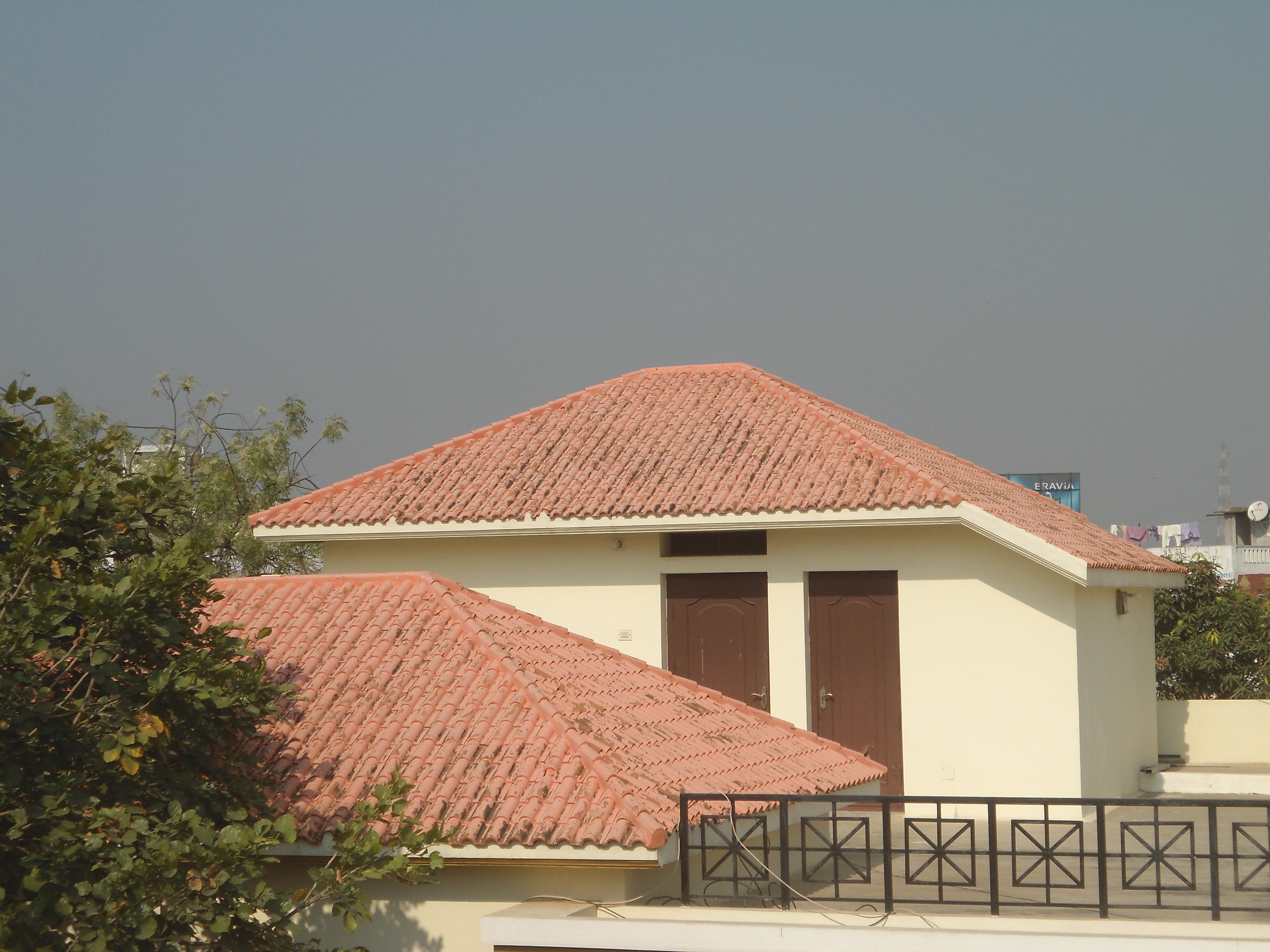
A hip-roof type house in Khammam city, India

A hip roof, hip-roof or hipped roof, is a type of roof where all sides slope downward to the walls — thus, a hipped roof has no gables or other vertical sides to the roof. Variants of hipped roofs include the Simple Hip Roof (most common, four slopes meeting at a central ridge), Pyramid Hip Roof (a square base where all four triangular sides meet at a single peak), Cross Hip Roof (with multiple intersecting ridges for L- or T-shaped buildings), and Half Hip Roof (where gable ends are partially "clipped" with a small hip section). Other variations include the Dutch Gable Roof (a gable section on top of a hip roof), the Mansard Roof (a hip roof with two different pitches on each side), and the Hip-and-Valley Roof (often a blend for complex structures).

A square hip roof is shaped like a pyramid. Hip roofs on houses may have two triangular sides and two trapezoidal ones. A hip roof on a rectangular plan has four faces. They are almost always at the same pitch or slope, which makes them symmetrical about the centerlines. Hip roofs often have a consistent level fascia, meaning that a gutter can be fitted all around. Hip roofs often have dormer slanted sides.

== Construction ==
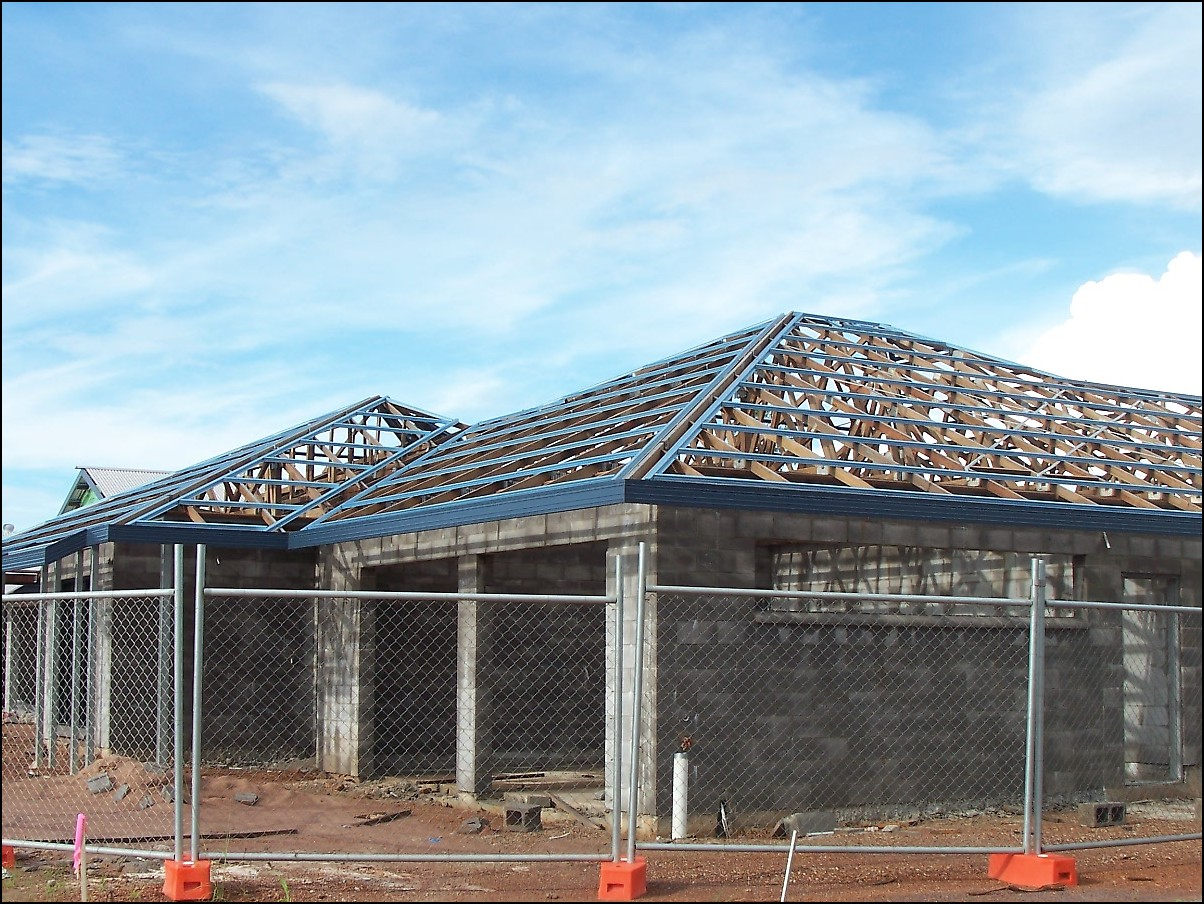
A hip roof construction in Northern Australia showing multinail truss construction. The blue pieces are roll-formed metal roof battens or purlins

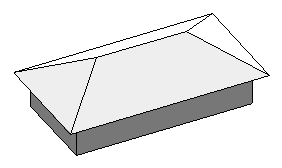
Common hip roof on a rectangular plan with pitches rising to a ridge.

"Pavilion" hip roof on a square plan with pitches rising to a peak.

Hip roofs can be constructed on a wide variety of plan shapes. Each ridge is central over the rectangle of the building below it. The triangular faces of the roof are called the hip ends, and they are bounded by the hips themselves. The "hips" and hip rafters sit on an external corner of the building and rise to the ridge. Where the building has an internal corner, a valley makes the join between the sloping surfaces (and is underlain by a valley rafter). Hip roofs have the advantage of giving a compact, solid appearance to a structure. The roof pitch (slope) may vary.

== Use ==
In modern domestic architecture, hip roofs are commonly seen in bungalows and cottages, and have been integral to styles such as the American Foursquare. However, they have been used in many styles of architecture and in a wide array of structures.

== Advantages and disadvantages ==
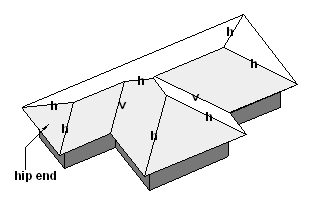
A hip roof on a varied plan, "h" denotes a hip, "v" denotes a valley

A hip roof is self-bracing, requiring less diagonal bracing than a gable roof. Hip roofs are thus much more resistant to wind damage than gable roofs. Hip roofs have no large, flat, or slab-sided ends to catch wind and are inherently much more stable than gable roofs. However, for a hurricane region, the roof also has to be steep-sloped; at least 35 degrees from horizontal or steeper in slope is preferred. When wind flows over a shallow sloped hip roof, the roof can behave like an airplane wing. Lift is then created on the leeward side. The flatter the roof, the more likely this is to happen. A steeper pitched hip roof tends to cause the wind to stall as it goes over the roof, breaking up the effect. If the roof slopes are less than 35 degrees from horizontal, the roof is subject to uplift. Greater than 35 degrees, and not only does wind blowing over it encounter a stalling effect, but the roof is actually held down on the wall plate by the wind pressure.

A disadvantage of a hip roof, compared with a gable roof on the same plan, is that there is less room inside the roof space; access is more difficult for maintenance; hip roofs are harder to ventilate; and there is not a gable with a window for natural light. Elegant, organic additions are relatively difficult to make on houses with hip roofs.

== Variants ==
=== Mansard roof ===
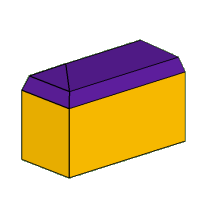
Mansard roof

A mansard roof is a variation on a hip roof, with two different roof angles, the lower one much steeper than the upper.

=== Gablet roof or Dutch gable ===
Gablet roof

Another variation is the gablet (UK terminology) or Dutch gable roof (U.S. and Australasian terminology), which has a hip with a small gable (the gablet) above it. This type simplifies the construction of the roof; no girder trusses are required, but it still has level walls and consistent eaves.

The East Asian hip-and-gable roof is similar in concept to the gablet roof.

=== Half-hip roof ===
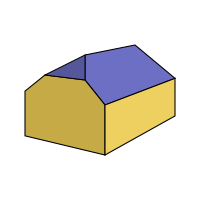
Half-hip roof

A half-hip, clipped-gable or jerkinhead roof has a gable, but the upper point of the gable is replaced by a small hip, squaring off the top of the gable. The lower edge of the half-hip may have a gutter that leads back on to the remainder of the roof on one or both sides. Both the gablet roof and the half-hipped roof are intermediate between the gabled and fully hipped types: the gablet roof has a gable above a hip, while a half-hipped roof has a hip above a gable.

Half-hipped roofs are common in England, Denmark, Germany and especially in Austria and Slovenia. They are also typical of traditional timber-frame buildings in the Wealden area of South East England.

Half-hip roofs are sometimes referred to as "Dutch hip", but this term is easily confused with "Dutch gable".

=== Pavilion roof ===
A roof with equally hipped pitches on a square or regular polygonal plan having a pyramidal or almost pyramidal form. Low variants are typically found topping gazebos and other pavilion structures. Steep tower or church tower variants are known as pyramid roofs.

=== Rhenish helm or Helm roof ===
A pointed roof seen on a spire or a tower, oriented so that it has four gable ends. See the Church of St Mary the Blessed Virgin, Sompting, in England; or Speyer Cathedral and Limburg Cathedral in Germany.

=== Tented roof ===
A tented roof is a type of polygonal hipped roof with steeply pitched slopes rising to a peak or intersection.

== See also ==
- List of roof shapes
- Domestic roof construction
- Finial, or hip-knob
