= Sompting Abbotts Preparatory School =

Coordinates: 50.83959°N 0.34990°W

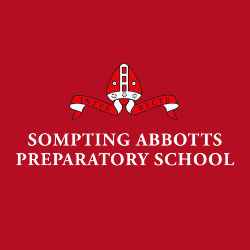
- Sompting Abbotts Crest

Location
- Church Lane; Sompting; West Sussex, BN15 0AZ; United Kingdom

Information
- Type: Independent School
- Motto: Intus recte (Inward righteousness)
- Religious affiliation: Church of England
- Established: 1921
- Founder: AC Rutherford
- Closed: 2026
- Local authority: West Sussex County Council
- Department for Education URN: 126121 Tables
- Principal: David Sinclair
- Head teacher: Chris Gunn
- Gender: Mixed
- Age: 2 to 13
- Website: www.somptingabbotts.com

Sompting Abbotts Preparatory School was a historic West Sussex independent school in Sompting, near Worthing and Steyning, situated in 30 acres of parkland, including woodland, chalk grassland slopes and a pond.

Founded in 1921 as a boys' boarding school, by the time of its closure in 2026 it had become a non-selective day school for both sexes aged 2 to 13. It was a member of the Independent Association of Preparatory Schools (IAPS). The final headmaster was Chris Gunn and the principal was Patricia Sinclair. The school has strong links with the Church of St Mary the Blessed Virgin and holds its annual Harvest Festival and Christmas carol services there.

== Sompting Abbotts House ==
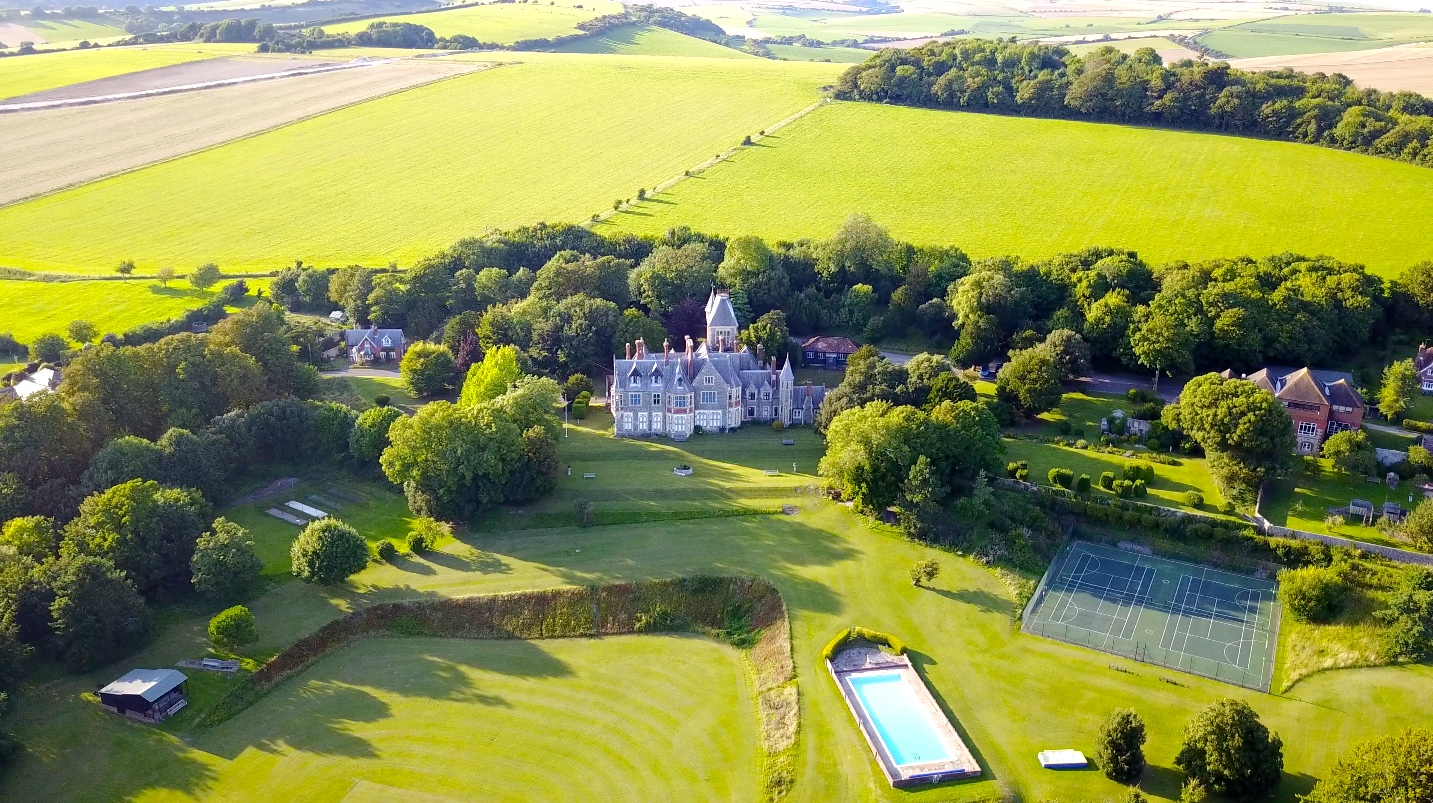
Aerial view

The main school was housed in Sompting Abbotts House which was originally called Sompting Manor. Sompting Abbotts and the surrounding estate is believed to have been inhabited since the Neolithic period. The line of the original Chichester–Brighton Roman road runs through the school parkland.

Following the dissolution of the monasteries by Henry VIII, Sompting Manor was granted in 1540 to Thomas Howard, Duke of Norfolk.

In 1814, Princess Caroline, wife of the Prince of Wales (later King George IV), stayed at the manor on one of her royal visits to Worthing. It followed a stay in the town during her troubled marriage. The next day, she sailed to France from Lancing.

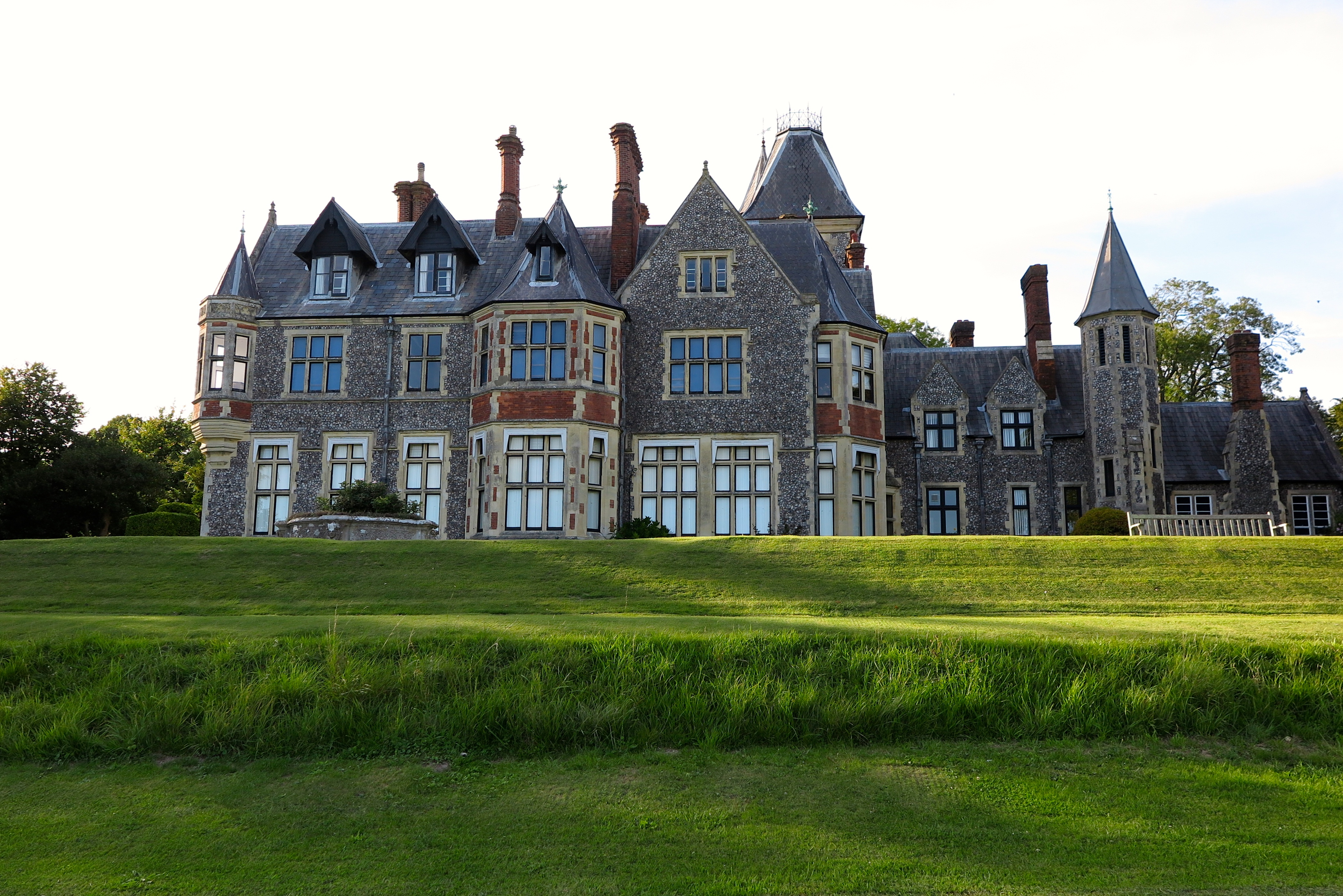
view from south

The manor, along with its 1,500-acre (610-hectare) estate passed to Reverend P.G. Croft in 1830. At this time, the manor contained a house with a five-bay symmetrical south front.

Sompting Abbotts House was built in 1856 for Rev. Croft's son, Henry. It was designed by the architect Philip Charles Hardwick (later to design the great hall of Euston railway station) in Neo-Gothic style for the then owner Henry Croft to replace Sompting Manor. Hardwick's design was completed in 1856. The 1875 Ordnance Survey map shows the ground to the east and south with sweeping lawns and groups of trees which remain today. Sompting Abbotts House features high slate roofs, lancet casement windows, stone mullions, octagonal towers, spiral staircases and a castellated parapet. The house is a Grade II listed building.

== School history ==
The school was founded following World War I by the Rutherford family in 1921. Mr. A.C. Rutherford opened Sompting Abbotts House as a boys' boarding school in 1921, which lasted until the outbreak of World War II in 1939, when it was temporary closed. The school was evacuated to Cabalva Hall, Wales, and the Army took control of the house and grounds.

The Sinclair family acquired the premises in 1946, following the war, and reopened it as a boy's boarding school, though it had become dilapidated in the interim. The headmaster, Nigel Sinclair, later wrote "It was a depressing sight. All the playing fields and lawns were an unrecognisable overgrown jungle of grass and bushes," adding that most windows had been broken." In 2018, a wartime letter to a past pupil, dated 1939, was discovered under the floorboards of a dormitory. The school traced its original owner to Australia. Over the years, the school evolved. It became co-educational in 1998 and closed its boarding facilities in 2008. In total, it has had seven headmasters: John Hammond, George Rutherford, Nigel Sinclair, Richard Johnson, Timothy Sinclair. and Stuart Douch. The last head was Chris Gunn.

The school closed in August 2026, citing financial pressures.

== Curriculum ==
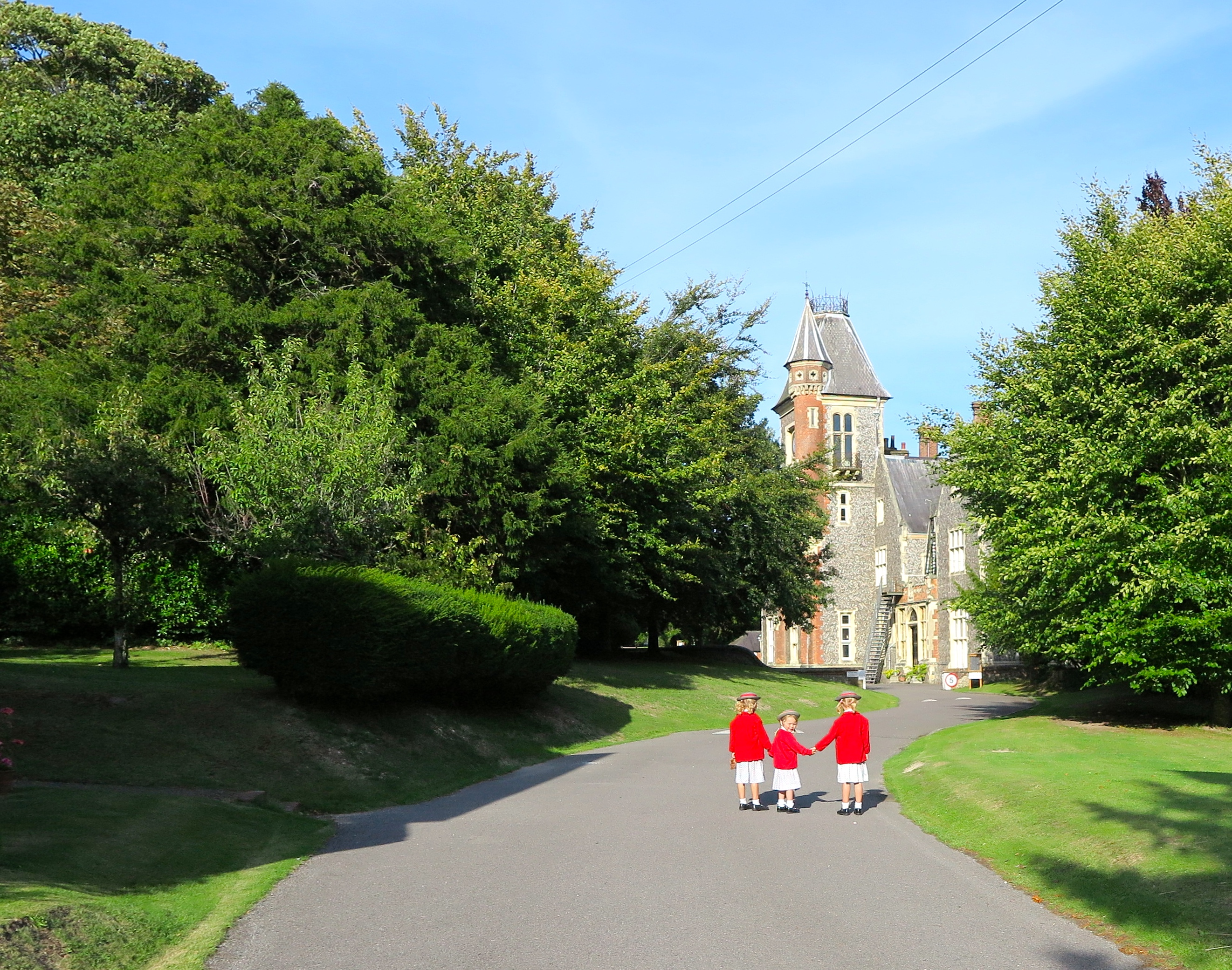
Entrance to Sompting Abbotts Preparatory School

The school curriculum prepared children for the Common Entrance Examination (CEE) and other scholarship examinations to public senior schools.

== Notable alumni ==
- Alex Preston - Author
- Samuel Preston - Singer
- Chris Saunders - Cricketer
