= Henry Caldwell Cook =

British educator

- Born: 1886; Liverpool
- Died: 1939 (aged 52–53)
- Occupation: Teacher
- Known for: Youth play as study (The Play Way)

Henry Caldwell Cook (1886–1939) was a British educator known for his book The Play Way, which contended that doing was a better learning method than reading and listening, and that youth study through play.

== Early life and career ==
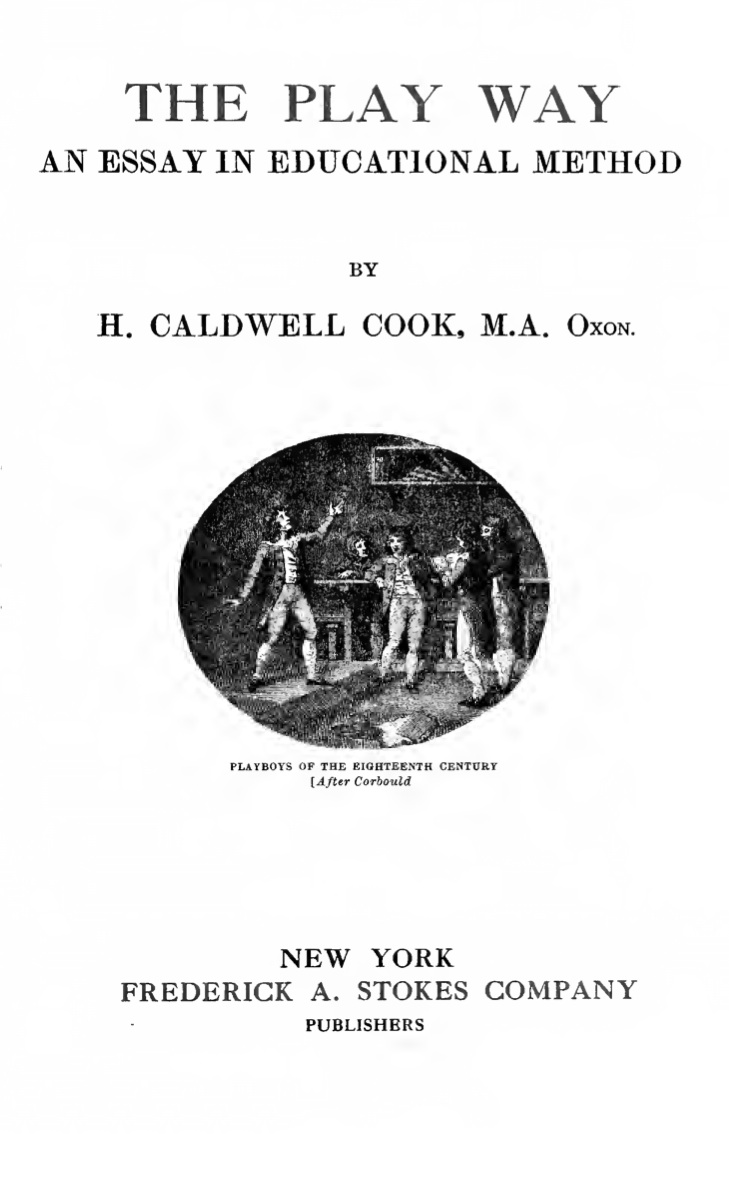
The Play Way 1919 edition title page

Henry Caldwell Cook was born in Liverpool in 1886. He attended a St. John's Wood prep school, Highgate School in London, and Lincoln College in Oxford. He received second class honours from the school of English language and literature in 1909 and an Oxford Diploma in Education with distinction in 1911.

Caldwell Cook served as the English master at the Perse School in Cambridge from 1911 to 1915 and 1919–1933, and served his country with the Artists Rifles division in France. During this time, he wrote Littleman's Book of Courtesy (1914) and The Play Way, an Essay in Educational Method (1917), his magnum opus. Caldwell Cook saw the current schooling system to impede "true education". He used drama to teach English, building a room, called 'the Mummery', in his school based on an Elizabethan theatre, and students improvised plays based on dramatic literature. This idea had been used and publicised by Harriet Finlay-Johnson. He called this method the "play-way". The Play Way, the book, argued that learning came from experience doing instead of from listening and reading: "The natural means of study in youth is play." The claim was debated for a generation. The book began as articles for The New Age in 1914 destined for the "Papers for the Present" series, but became a book reflecting on his experience at Perse. A 1922 unpublished Board of Education report made the recommendation to not support grants for his program or its imitators.

In 1939, he died a bachelor "in comparative obscurity".
