= Council House, Chichester =

Municipal building in West Sussex, England

The Council House, Chichester
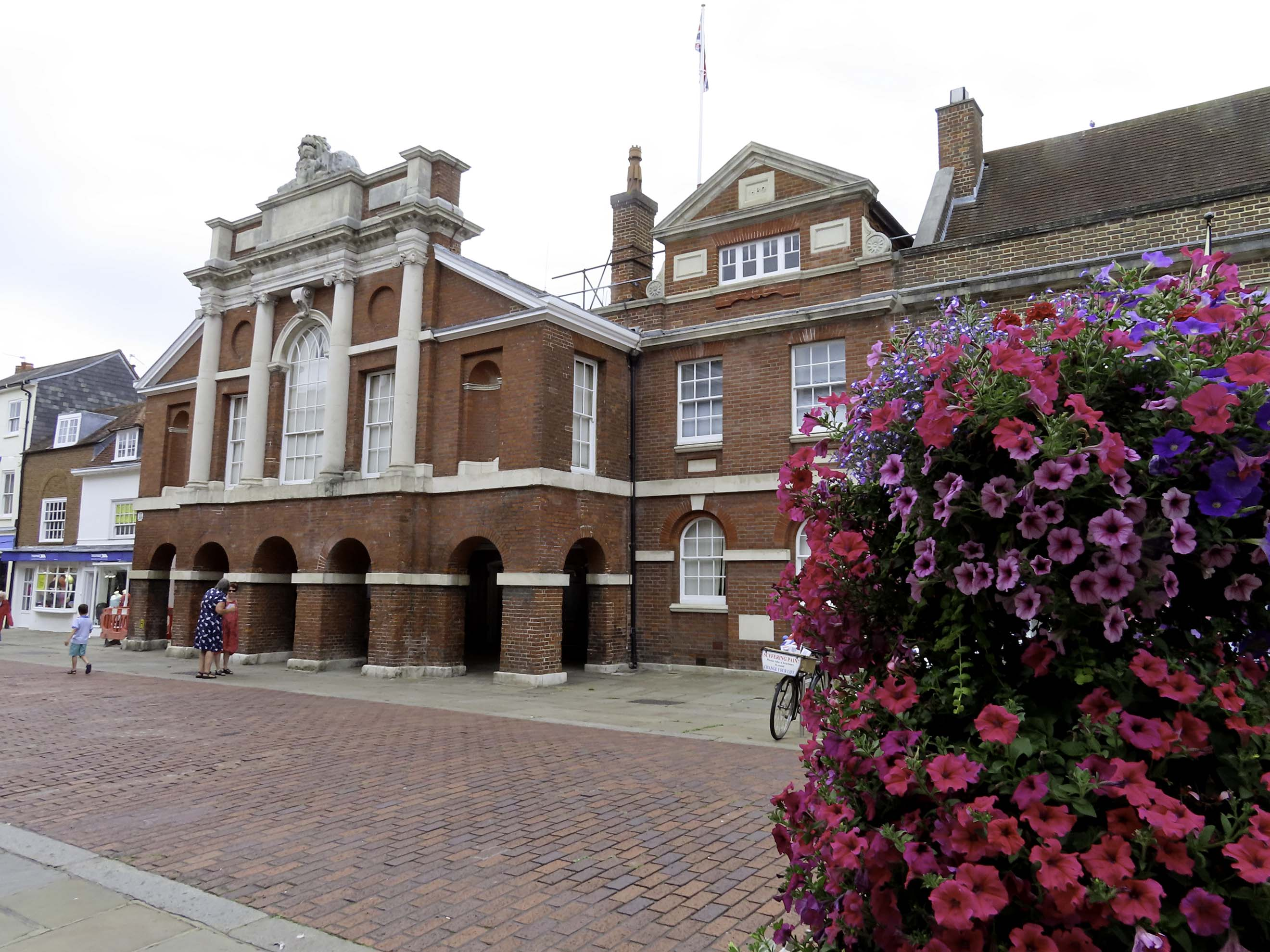
- The Council House in 2019

- Location within Chichester city centre

General information
- Architectural style: Palladian
- Location: North Street, Chichester, West Sussex, England
- Coordinates: 50.8371°N 0.7775°W
- Year built: 1731

Design and construction
- Architects: Roger Morris and James Wyatt

Listed Building – Grade II*
- Official name: The Council Chamber and Assembly Room
- Designated: 5 July 1950
- Reference no.: 1354331

The Council House is a municipal building on North Street in Chichester, West Sussex, England. It is a Grade II* listed building.

== History ==
The building was commissioned as successor to the Chichester Guildhall, where meetings of Chichester City Council had been held since the mid-16th century. The new building, which was designed by Roger Morris in the Palladian style, was completed in 1731. It was funded by public subscription and a significant donor was Charles Lennox, 2nd Duke of Richmond. The building was extended at the rear, by local builder Thomas Andrews, to create the assembly rooms which were designed as a double cube with an apse at the east end by James Wyatt and completed in October 1783.

A large Purbeck Marble stone, sometimes known as "the Purbeck Stone", which had been unearthed during the construction of the building and which is thought to have formed part of a Roman temple, was subsequently embedded into the west wall of the complex. It bears an inscription which suggests that the temple was dedicated to the gods Neptune and Minerva on the orders of Tiberius Claudius Cogidubnus, a 1st-century king of the Regni or Regnenses tribe.

In 1789 William Pitt, the then Prime Minister, held a meeting with Charles Lennox, 3rd Duke of Richmond in the assembly rooms and, in 1805, a function was held there to celebrate the Battle of Trafalgar. In 1810 the quaker Joseph Lancaster gave a lecture there which inspired the foundation of the Lancastrian School in Chichester. Functions were also held in the assembly rooms to celebrate the Coronation of William IV and Adelaide in September 1831 and the enactment of the Reform Bill in June 1832. The Italian violinist, Niccolò Paganini, performed in the assembly rooms during his tour of Britain in 1832 and the virtuoso pianist, Franz Liszt, gave two concerts there in 1840. The complex was extended to the south in 1880.

The building was the first meeting place of West Sussex County Council when it was established in 1889. Meetings of the county council were then held alternately at the Council House and at Horsham Town Hall from 1890 until the council purchased Edes House in Chichester in 1916 to serve as its headquarters.

The ante room to the assembly rooms contains a replica of the bust of Charles I by Hubert Le Sueur, the original of which is in the Pallant House Gallery, as well a cabinet containing a collection of the belongings of Vice-Admiral Sir George Murray, who served with Vice-Admiral Lord Nelson at the Battle of Copenhagen in April 1801 and went on to be Mayor of Chichester in 1815. There is also a list of people who have received the freedom of the City of Chichester who include the Duke of Richmond and Gordon in 2008, The Very Reverend Nicholas Frayling, Dean of Chichester in 2013 and the astronaut, Tim Peake in 2018.

Meetings of Chichester City Council continue to be held in the Council House. The assembly rooms, which can accommodate 180 people seated, continue to be used for wedding receptions and similar functions.

== See also ==
- Grade II* listed buildings in West Sussex
