= West Sussex County Council =

British administrative authority

- Coat of arms

- Council logo

Type
- Type: Non-metropolitan county

Leadership
- Chair: Donna Johnson, Local Alliance since 22 May 2026
- Leader: Jay Mercer, Liberal Democrat since 22 May 2026
- Chief Executive: Leigh Whitehouse since 2024

Structure
- Seats: 70 councillors
- Political groups: Administration (36) Liberal Democrat (23) Green (7) Labour (5) Local Alliance (1) Other parties (34) Reform UK (23) Conservative (11)
- Length of term: 4 years

Elections
- Voting system: First past the post
- Last election: 7 May 2026
- Next election: 2029

Meeting place
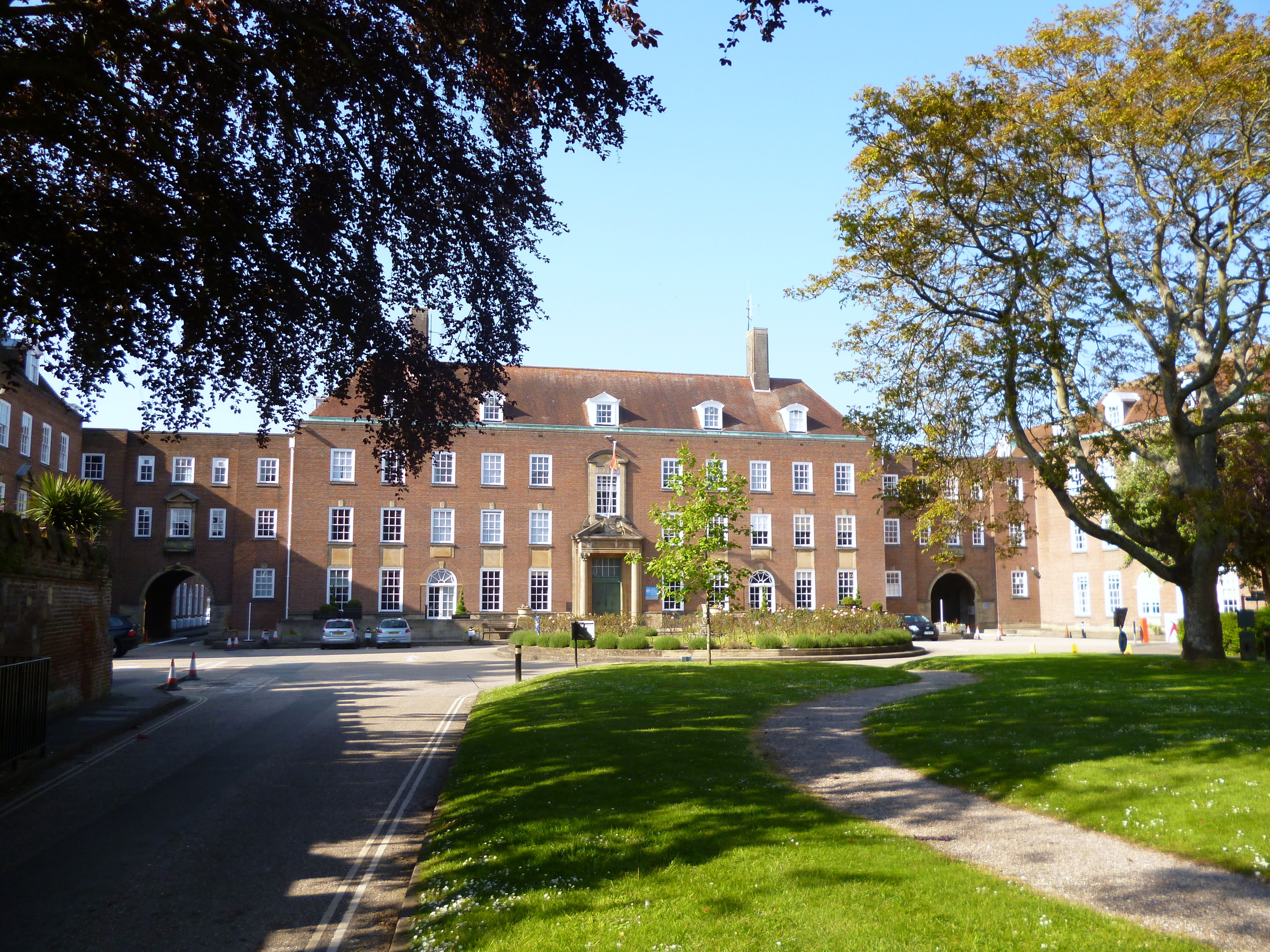
- County Hall, West Street, Chichester, PO19 1RQ

Website
- www.westsussex.gov.uk

West Sussex County Council is the upper tier local authority for the non-metropolitan county of West Sussex in England.

The county also contains seven district and borough councils, and 158 town, parish and neighbourhood councils. The county council has 70 elected councillors. The chief executive and directors are responsible for the day-to-day running of the council.

The council went under no overall control at the 2026 election, since when it has been run by a Liberal Democrat-led coaltion which also includes the Green Party, Labour, and the Local Alliance. The council is based at County Hall, Chichester.

In 2026 the council became a member of the Sussex and Brighton Strategic Authority.

== History ==
Sussex was historically divided into six sub-divisions known as rapes. From the 12th century the practice arose of holding the quarter sessions separately for the three eastern rapes and the three western rapes, with the courts for the western rapes of Arundel, Bramber and Chichester being held at Chichester. This position was formalised by the County of Sussex Act 1865, with the eastern and western divisions of Sussex treated as separate counties for the purposes of taxation, law enforcement, asylums and highways, whilst still deemed to be one county for the purposes of lieutenancy, militia and the coroner.

Elected county councils were established in 1889 under the Local Government Act 1888 to take over the administrative business of the quarter sessions. The eastern and western divisions of Sussex therefore became the administrative counties of East Sussex and West Sussex with separate county councils. The two administrative counties were still treated as one county for certain ceremonial purposes, notably sharing the Lord Lieutenant of Sussex and Sheriff of Sussex.

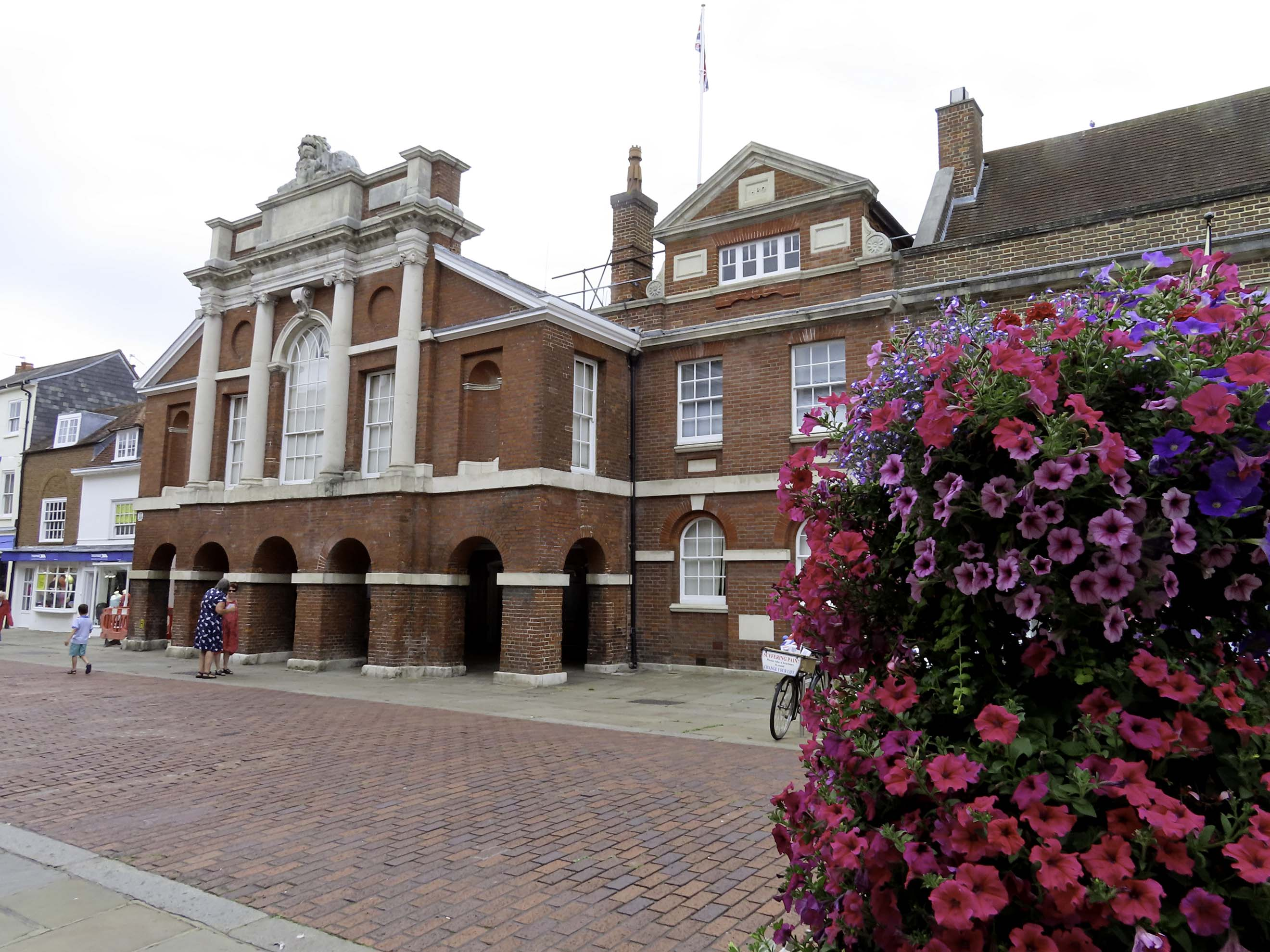
Council House, Chichester: Council's first meeting place.

The first elections were held in January 1889 and West Sussex County Council formally came into its powers on 1 April 1889. It held its first official meeting on 4 April 1889 at the Assembly Rooms in the Council House, Chichester. Charles Gordon-Lennox, 6th Duke of Richmond, a Conservative peer, was appointed the first chairman of the council.

Local government was reformed in 1974 under the Local Government Act 1972, which made West Sussex a non-metropolitan county. As part of the 1974 reforms it gained the Mid Sussex area (including Burgess Hill and Haywards Heath) from East Sussex and Gatwick Airport from Surrey. East Sussex and West Sussex also became separate ceremonial counties, with West Sussex gaining its own Lord Lieutenant and High Sheriff. The lower tier of local government was rearranged at the same time, with the county being divided into seven non-metropolitan districts.

In 2019, the council's Children Services department was described in a Children's Commissioner's report as "clearly failing across all domains in the strongest terms" leading to the resignation of then council leader Louise Goldsmith.

In 2026, the council became a member of the Sussex and Brighton Strategic Authority.

== Governance ==
West Sussex County Council provides county-level services, such as education, transport, strategic planning, emergency services, social services, public safety, the fire service and waste disposal. District-level services are provided by the area's seven district councils:

- Adur District Council
- Arun District Council
- Chichester District Council
- Crawley Borough Council
- Horsham District Council
- Mid Sussex District Council
- Worthing Borough Council

Much of the county is also covered by civil parishes, which form a third tier of local government.

=== Political control ===
The council has been under no overall control since 2026, having previously been under Conservative majority control since 1997. Following the 2026 election, a coalition of the Liberal Democrats, Green Party, Labour and Local Alliance formed to run the council, led by Liberal Democrat councillor Jay Mercer.

Political control of the council since the 1974 reforms has been as follows:

Party in control	Years
Conservative	1974–1993
No overall control	1993–1997
Conservative	1997–2026
No overall control	2026–present

=== Leadership ===
The leaders of the council since 1985 have been:

Councillor	Party	From	To
John Sheridan	Conservative	pre-1985	1989
Ian Elliott	Conservative	1989	1993
Amanda Clare	Liberal Democrats	1993	1997
Graham Forshaw	Conservative	1997	2001
Harold Hall	Conservative	2001	2003
Henry Smith	Conservative	2003	2010
Louise Goldsmith	Conservative	2010	Oct 2019
Paul Marshall	Conservative	18 Oct 2019	May 2026
Jay Mercer	Liberal Democrats	22 May 2026	

=== Composition ===
Following the 2026 election, the composition of the council was:

Party	Councillors
Liberal Democrats	23
Reform	23
Conservative	11
Green	7
Labour	5
Local Alliance	1
Total	70

== Elections ==
Since the last boundary changes in 2017 the county has been divided into 70 electoral divisions, each electing one councillor. Elections are held every four years.

== Premises ==
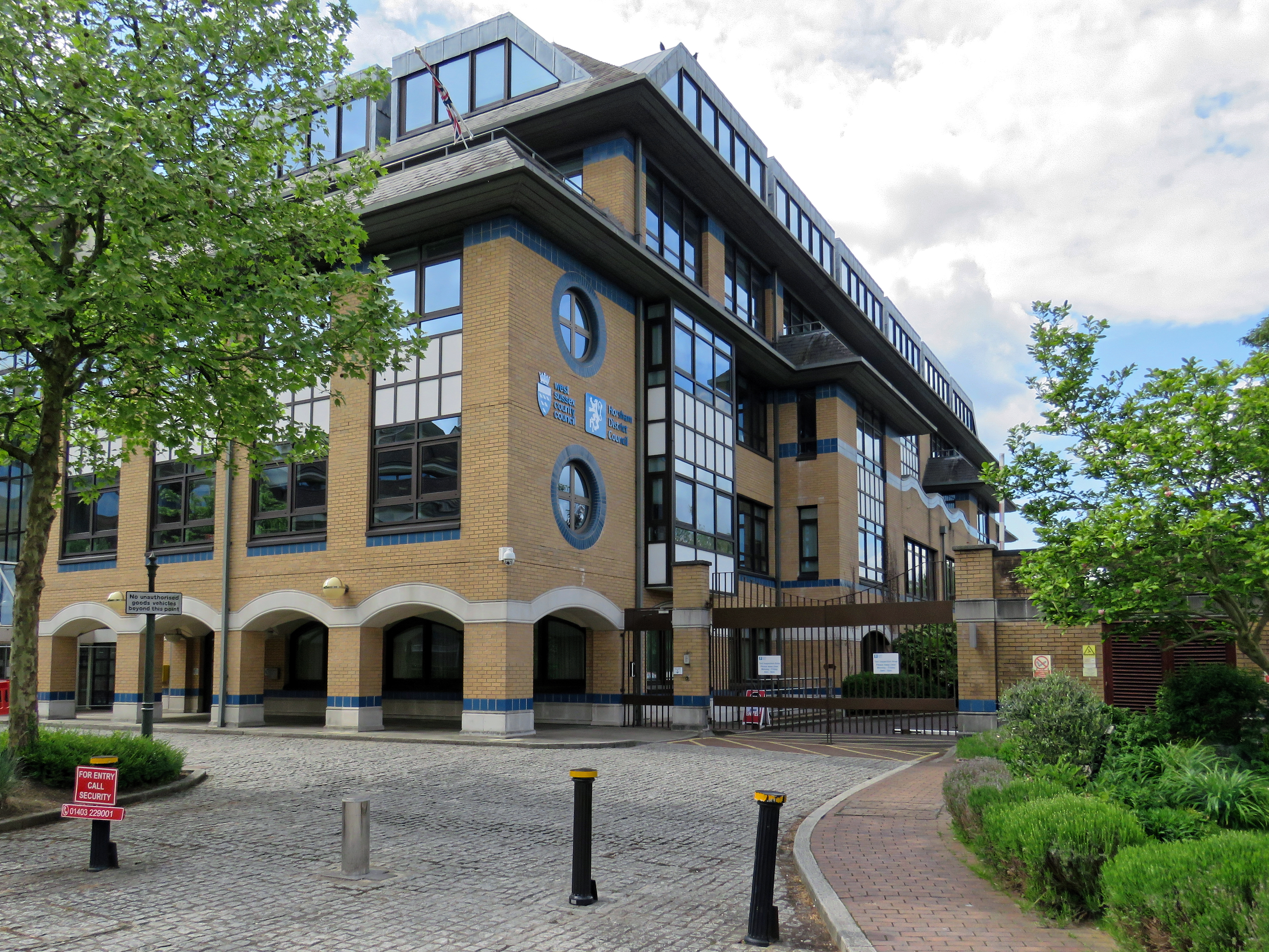
West Sussex County Council offices in Horsham

The council is based at County Hall, Chichester, which was purpose-built for the council between 1933 and 1936, with various extensions having been added to the complex since. It also has offices in Horsham and smaller area offices or customer service centres in Worthing, Bognor Regis and Crawley.

Having held its first few meetings at the Council House in Chichester, the council resolved in November 1889 to hold meetings alternately there and at Horsham Town Hall. This pattern continued until 1916 when the council bought a large seventeenth century house called Wren House (since renamed Edes House) on West Street in Chichester, converting it to be their meeting place and main offices. Wren House was purchased with a view to later building a new headquarters in the grounds of the house, which ultimately came to fruition when County Hall opened in 1936.

== Chairmen and chairwomen ==
Since 2011 most chairs of the council serve a two-year term, previously the term was more usually four years though before 1962 the position could essentially last almost a lifetime. Peter Mursell was the only individual to serve two non-consecutive terms, the second being after his 1969 knighthood. Cliff Robinson (died 2009) was the only chairman elected as a Liberal.

Chairs of West Sussex County Council in date order
Years	Chairperson
2021–2024	Peter John James Bradbury
2019–2021	Janet Elizabeth Duncton
2017–2019	Lionel Harvey Barnard
2015–2017	Patricia Annette Cooper Arculus
2013–2015	Amanda Jane Jupp
2011–2013	Michael William George Coleman
2001–2008	Margaret Delia Johnson
1997–2001	Ian Richard Wellesley Elliott
1993–1997	Clifford Robinson
1989–1993	Martyn Howard Long
1985–1989	Peter Geoffrey Shepherd
1981–1985	Christopher Stewart Buckle
1977–1981	Charles James Lucas
1974–1977	Edward John Frederick Green
1969–1974	Peter Mursell
1967–1969	Lancelot Lawrence Thwaytes
1962–1967	Peter Mursell
1946–1962	Herbert Shiner
1917–1946	Charles Wyndham, 3rd Baron Leconfield
1907–1917	Charles Gordon-Lennox, 7th Duke of Richmond
1903–1907	Edward Turnour, 5th Earl Winterton
1889–1903	Charles Gordon-Lennox, 6th Duke of Richmond

== See also ==
- List of civil parishes in West Sussex
