= Horsham Town Hall =

Municipal building in Horsham, West Sussex, England

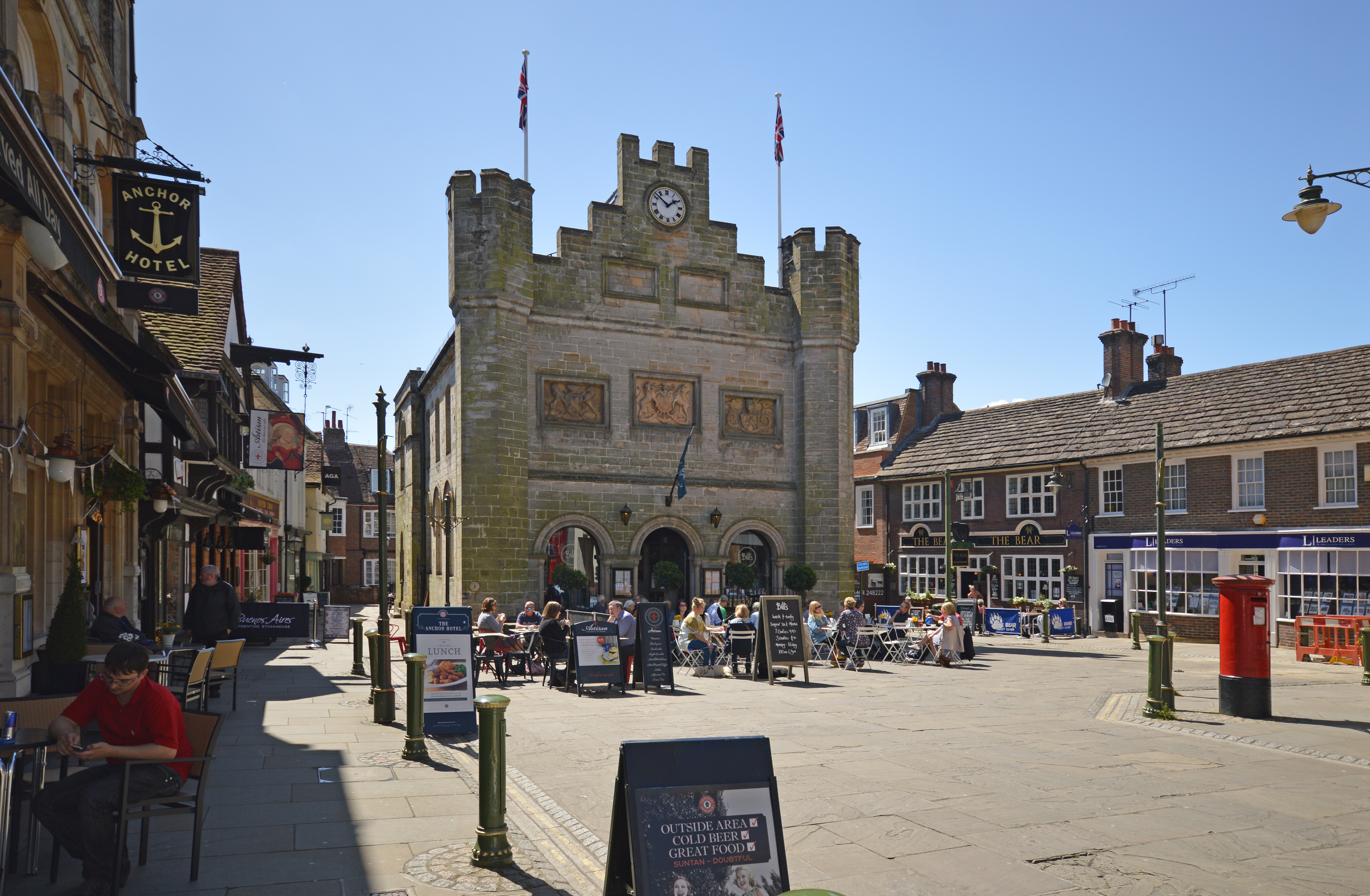
- The old Town Hall and market place

- Location within West Sussex
- 51°03′42″N 0°19′43″W
- Location: Horsham

History
- Built: 1812
- Rebuilt: 1888–9

Site notes
- Area: West Sussex

Listed Building – Grade II
- Official name: Town Hall
- Designated: 26 July 1974
- Reference no.: 1027519

Horsham Town Hall is a municipal building in the Market Square in Horsham, West Sussex. Established by the mid-17th century (and rebuilt several times since), it was used as a market house, a facility for dispensing justice and a meeting place for the local town council.

In 2013 the old Town Hall was converted into a restaurant. It is a Grade II listed building.

== History ==
The earliest mention of a building on the site was when a structure referred to as the "Market House", which contained a supply of arms, was seized during an uprising by a group of some 600 royalists in 1648 during the English Civil War; the revolt was put down by Sir Michael Livesey and his parliamentary troops.

In the first half of the 14th century the County court is known to have met periodically at Horsham, and the Court of Assize likewise; for the early years its venue is not known, but it was later fixed at the Town Hall. After 1660 the summer Assizes were usually held biennially at Horsham (with East Grinstead being used for the winter Assizes); Lewes often hosted the summer Assizes in the intervening years.

A new two-storey building of Portland stone, financed by Arthur Ingram, 6th Viscount of Irvine, was completed in 1721; it was topped by a hipped roof and had a central clock turret. The arcaded lower floor was used as a poultry and butter market; the upper floor was used as a courthouse. (Later, when the Assizes were sitting the lower floor would be boarded in to provide a second court room.)

After the rebuilding, from 1722, the Court of Quarter Session (which had previously only occasionally sat at Horsham) sat at the Town Hall every summer (with only five exceptions) up until 1939. In 1799 East Grinstead ceased to be an Assize town, and from that year the spring Assizes took place annually at Horsham Town Hall (and the summer sitting at Lewes). The Town Hall was also used in the 18th century as a theatre and a venue for public meetings.

By the beginning of the 19th century, though, the building had fallen into disrepair, and in 1809 the Court of Quarter Sessions threatened to move out to the new County Hall at Lewes; three years later the Court of Assize made the same threat. As a result, in 1812, the building was partially rebuilt with funding from Charles Howard, 11th Duke of Norfolk: a new north façade was added in the Norman style, and the ground floor was permanently enclosed to create a second court. The façade was decorated with three Coade stone heraldic panels: the royal arms in the centre, with the town arms and those of the Duke of Norfolk on either side. In 1820 a new turret clock by J Moore of Clerkenwell was provided by the 12th Duke, along with a bell for striking the hours. Despite the refurbishment, the Assizes moved permanently to Lewes in 1830.

By 1888 structural problems had re-emerged, leading to the Town Hall being more substantially rebuilt in 1888–89, again with support (this time from Henry Fitzalan-Howard, 15th Duke of Norfolk). The Norman façade was retained (with alterations to the gable) but the building behind it was rebuilt to a design by J. Percy Gates, architect, of New Shoreham. A new clock was installed, by W. H. Bailey & Co of Manchester, together with two additional bells for the quarters; together with the older bell these remain in place. Afterwards (from 1890) the spring Quarter Sessions took place here, in addition to the summer sitting.

Following the implementation of the Local Government Act 1888, which established county councils in every county, Horsham Town Hall and the Council House, Chichester, served alternately as the meeting place of the new West Sussex County Council. This arrangement continued until 1916, when the County Council acquired Wren's House in Chichester to serve as its headquarters.

Subsequently, the Town Hall continued to be used as a courthouse and, for a while, was used as a meeting place for Horsham Urban District Council (however Horsham Urban District Council bought Horsham Park House and grounds and began using the house as their council offices from 1928). Since 1890 the Quarter Sessions had sat both here and at Chichester, but after a new Chichester courthouse was opened in 1940 the use of Horsham Town Hall for the Quarter Sessions ceased.

The building continued in judicial use, however, as a County Court and Court of Petty Session. The initial stages of the trial of John Haigh, commonly known as the Acid Bath Murderer, who murdered six people and disposed of their bodies using sulphuric acid, took place here; he was committed for trial at Lewes Assizes in April 1949. In the basement are two sets of six prison cells, twelve in total, dating from the early 20th century.

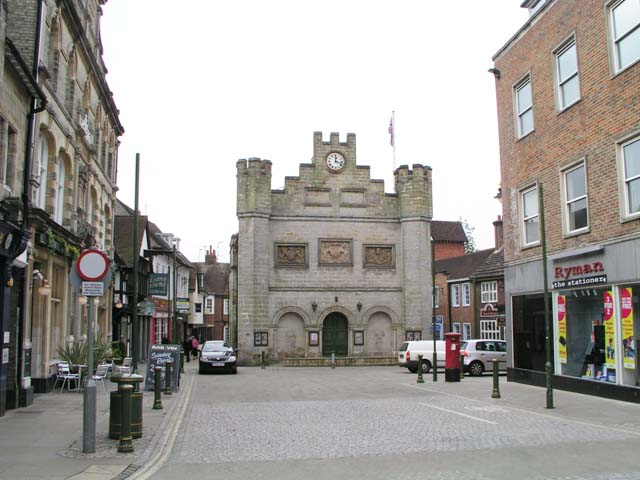
The Town Hall in 2007, when it was still in use as the local Register Office.

The Town Hall ceased to be used as a courthouse after the new law courts opened in Hurst Road in 1974. Subsequently, the building housed the Local Register Office: the upper floor was used as a ceremony room, with space for 26 guests, while the lower floor contained interview rooms and a waiting area. The Register Office relocated to Park House, Horsham in October 2009, after which the building remained empty for some years. In 2012, Horsham District Council (which retains ownership of the building) agreed to lease the premises to the restaurant chain Bill's; after a period of renovation it reopened as a restaurant in January the following year.
