= Peckham Williams =

High Sheriff of Sussex

Peckham Williams (1712-1785) was an English landowner who served as Sheriff of Sussex in 1750.

The only surviving son of John Williams (1662-1749) and his wife Jane Peckham, daughter and coheiress of Henry Peckham (1645-1694), he was baptised in Chichester on 4 March 1712. On the death of his father in 1749, he inherited his holdings and served as sheriff of the county in 1750. He is noted in Chichester for having bought Edes House, one of the most impressive buildings in the city. On 4 September 1758 at Farnham he married Elizabeth Souter, and they had three children: John, his heir; Elizabeth; and Jane. Quitting Chichester, the family moved to Badshot Lea. He was buried at Rumboldswyke on 6 December 1785.
