= Harriet Finlay-Johnson =

British educationalist and schoolteacher

- Harriet and her husband
- Born: 12 March 1871; Hampstead, England
- Died: 1956 (aged 84–85)
- Known for: Using drama in education
- Spouse: George Weller

Harriet Finlay-Johnson or Harriet Johnson or Harriet Weller (12 March 1871 – 1956) was a British educationalist and schoolteacher known for encouraging children to create dramas to improve their education.

== Life ==
Finlay-Johnson was born in Hampstead in 1871. Her parents were Thomas Connolly and Jane (born FitzPatrick) Johnson. Harriet and her sister Emily both became teachers. She qualified in 1892 after working for eight years at St Mary's School, Willesden.

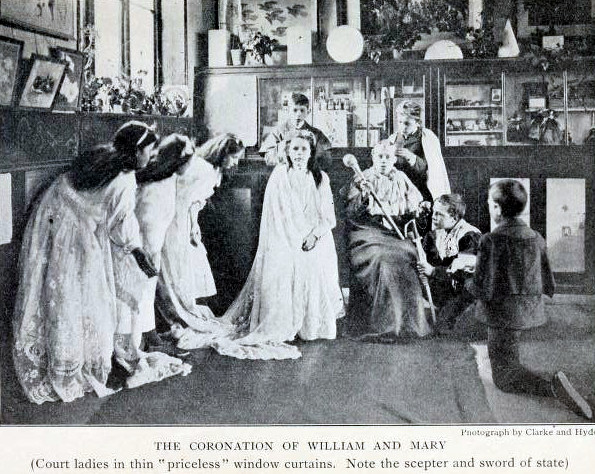
The "Coronation of William and Mary" by the children using net curtains for costumes

She became the headmistress of the village school in Sompting in Sussex in 1897. Her sister Emily was employed on the same day on the same salary. Emily was in charge of the infants whilst Harriet was head. She led fifty children and she decided that only a revolutionary approach would put the children as the focus of education - "to help them to grow". She started by using nature walks. The approach at the school was not based on control but in empowering the children with educational visits. By 1903 she was one of twelve teachers chosen to serve on an advisory board on elementary education in her county.

Finlay-Johnson's major work was described in her book The dramatic Method of Teaching (1911). It explains how she had encouraged children to create their own plays. Sometimes these would be based on works of fiction but at other times they would create their own original plays based on their own research of facts from history. The teacher was seen as the facilitator and not the lead in the investigation that created the drama. Moreover, she believed that the final creation should not be judged by adult concepts of how good the production was but through the eyes of the participants.

== Marriage ==
Johnson's achievements became well known and although she was only the headmistress of a small Sussex school her work had wide interest. Her career however came to a premature end when she decided to marry George Weller in 1909. George was a former pupil but he was twenty years of age and seventeen years younger than his former headteacher. Johnson had to leave the profession and one source says this was due to the scandal of marrying a former younger pupil. However Harriet did nor resign until 21 January 1910 and another woman had previously resigned from the school due to becoming married. George was in business and he lived until 1952 whilst Harriet died in 1956. They are buried in St Mary's churchyard in Sompting.

== Legacy ==
Her work was built on by Henry Caldwell Cook at The Perse School and popularised in his book "The Play Way". Johnson's life has been the subject of a biography by Mary Bowmaker. The school building in Sompting is now a community centre which is named the Harriet Johnson Centre. On the side of the building is a blue plaque to Harriet Finlay Johnson.
