= Kingston by Ferring =

Civil parish in West Sussex, England

Coordinates: 50.8043°N 0.46166°W

Kingston
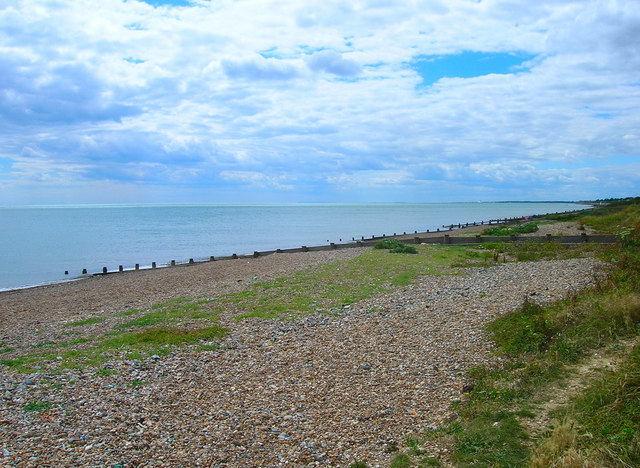
- West Kingston Beach

- Location within West Sussex
- Area: 1.72 km^{2} (0.66 sq mi)
- Population: 625 (Civil Parish.2011)
  - Density: 363/km^{2} (940/sq mi)
- OS grid reference: TQ085016
  - London: 50 miles (80 km) NNE
- Civil parish: Kingston
- District: Arun
- Shire county: West Sussex
- Region: South East
- Country: England
- Sovereign state: United Kingdom
- Post town: LITTLEHAMPTON
- Postcode district: BN16
- Dialling code: 01903
- Police: Sussex
- Fire: West Sussex
- Ambulance: South East Coast
- UK Parliament: Worthing West

Kingston or Kingston by Ferring, is a small civil parish in the Arun District of West Sussex, England. It is a combination of a farmed rural interior and the three neighbourhoods of East Kingston, West Kingston and Kingston Gorse. The parish lies on the coast, between Ferring and East Preston parishes.

== Geography and economy ==
Kingston is three miles (5 km) to the west of Worthing and among the most sparsely populated areas in the Brighton/Worthing/Littlehampton conurbation; there is road access from East Preston and Angmering-on-Sea but not from Ferring to the east. A generally pedestrianised seafront connects the parish to Littlehampton and to Worthing.

The original village centre including the parish church was lost to the sea around 1630 and remains have been found well below the present highwater line.

== Localities ==
Kingston Gorse is a seaside neighbourhood south of East Kingston farm, centred 3.4 miles (5.6 km) east of Littlehampton.

== Crime ==
Kingston has been devoid of major crime reported widely since at least the early 19th century, save that a cornfield in the parish is where murder victim Sarah Payne was playing with her siblings when abducted on 1 July 2000. Her body was found 15 miles (24 km) away at Pulborough two weeks later. Littlehampton resident Roy Whiting, a convicted child sex offender, was later sentenced to life imprisonment for her murder.
