= Sompting =

Village and parish in West Sussex, England

Coordinates: 50.8303°N 0.3395°W

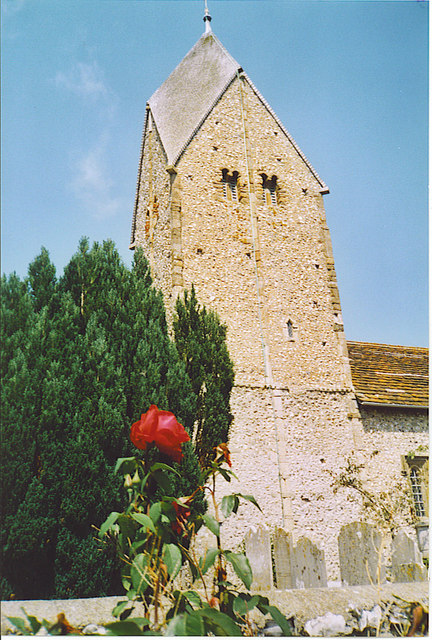
- Tower of St Mary's Church, 2004

- Location within West Sussex
- Area: 4.00 sq mi (10.4 km^{2})
- Population: 8,561 (Civil Parish 2011)
  - Density: 2,140/sq mi (830/km^{2})
- OS grid reference: TQ170047
  - London: 47 miles (76 km) N
- District: Adur
- Shire county: West Sussex
- Region: South East
- Country: England
- Sovereign state: United Kingdom
- Post town: LANCING
- Postcode district: BN15
- Dialling code: 01903
- Police: Sussex
- Fire: West Sussex
- Ambulance: South East Coast
- UK Parliament: East Worthing and Shoreham
- Website: http://www.sompting.org.uk/

Sompting is a village and civil parish in the coastal Adur District of West Sussex, England between Lancing and Worthing. It is half grassland slopes and half developed plain at the foot of the South Downs National Park. Twentieth-century estates dovetail into those of slightly larger Lancing.

== Etymology ==
The village's name comes from the Old English *sumpt + -ingas, meaning "(settlement of) the dwellers at the marsh". Its earliest recorded form is Suntinga, in a document of 956, but Domesday Book (1086) renders the name as Sultinges, its Norman-speaking clerks being unfamiliar with the consonant-cluster -mpt. As the toponymist Adrian Room noted, there is no obviously marshy land there nowadays, but it is low-lying and near the sea.

== Landmarks and major buildings ==
The Church of St Mary the Blessed Virgin is a Grade I-listed Anglo-Saxon and Norman church, separated from the centre of the village since 1939 by the busy A27 road. Its tower is topped with a "Rhenish helm"—a four-sided gabled pyramidal cap which is rare in England. The church was originally built by the Saxons c.960 AD, then was adapted by the Normans when William de Braose, 1st Lord of Bramber granted it to the Knights Templar in the 12th century. The church later passed to the Knights Hospitaller in the 15th century.

The Sompting Abbotts building, designed by Philip Charles Hardwick and completed in 1856, was a preparatory school from 1921 until its closure in 2026. However this has been the site of one of Sompting's manor houses since Norman times, when it was owned by the abbot of Fécamp in Normandy, and later owned by the abbot of Syon Abbey in Middlesex. In 1248 the abbot of Fécamp had a prison in the village. Queen Caroline, consort of King George IV stayed at Sompting Abbotts in 1814 on her way across the English Channel to the Continent.

The old Sompting Rectory building, now used as a nursing home, dates from 1791. However, the Rectory has a long history, having previously been owned by the Knights Templar from 1154 and, like Sompting Church, passed to the Knights Hospitaller in the 15th century. During the First World War a prisoner-of-war camp was built on the Rectory Farm estate, on the west side of Busticle Lane.

Sompting's Parish Hall was originally built as a reading room in 1889 by HP Crofts of Sompting Abbotts manor: his Crofts/Tristram family have owned farmland and built property in the parish, known as the Sompting Estate, since 1748. As well as the church mentioned alternative Christian worship at the Methodist mission chapel, registered in 1887 formerly took place. Sompting Community Centre was originally built in 1872 as a junior and infants school. It was known as a place of innovative education due to the work of the headmistress Harriet Finlay-Johnson who used drama as the focus of the village children's education.

A house which belonged to Edward Trelawny, adventurer, author and friend of Percy Bysshe Shelley, is also in the village.

The parish of Sompting includes the hamlet of Beggars Bush on the Downs as well as the former hamlets of Upper Cokeham and Lower Cokeham, which are now part of the Sompting-Lancing conurbation. Cokeham means Cocca's homestead (ham). Sompting also historically extended west to the ancient droveway today known as Charmandean Lane, but in 1933 this land was given to the neighbouring borough of Worthing. Sompting's eastern border with Lancing has historically been defined by the Boundstone Lane, so called because of the boundary stone or boundstone that lay on the boundary. The stone is now kept in Boundstone Nursery.

On the northern edge a settlement existed at Park Brow on the Downs' crest in the Bronze Age through the Iron Age until Roman times. It lasted until its buildings were burned down c.270 AD, possibly by Saxon or Frankish pirates. It is supposed that the inhabitants moved from here to the relative safety of the hillfort at Cissbury Ring.

== Geography ==
The highest point in the civil parish is Steep Down at 149 metres (489 ft) above Ordnance Datum (sea level).

In the western part of the parish of Sompting lies the Sompting Gap, a protected area that lies between Sompting and Worthing. This area was formerly an inlet of the sea and it is here that the Broadwater Brook (also known as Sompting Brook) flows into Brooklands Park and on into the sea. Some of the reedbeds in the Sompting Gap at Lower Cokeham have been designated a Site of Nature Conservation Importance.

Sompting is about 2 miles (3 km) north-east of the centre of Worthing. The nearest railway station is Lancing.

== In literature ==
The writer Alfred Longley lived in Sompting, creator of the character 'Jimmy Smuggles' and his Sompting Treacle Mines, where "incredibly lazy people worked".

== Annual events ==
Sompting is also known for its mummers play, performed by the Sompting Village Morris dancers.

In 2005, a small group of people got together and started the Sompting Festival, which was held for the first time over the weekend of 2–4 June 2006, as one of the launch events for the Adur festival. Since then, this has developed into the annual Sompting Beer & Music Festival held on Sompting Recreation Ground, West Street, Sompting. It incorporates the Sompting Village Hall Open Weekend, and the Somptin' Old exhibition – a history of Sompting in pictures set up by former Sompting Parish Councillor Mike Prince, which attracts interest from all over the world.
