= Church of St Mary the Blessed Virgin, Sompting =

Church in West Sussex, England

Church of St Mary the Blessed Virgin
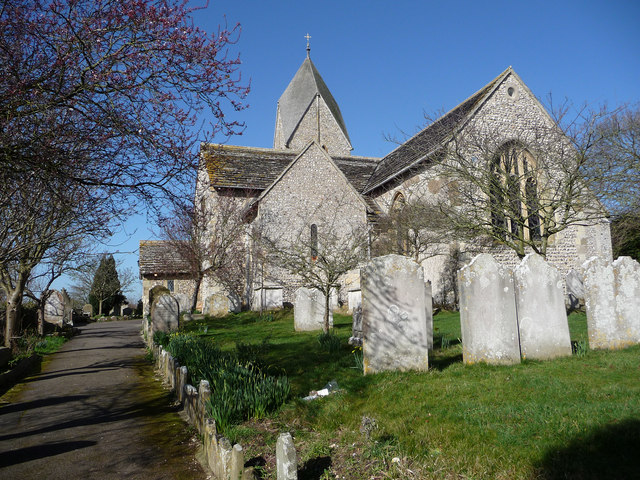
- The church from the southeast
- Church of St Mary the Blessed Virgin
- 50.8386°N 0.3518°W
- Location: Church Lane, Sompting, West Sussex BN15 0AZ
- Country: England
- Denomination: Church of England
- Churchmanship: Anglo-Catholic
- Website: https://www.chalkspringchurches.org/st-mary-the-virgin

History
- Status: Parish church
- Founded: 11th century
- Dedication: Virgin Mary
- Dedicated: By 1442

Architecture
- Functional status: Active
- Heritage designation: Grade I
- Designated: 12 October 1954
- Style: Anglo-Saxon; Norman
- Completed: 11th century

Administration
- Diocese: Diocese of Chichester
- Archdeaconry: Chichester
- Deanery: Rural Deanery of Worthing
- Parish: South Lancing and Sompting

Clergy
- Vicar: Vacancy

The Church of St Mary the Blessed Virgin, also known as St Mary the Virgin Church and St Mary's Church, is the Church of England parish church of Sompting in the Adur district of West Sussex. It stands on a rural lane north of the urban area that now surrounds the village, and retains much 11th- and 12th-century structure. Its most important architectural feature is the Saxon tower topped by a Rhenish helm, a four-sided pyramid-style gabled cap that is uncommon in England. English Heritage lists the church at Grade I for its architecture and history.

== History ==
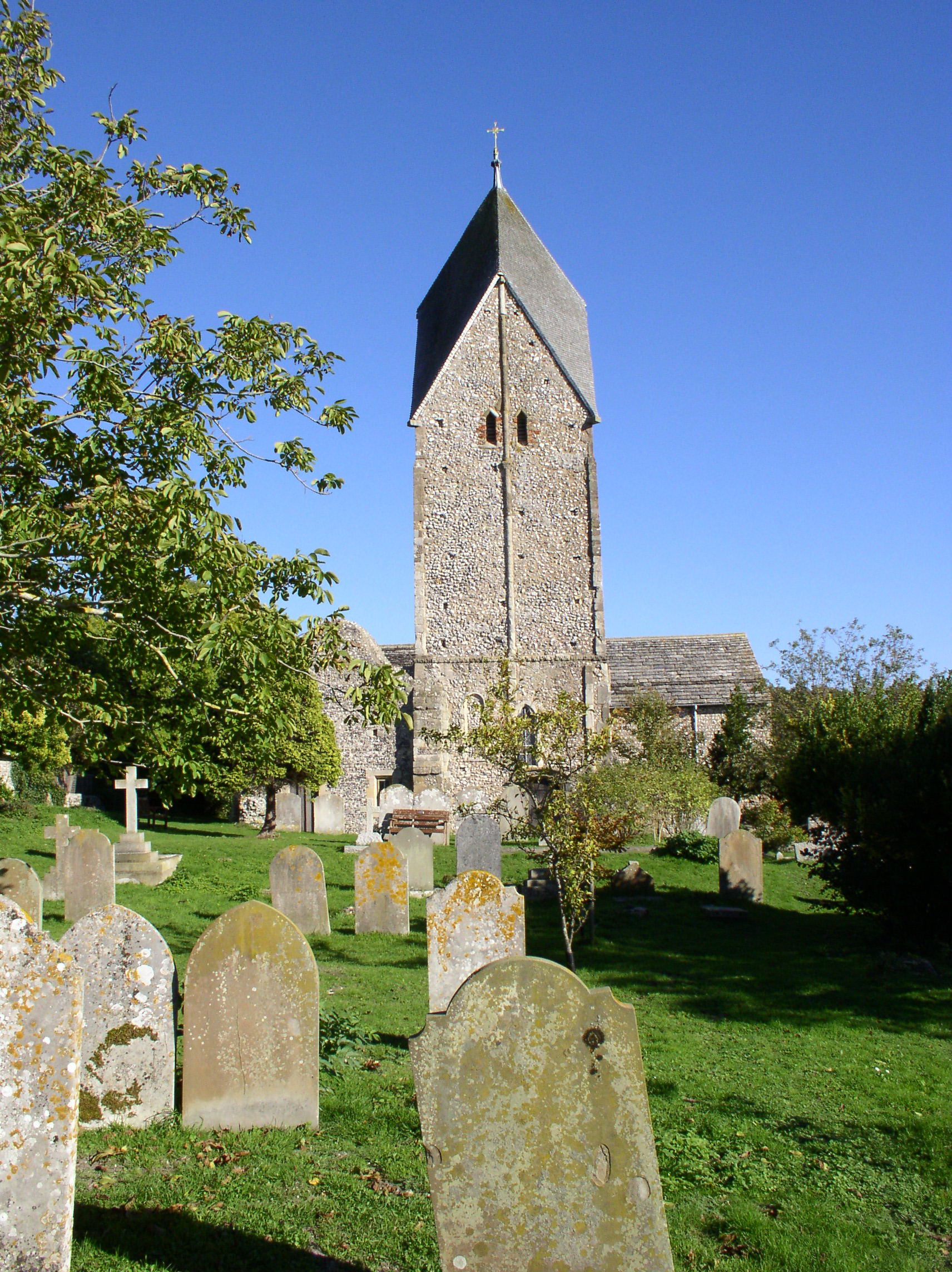
The Rhenish helm on the church tower

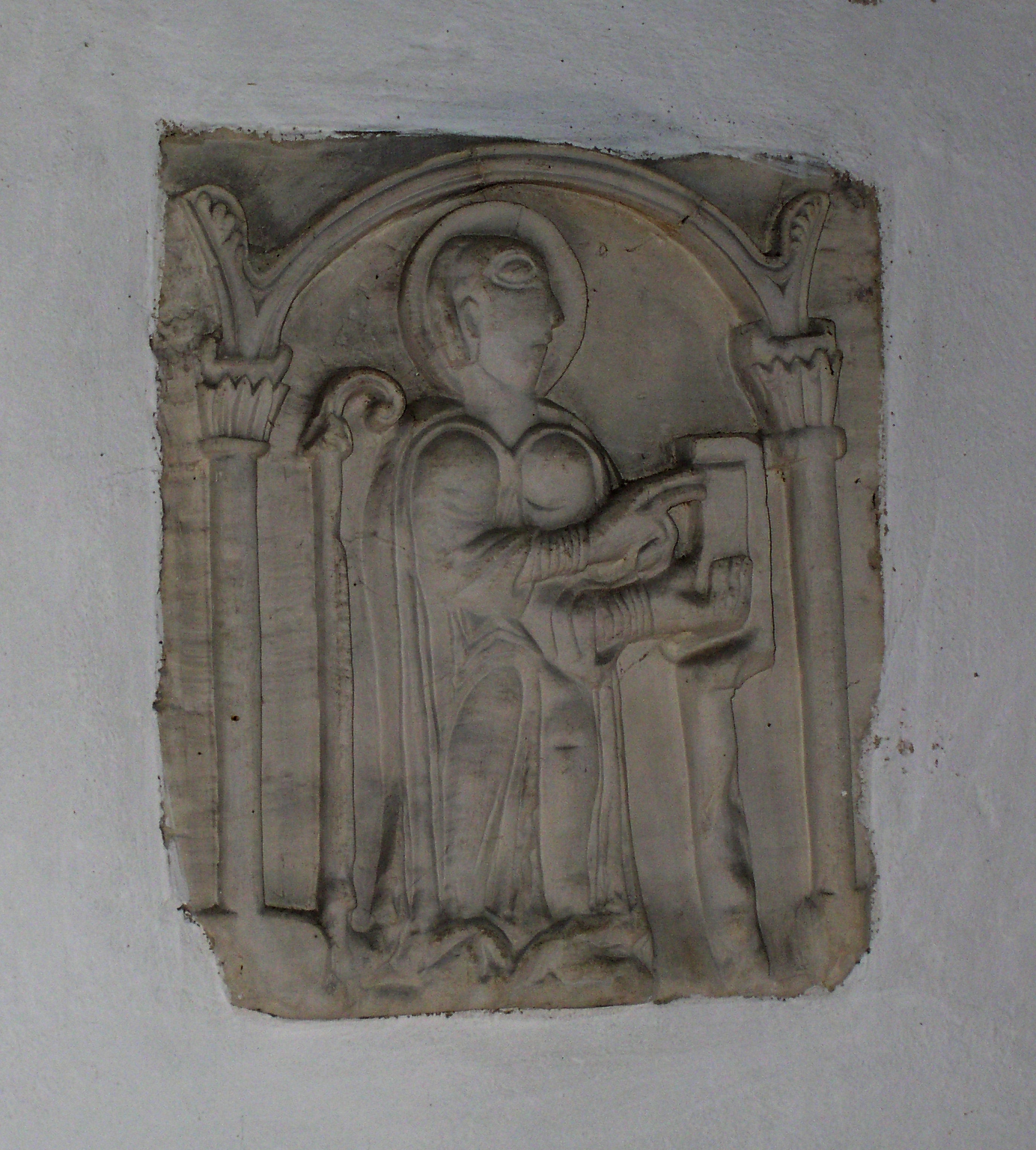
Ancient carving of an abbot in the south transept

Settlement of the area now covered by Sompting began in the Bronze Age and continued through the Iron Age and into the Roman era. By the 11th century, two distinct villages had formed: Sompting, based on the main east–west trackway from the cathedral city of Chichester to Brighton, and Cokeham to the south (later subdivided into Upper Cokeham and Lower Cokeham). At the time of the Domesday Book in 1086 they were separate manors, but were both held on behalf of William de Braose, 1st Lord of Bramber.

There was a church on the site of the present building by the early 11th century, and some structural elements remain from that era. William de Braose held the advowson at the time of the Domesday survey, but in 1154 his grandson William de Braose, 3rd Lord of Bramber passed it to the Knights Templar, who made many structural changes. They widened the church by rebuilding the nave and chancel to the same width as the Saxon-era tower. In about 1180, they erected a large chapel—effectively a separate church in its own right until the 19th century, when an arch linked it to the nave and made it a de facto south transept. At the same time, they added a north transept with an aisle and two chapels. They also paid for a vicar and his accommodation.

After the Knights Templar were emasculated in 1307, Pope Clement V conveyed ownership of the church to the Knights Hospitaller, another religious order, in 1324. They extended the nave on the northwest side—forming a chapel which had openings into the nave and the tower— built a porch on the south side and carried out work on the nave walls. Although the advowson later passed out of the Knights' control, it was restored to the order in 1963 by Major G. H. Tristram. They had been dissolved in 1538 but were re-established in 1831 as the Venerable Order of Saint John and later founded the St. John Ambulance organisation.

The church fell into decay during the 18th century, when the living was poor and the villages of Sompting and Cokeham still supported only a small population. Repairs in the 1720s and 1760s were not enough, and two bells had to be sold to pay for proper repairs in 1791. Richard Cromwell Carpenter undertook more restoration in 1853: this included re-roofing the church and replacing the shinglework on the spire, rebuilding the Knights Templars' chapel into a south transept, improving the aisle in the north transept and cleaning the stonework.

The tower is the most important feature of the church and is known nationally and internationally as an exemplar of Saxon architecture—although recent analysis suggests that its upper stage may have been renewed in early Norman times to an identical design. The spire—a design known as the Rhenish helm because of its prevalence in the Rhineland area of Germany—is unique in England. The design comprises a cap of four shingled gables rising steeply in a pyramid formation.

== Architecture ==
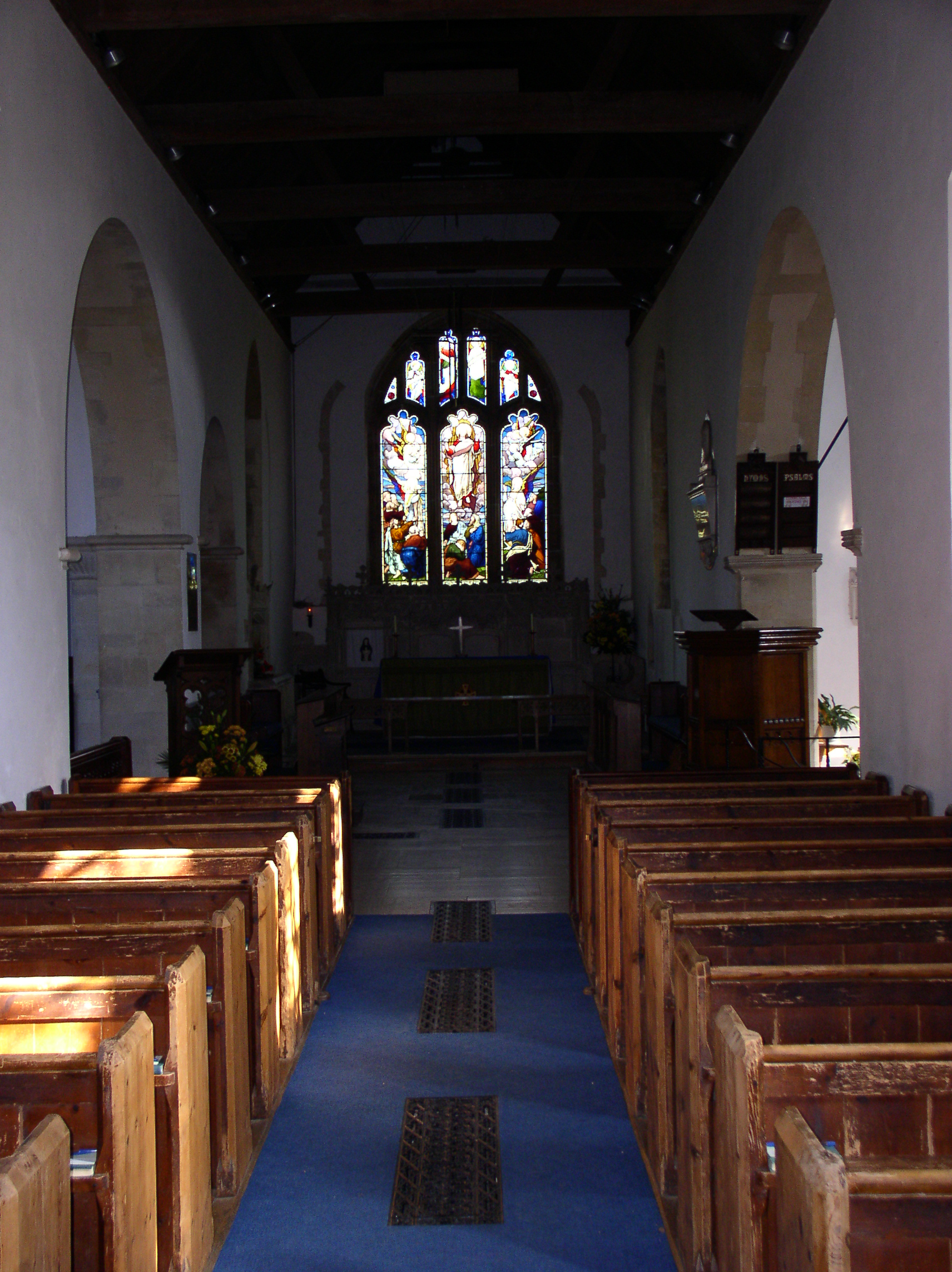
The nave looking towards the east

The church is a flint building with dressings of Caen stone and a slate roof. The tower, at the west end, incorporates some reused Roman-era brickwork, and was built in two parts; it assumed its current appearance by the end of the 11th century. The "elegant" structure has stone pilasters at each corner, but lacks buttresses. The tower arch dates from the Saxon period and is offset; an altar would originally have stood next to it. The base of the tower may have served as the original entrance porch.

The nave and chancel form a single entity: they are not demarcated by a chancel arch. They were widened in the 12th century (without the addition of aisles) to the same width as the tower. Masonry from the walls of the original nave is believed to have been incorporated in the rebuilt walls. The north transept has an aisle of two bays, intricate rib vaulting and small bosses. The aisle has circular piers with square abaci and delicate capitals. The south transept—formerly the separate chapel of the Knights Templar—is linked to the rest of the church by a 19th-century arch and doorway. The chapel, built at a lower level than the church, is rib-vaulted and has a series of foliated capitals in a style similar to the Corinthian.

Remnants of Saxon- and Norman-era sculpture can still be seen in the church. In the south transept, near the 12th-century font, is a carved abbot in good condition. A 13th-century Christ in Majesty incorporates older decorative stonework. Some frieze-work is visible on the chancel wall.

== The church today ==
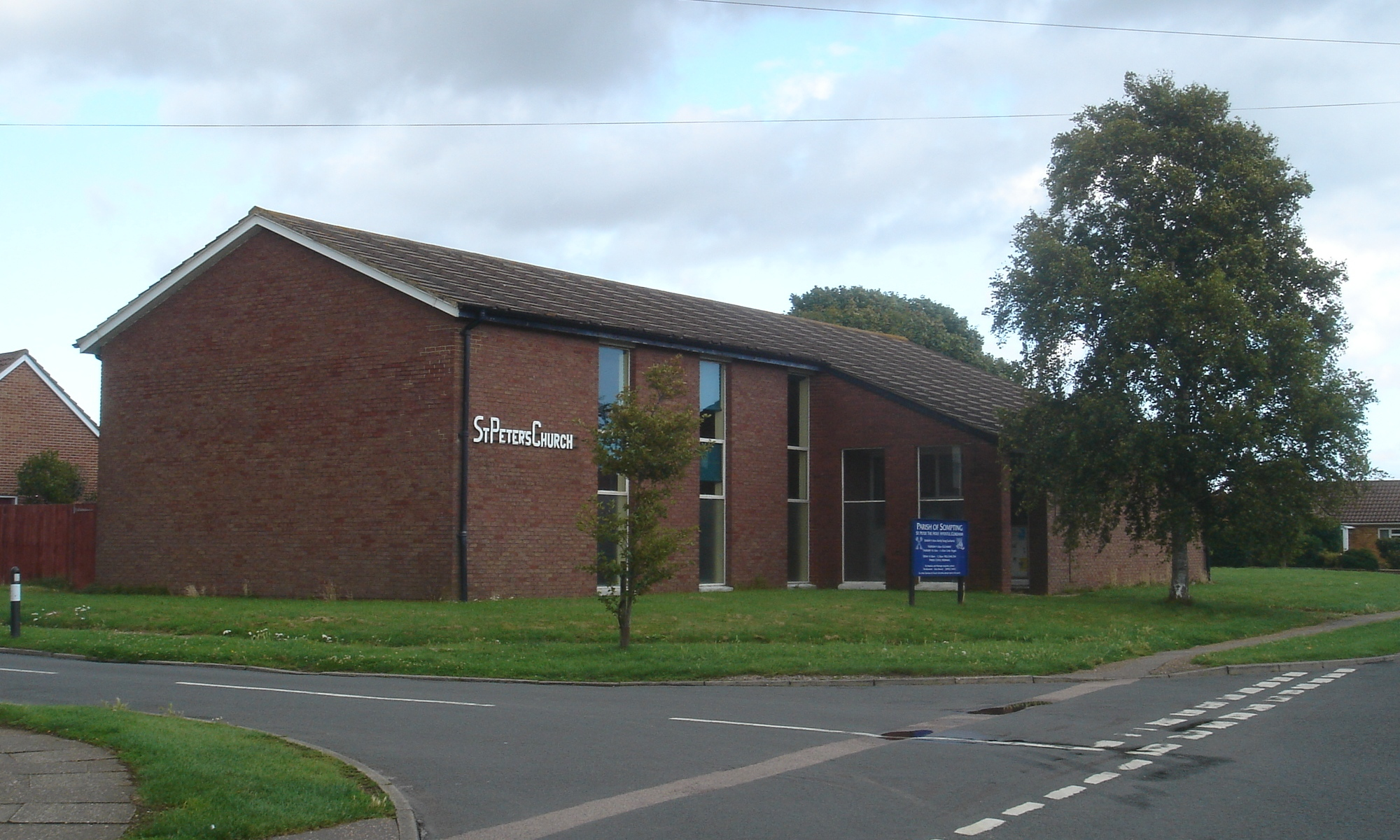
St Peter the Apostle's Church in Lower Cokeham is part of St Mary's parish

The Church of St Mary the Blessed Virgin was listed at Grade I by English Heritage on 12 October 1954. Such buildings are defined as being of "exceptional interest" and greater than national importance. As of February 2001, it was one of seven Grade I listed buildings, and 119 listed buildings of all grades, in Adur district. The Sompting headmistress, Harriet Finlay-Johnson, who became known for her innovative education was buried in the churchyard in 1956.

The parish covers Sompting village and the surrounding urban area, as far as the boundaries with Lancing and Worthing; it also extends a long way to the north on to the southern slopes of the South Downs. The eastern boundary is formed by Boundstone Lane and Upper Boundstone Lane in Lancing, while the western boundary is Charmandean Lane on the edge of the Worthing built-up area. The parish covers 2,507 acres (1,015 ha). St Peter the Apostle's Church, a modern brick building in the Lower Cokeham area of Sompting, is within the parish. It was consecrated in 1966 and serves as a multi-purpose church hall as well as a place of worship.

There is a said Mass with Hymns at St. Mary's at 9 am on the third Sunday of each month, as well as a 5 pm Choral Evensong on any fifth Sundays of the month. St. Mary's is open for visitors on Tuesday mornings each week. The Church also celebrates their Patronal festival in August of each year. On the first, second and fourth Sundays of the month there is a 9 am said Mass with Hymns at the church of St. Peter's, Bowness Avenue, Sompting.

== See also ==
- List of places of worship in Adur
- List of works by R. C. Carpenter
