= East Preston, West Sussex =

Village and parish in West Sussex, England

Coordinates: 50.81041°N 0.48189°W

East Preston
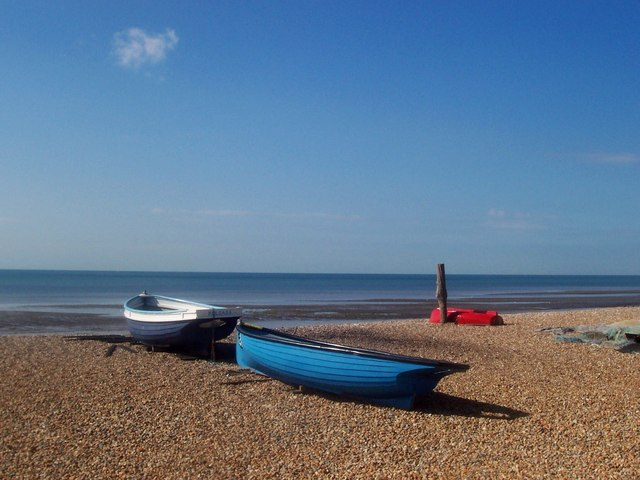
- View of East Preston beach

- Location within West Sussex
- Area: 2.00 km^{2} (0.77 sq mi)
- Population: 5,938 (Civil Parish 2011)
  - Density: 2,969/km^{2} (7,690/sq mi)
- OS grid reference: TQ070023
  - London: 50 miles (80 km) NNE
- Civil parish: East Preston
- District: Arun
- Shire county: West Sussex
- Region: South East
- Country: England
- Sovereign state: United Kingdom
- Post town: LITTLEHAMPTON
- Postcode district: BN16
- Dialling code: 01903
- Police: Sussex
- Fire: West Sussex
- Ambulance: South East Coast
- UK Parliament: Worthing West

East Preston is a coastal village and civil parish in the Arun District of West Sussex, England. It lies roughly halfway between Littlehampton and Worthing.

East Preston comprises the following residential areas, from east to west: Kingston Gorse, West Kingston, Angmering-on-Sea, East Preston Village and The Willowhayne.

== Village school ==
The original village school building nowadays houses an estate agent firm. It was built in 1840 and started as a Sunday School funded by George Olliver. He received a reward for reporting a farm labourer (Edmund Bushby) for igniting a hayrick for moving the hay about efficiently. The labourer burned the hayrick in protest against farm machinery replacing manual labour. Bushby was subsequently hanged. Over time the building was enlarged into the village school until it was given to Sussex County Council in 1940. There were four classrooms, one very large room, having a curtain divided it into two. There were two separate playgrounds. This building remained as the village school until 1951 when the new school in Lashmar Road was opened.

== Amenities ==
East Preston and Kingston Village Hall on Sea Road were converted from old barns left to the community by the Warren family of Preston Hall.

== East Preston Festival ==
East Preston Festival started in 1981 and runs each year for ten days at the end of May / beginning of June, with all event proceeds divided between donations to local community groups and good causes, and the funding of subsequent Festivals.

The Festival was unable to run in 2020 due to the Covid-19 pandemic, but a 3-day 'Mini Festival Weekend' went ahead in 2021.

== Sport and leisure ==
East Preston has a Non-League football club East Preston F.C. which plays at The Lashmar, Lashmar Road.

== Notable people ==
A county dignitary resident in the parish was Charles Boughton-Leigh.

Other notable residents include:

- Mitchell Symons, journalist and bestselling author.
- Des Lynam, British television and radio presenter.
- Vivian Van Damm, manager and owner of the Windmill Theatre.
- Richard Henry Walthew (1872–1951) composer, lived at 1 Clarence Drive towards the end of his life.
- Israel Zangwill (1864–1926), writer and advocate of Jewish causes.
- Edith Ayrton Zangwill (died 1945), author.
- Sir Maurice Craig (1866–1935), a British psychiatrist and pioneer in the treatment of mental illness. He was governor of the Royal Hospitals of Bethlem and Bridewell, president of the section of psychiatry at the Royal Society of Medicine and vice-president of the International Committee for Mental Hygiene. Craig was one of the psychiatrists that Virginia Woolf consulted when she suffered her breakdowns.
- Heywood Hardy (1842–1933), British artist, who lived in the area from 1909 for most of the rest of his life.
- Brigadier Noel Hugh-Jones (1894–1952), decorated career British army officer who in 1942 was front line commander at Sittang Bridge, Burma (Myanmar). He received instructions to destroy the bridge to stop the Japanese advance on Rangoon (Yangton). Due to communication problems he was unaware that many of his Gurkha troops, who were fighting a rear-guard action, were still on the wrong side of the bridge. After the explosion, he discovered the enormity of the loss of both men and materiel. He collapsed and it was said his hair turned white within days from the shock. He was shipped home on medical grounds. He drowned in 1952 whilst swimming in the sea near East Preston.
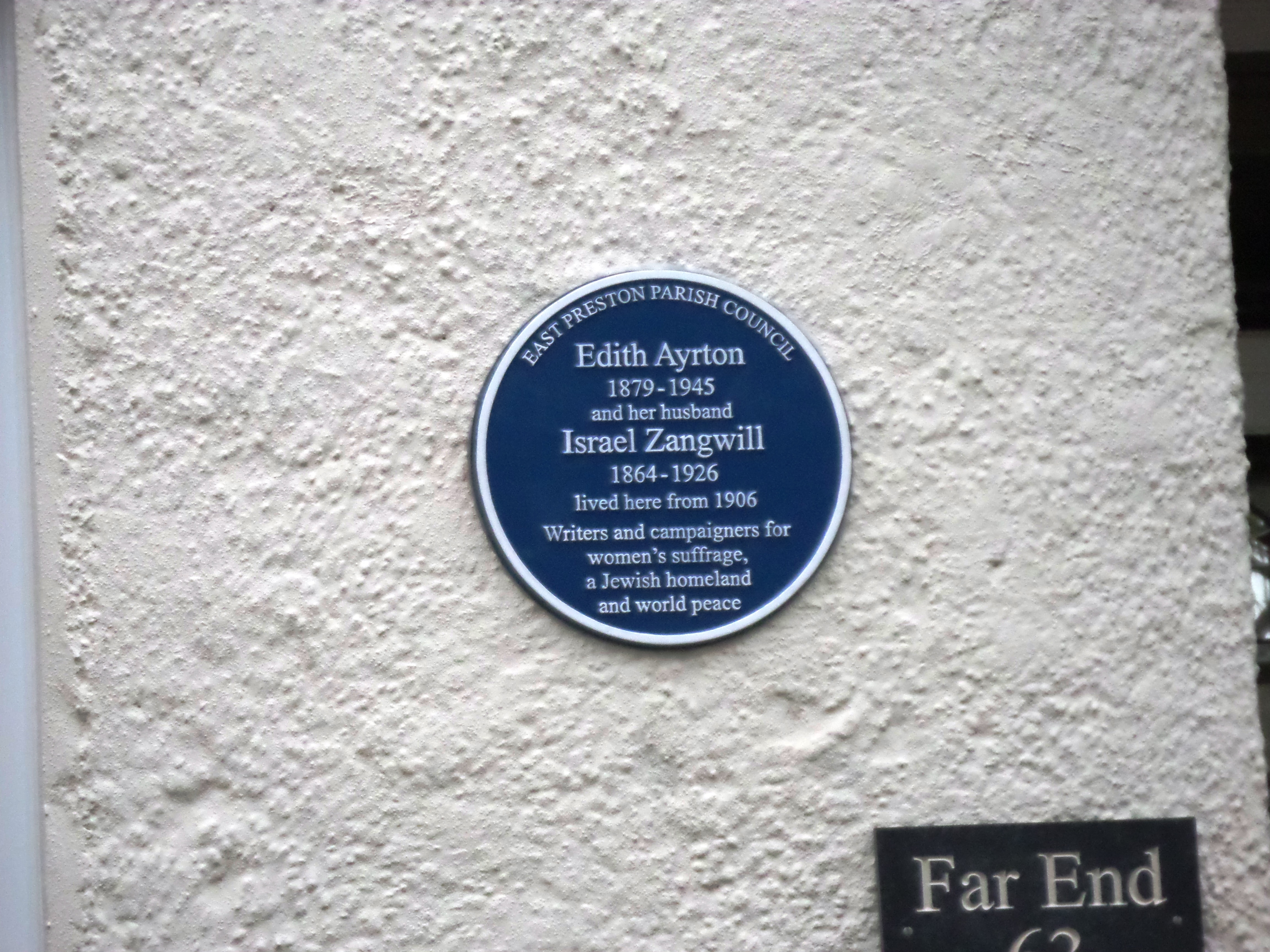
Edith & Israel Zangwill Blue Plaque, Far End, East Preston

== See also ==
- Worthing Rural District
