= Edes House =

County building in Chichester, West Sussex, England

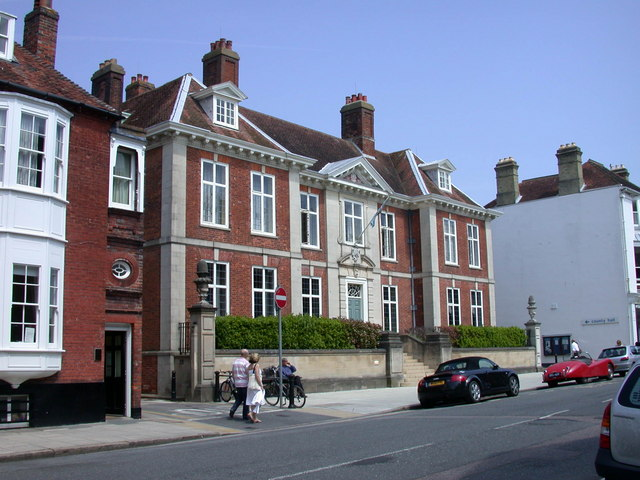

- Location within West Sussex
- 50.8371°N 0.7829°W
- Location: Chichester, West Sussex

History
- Built: 1696

Listed Building – Grade I
- Designated: 5 July 1950
- Reference no.: 1026616

Edes House is mansion in Chichester, West Sussex. The building, which was the headquarters of West Sussex County Council from 1916 to 1936, is a Grade I listed building.

== History ==
The building was built for John Edes, a maltster, and his wife, Hannah, and completed in 1696. It was originally thought to have been designed by Sir Christopher Wren but this theory has more recently been discounted as unlikely. The design involved a symmetrical main frontage with nine bays facing West Street with the last two bays at each end slightly projected forwards; the central bay, which was faced with Portland stone, featured a doorway on the ground floor with broken curved pediment above; there was a casement window on the first floor flanked by narrow Ionic order pilasters and a pediment above.

The house passed down the Edes family line to their son, Henry, and granddaughter, Mary. It was then acquired by Peckham Williams, Sheriff of Sussex in the mid-18th century. It then passed down the Williams family line, being inherited by a senior physician at Chichester Infirmary, Dr Joseph McCarogher, in 1848. It was then acquired by a local man, William Duke, in 1860. During the 19th century it was known as Westgate House, but it was referred to as West Street House from 1905 and as Wren's House from 1911. After being owned by the artist, Walter Ernest Tower, in the early 20th century, it was acquired by West Sussex County Council for use as a meeting place and administrative centre in 1916.

The County Council built itself a new County Hall in the grounds of Wren House between 1933 and 1936, after which the house became the headquarters of the County Library and also the County Record Office. In 1967 the name of the house was simplified to Wren House and after the County Record Office moved to new facilities in Orchard Street in 1989, it became a venue for weddings and other ceremonies. The name was changed again in 1993, this time to Edes House, after a historical analysis by the county archivist, Francis Steer, discounted the theory that Wren had designed the building, on the basis that he was wholly employed designing St Paul's Cathedral at the time.

In October 2018, the Duke and Duchess of Sussex visited the building where they viewed an original copy of the United States Declaration of Independence, which had been uncovered in the County Archives.

Works of art in the building include a series of watercolour paintings by the local artist, George Herbert Catt (1869–1920), who lived at the Depot House in Chichester.
