= West Sussex County Council elections =

Local government elections in West Sussex, England

West Sussex County Council in England is elected every four years.

== Council elections ==
- 1997 West Sussex County Council election
- 2001 West Sussex County Council election
- 2005 West Sussex County Council election (boundary changes reduced the number of seats by 1)
- 2009 West Sussex County Council election (boundary changes)
- 2013 West Sussex County Council election
- 2017 West Sussex County Council election
- 2021 West Sussex County Council election
- 2026 West Sussex County Council election

== Election results ==
Composition of the council
Year	Conservative	Liberal Democrats (Note: Includes totals for the predecessors of the Liberal Democrats, the Liberal Party and SDP (both of which participated in the Alliance).)	Labour	Green	UKIP	Reform	Independents and others	Council control after election
Local government reorganisation; council established (83 seats)
1973	58	7	10	–	–	–	8	Conservative
New division boundaries (80 seats)
1977	74	2	4	0	–	–	0	Conservative
1981	57	14	8	0	–	–	1	Conservative
New division boundaries (71 seats)
1985	46	17	8	0	–	–	0	Conservative
1989	46	15	9	0	–	–	1	Conservative
1993	26	34	10	0	–	–	1	No overall control
1997	37	24	9	0	0	–	1	Conservative
2001	42	18	11	0	0	–	0	Conservative
New division boundaries (71 seats)
2005	46	17	7	0	0	–	1 (Note: One vacant seat)	Conservative
New division boundaries (71 seats)
2009	48	21	2	0	0	–	0	Conservative
2013	46	8	6	0	10	–	1	Conservative
New division boundaries (70 seats)
2017	56	9	5	0	0	–	0	Conservative
2021	48	10	9	1	0	0	2 (Note: Including 1 Local Alliance)	Conservative
2026	11	23	5	7	–	23	1 (Note: One Local Alliance seat)	No overall control

== Results maps ==
2005 results map

2009 results map

2013 results map

2017 results map

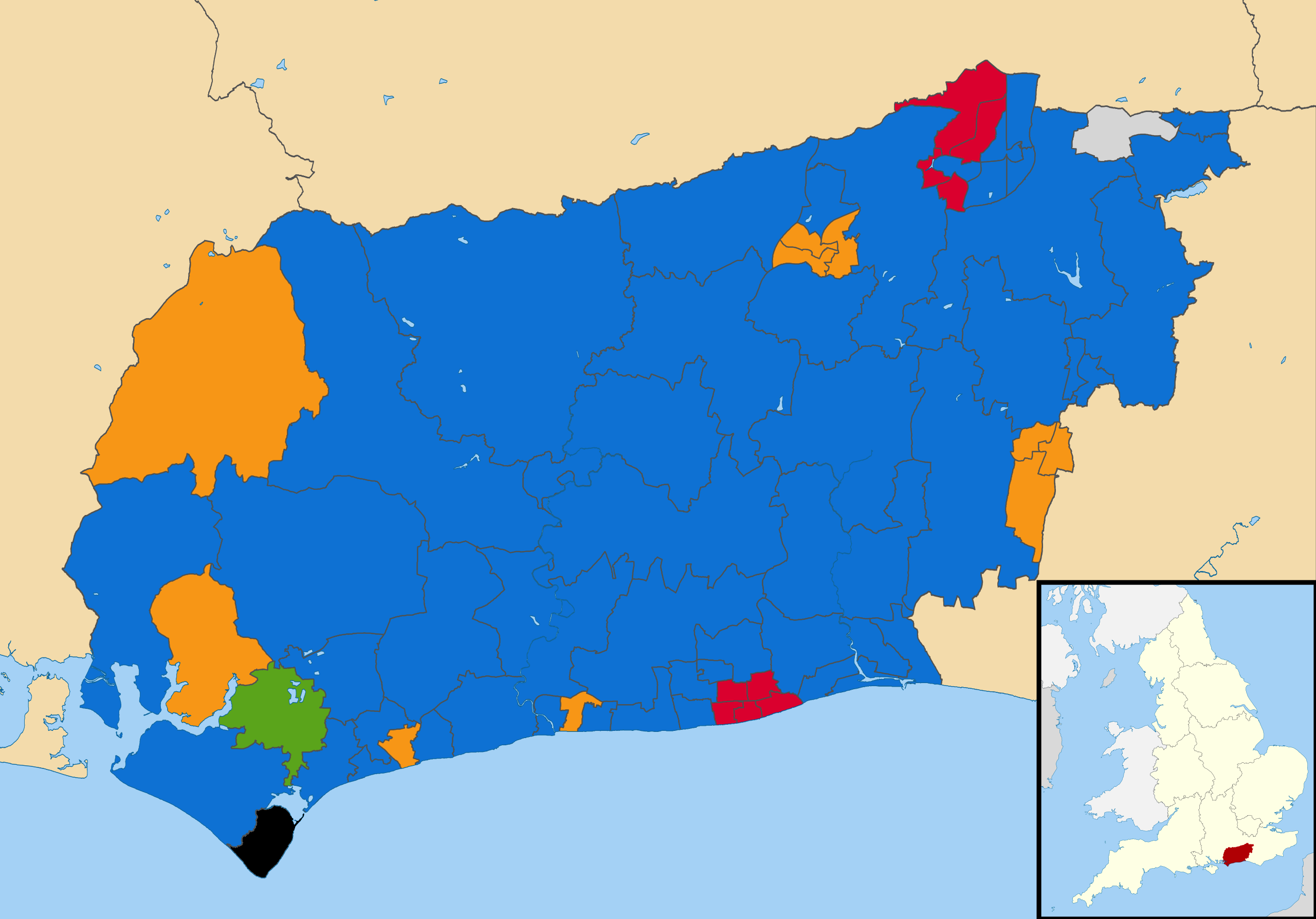
2021 results map

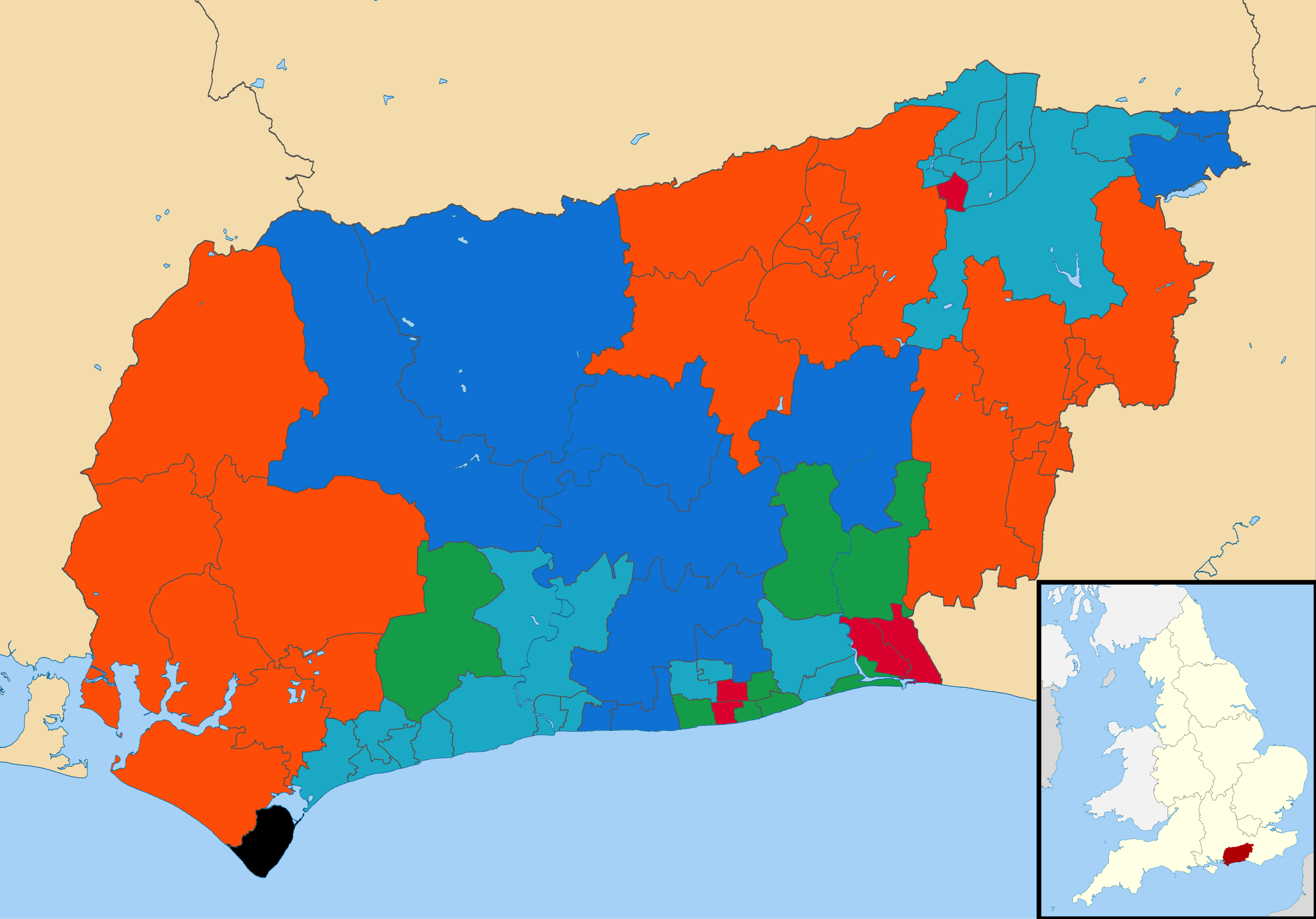
2026 results map

== By-election results ==
=== 1993-1997 ===
Ifield by-election 11 July 1996
Party	Candidate	Votes	%	±%
Labour		1,283	79.8	
Conservative		229	14.2	
Liberal Democrats		96	6.0	
Majority		1,054	65.6	
Turnout		1,608	26.7	
Labour hold		Swing		

=== 1997-2001 ===
Chichester East by-election 7 May 1998
Party	Candidate	Votes	%	±%
Liberal Democrats		1,077	50.2	+4.5
Conservative		750	34.9	−0.5
Labour		319	14.9	−3.9
Majority		327	15.3	
Turnout		2,146		
Liberal Democrats hold		Swing		

Steyning by-election 6 May 1999
Party	Candidate	Votes	%	±%
Conservative	Michael Willett	1,297	44.0	+1.6
Liberal Democrats	Derek Deedman	1,040	35.3	−12.0
Labour	John Ridley	480	16.3	+6.1
Independent	Bernard Durnford	132	4.5	+4.5
Majority		257	8.7	
Turnout		2,949		
Conservative gain from Liberal Democrats		Swing		

Gossops Green by-election 28 September 2000
Party	Candidate	Votes	%	±%
Labour		830	50.7	−1.1
Conservative		635	38.8	+4.3
Liberal Democrats		171	10.4	+0.0
Majority		195	11.9	
Turnout		1,636	23.1	
Labour hold		Swing		

=== 2001-2005 ===
Cuckfield Rural by-election 3 July 2003
Party	Candidate	Votes	%	±%
Liberal Democrats	Patricia Webster	1,027	51.8	+22.6
Conservative	Peter Jones	954	48.2	−4.0
Majority		73	3.6	
Turnout		1,981	26.0	
Liberal Democrats gain from Conservative		Swing		

Saltings by-election 3 July 2003
Party	Candidate	Votes	%	±%
Conservative	Robert Dunn	1,145	59.9	+13.2
Liberal Democrats	Mark O'Keeffe	420	22.0	−2.0
Labour	Adrienne Lowe	346	18.1	−11.1
Majority		725	37.9	
Turnout		1,911	20.9	
Conservative hold		Swing		

Roffey by-election 10 June 2004
Party	Candidate	Votes	%	±%
Liberal Democrats	Anthony Hull	1,652	44.9	−1.9
Conservative	John Charles	1,575	42.8	+4.5
Labour	Richard Wilson	454	12.3	−2.6
Majority		77	2.1	
Turnout		3,681	42.9	
Liberal Democrats hold		Swing		

=== 2005-2009 ===
Angmering & Findon by-election 1 June 2006
Party	Candidate	Votes	%	±%
Conservative	Deborah Urquhart	1,500	75.6	+25.4
Liberal Democrats	Trevor Richards	334	16.8	−21.0
Labour	James Field	149	7.5	+7.5
Majority		1,166	58.8	
Turnout		1,983	25.8	
Conservative hold		Swing		

Southwick by-election 14 September 2006
Party	Candidate	Votes	%	±%
Conservative	Janet Mockridge	907	55.5	+15.4
Labour	Andrew Bray	316	19.4	−9.6
Liberal Democrats	James Doyle	314	19.2	−0.3
Green	Susan Board	96	5.9	+0.9
Majority		591	36.1	
Turnout		1,633	21.0	
Conservative hold		Swing		

Cuckfield and Lucastes by-election 3 May 2007
Party	Candidate	Votes	%	±%
Conservative	Peter Bradbury	2,020	61.3	+8.3
Liberal Democrats	Stephen Blanch	1,274	38.7	+7.4
Majority		746	22.6	
Turnout		3,358	45.41	−27.39
Conservative hold		Swing		

Petworth by-election 7 June 2007
Party	Candidate	Votes	%	±%
Conservative	Chris Duncton	1,437	72.0	+17.8
Liberal Democrats	Raymond Cooper	346	17.3	=13.0
BNP	Andrew Emerson	213	10.7	+10.7
Majority		1,091	54.7	
Turnout		2,002	21.12	−48.60
Conservative hold		Swing		

=== 2009-2013 ===
East Grinstead South & Ashurst Wood bye-election, 6 May 2010
Party	Candidate	Votes	%	±%
Conservative	John O'Brien	2,878	48.2	+3.7
Liberal Democrats	Catrin Ingham	2,771	46.4	+6.5
Independent	Robert Wall	328	5.5	N/A
Majority		107	1.8	−1.8
Turnout		5,977	68.5	+27.3
Conservative hold		Swing		

Maidenbower bye-Election, 7 October 2010
Party	Candidate	Votes	%	±%
Conservative	Robert Lanzer	1,036	64.4	−7.9
Labour	Peter Smith	417	26.0	+12.0
Liberal Democrats	Sulu Pandya	82	5.1	−8.6
UKIP	John MacCanna	61	3.8	+3.8
Justice Party	Arshad Khan	12	0.7	+0.7
Majority		619	38.5	−19.8
Turnout		1,609		
Conservative hold		Swing	-10.0	

Midhurst bye-election, 15 November 2012
Party	Candidate	Votes	%	±%
Conservative	John Cherry	1,410	78.2	+9.8
UKIP	Judith Fowler	392	21.8	N/A
Majority		1,018	56.0	+13.9
Turnout		1,900	21.5	−15.8
Conservative hold		Swing		

=== 2013-2017 ===
Storrington bye-election, 26 September 2013
Party	Candidate	Votes	%	±%
Conservative	Philip Circus	1,037	45.9	−2.0
UKIP	John Wallace	729	32.2	−7.8
Liberal Democrats	Nick Hopkinson	364	16.1	+2.0
Green	James Doyle	131	5.8	N/A
Majority		308	13.7	+3.8
Turnout		2,261	22.5	−10.6
Conservative hold		Swing	+2.9	

Warnham & Rusper bye-election, 24 October 2013
Party	Candidate	Votes	%	±%
Conservative	Liz Kitchen	868	58.3	+3.3
UKIP	Geoff Stevens	335	22.5	−7.7
Green	Darrin Green	119	8.0	N/A
Liberal Democrats	Tony Millson	103	6.9	−7.9
Labour	Carol Hayton	63	4.4	N/A
Majority		533	36.8	+12..0
Turnout		1490	20.1	−10.1
Conservative hold		Swing	+5.5	

Haywards Heath East bye-election, 19 December 2013
Party	Candidate	Votes	%	±%
Conservative	Stephen Hillier	649	35.5	+1.7
UKIP	Charles Burrell	576	31.5	+5.1
Labour	Richard Goddard	346	18.9	−2.7
Liberal Democrats	Anne Hall	201	11.0	−8.2
Green	Paul Brown	55	3.0	N/A
Majority		73	4.0	−2.4
Turnout		1832	23.1	−6.6
Conservative hold		Swing	-1.2	

=== 2017-2021 ===
Northgate & West Green by-election 2 May 2019
Party	Candidate	Votes	%	±%
Labour	Karen Sudan	1,293	48.9	
Conservative	Jan Tarrant	839	31.7	
Liberal Democrats	David Anderson	268	10.1	
Green	Richard Kail	246	9.3	
Majority		454	17.2	
Turnout		2,646	30.2	
Labour hold		Swing		

Three Bridges by-election 26 September 2019
Party	Candidate	Votes	%	±%
Conservative	Brenda Burgess	1,102	51.7	
Labour	Angela Malik	628	29.5	
Liberal Democrats	David Anderson	257	12.1	
Green	Danielle Kail	136	6.4	
Justice Party	Arshad Khan	9	0.4	
Majority		474	22.2	
Turnout		2,132	25.2	
Conservative hold		Swing		

Bourne by-election 21 November 2019
Party	Candidate	Votes	%	±%
Conservative	Mike Magill	1,368	48.9	
Liberal Democrats	Andrew Kerry-Bedell	1,009	36.0	
Green	Michael Neville	250	8.9	
Labour	Jane Towers	161	5.8	
Patria	Andrew Emerson	12	0.4	
Majority		359	12.8	
Turnout		2,800	28.8	
Conservative hold		Swing		

=== 2021-2026 ===
Bourne by-election 4 November 2021
Party	Candidate	Votes	%	±%
Liberal Democrats	Andrew Kerry-Bedell	1,180	51.8	+22.8
Conservative	Bob Hayes	893	39.2	−11.7
Green	Ann Stewart	178	7.8	−3.1
Labour	Alan Butcher	25	1.1	−8.1
Majority		287	12.6	
Turnout		2,276		
Liberal Democrats gain from Conservative		Swing		

Worthing West by-election 7 July 2022
Party	Candidate	Votes	%	±%
Labour	Graham McKnight	1,262	52.0	+5.6
Conservative	Michael Cloake	795	32.8	−6.3
Liberal Democrats	Hazel Thorpe	235	9.7	+5.4
Green	Jo Paul	133	5.5	−1.7
Majority		467	19.3	
Turnout		2,425		
Labour hold		Swing		

Felpham by-election 8 September 2022
Party	Candidate	Votes	%	±%
Independent	Jaine Wild	803	43.4	+43.4
Conservative	David Darling	733	39.6	−12.8
Labour	David Meagher	217	11.7	+3.5
Independent	Richard Parker	99	5.3	−14.8
Majority		70	3.8	
Turnout		1,852		
Independent gain from Conservative		Swing		

East Grinstead Meridian by-election 4 May 2023
Party	Candidate	Votes	%	±%
Conservative	John Dabell	1,064	43.6	−10.8
Independent	Norman Mockford	467	19.1	+6.4
Liberal Democrats	Andrew Lane	365	14.9	+2.5
Labour	Timothy Cornell	340	13.9	+3.2
Green	Alex Langridge	207	8.5	−1.3
Majority		597	24.4	
Turnout		2,443		
Conservative hold		Swing		

Midhurst by-election 1 May 2025
Party	Candidate	Votes	%	±%
Liberal Democrats	Yvonne Gravely	1,349	40.1	−17.0
Conservative	Tom Crofts	1,119	33.3	−5.3
Reform	Adam Kirby	662	19.7	+19.7
Green	Adrian Morris	155	4.6	+4.6
Labour	Juliette Reynolds	73	2.2	−2.1
Patria	Andrew Emerson	7	0.2	+0.2
Majority		230	6.8	
Turnout		3,365		
Liberal Democrats hold		Swing		

Horsham Riverside by-election 22 May 2025
Party	Candidate	Votes	%	±%
Liberal Democrats	Louise Potter	1,193	45.7	−0.3
Conservative	David Thompson	569	21.8	−12.8
Reform	Jack Nye	547	21.0	+21.0
Labour	David Hide	181	6.9	−6.7
Green	Jen Nuin Smith	118	4.5	+4.5
Majority		624	23.9	
Turnout		2,608		
Liberal Democrats hold		Swing		

Burgess Hill North by-election 5 June 2025
Party	Candidate	Votes	%	±%
Liberal Democrats	Jane Davey	1,088	40.9	+0.0
Reform	Tim Cooper	707	26.6	+26.6
Conservative	Mustak Miah	618	23.3	−14.9
Green	Paul Woods	153	5.8	−5.4
Labour	Jake Tennant	92	3.5	−6.2
Majority		381	14.3	
Turnout		2,658		
Liberal Democrats hold		Swing		

Hassocks and Burgess Hill South by-election 5 June 2025
Party	Candidate	Votes	%	±%
Liberal Democrats	Erika Woodhurst-Trueman	1,694	55.3	−6.6
Reform	Peter Bradshaw	762	24.9	+24.9
Conservative	Eliza-Jane Brazil	310	10.1	−15.9
Green	Sue Kelly	175	5.7	+5.7
Labour	Martin McCabe	123	4.0	−8.1
Majority		932	30.4	
Turnout		3,064		
Liberal Democrats hold		Swing		

St Leonard's Forest by-election 5 June 2025
Party	Candidate	Votes	%	±%
Liberal Democrats	Sam Raby	644	32.5	+2.2
Reform	Robert Nye	584	29.5	+29.5
Conservative	Damian Stuart	401	20.2	−34.4
Green	Andrew Finnegan	259	13.1	+13.1
Labour	Sara Loewenthal	94	4.7	−10.5
Majority		60	3.0	
Turnout		1,982		
Liberal Democrats gain from Conservative		Swing		
