= 2026 West Sussex County Council election =

2026 English local government election

- 7 May 2026

All 70 seats to West Sussex County Council 36 seats needed for a majority
- Registered: 682,424
- Turnout: 47.1%
| | First party | Second party | Third party |
|---|---|---|---|
| Leader | Gary Markwell | Jay Mercer | Paul Marshall |
| Party | Reform | Liberal Democrats | Conservative |
| Leader's seat | Bersted | Horsham East | Storrington |
| Last election | 0 seats, 0.2% | 10 seats, 19.5% | 48 seats, 46.7% |
| Seats before | 4 | 10 | 40 |
| Seats won | 23 | 23 | 11 |
| Seat change | ▲19 | ▲13 | ▼29 |
| Popular vote | 90,916 | 72,965 | 71,950 |
| Percentage | 28.4% | 22.8% | 22.4% |
| Swing | ▲28.2pp | ▲3.3pp | ▼23.4pp |
| | Fourth party | Fifth party | Sixth party |
| Leader | (Note: Donna Johnson (Local Alliance) was leader of the Green & Independent Alliance group prior to the election, whilst Sarah Sharp was the only Green councillor and did not seek re-election. Ian Davey was selected to lead the Green group after the election.) | Chris Oxlade | Donna Johnson |
| Party | Green | Labour | Local Alliance |
| Leader's seat | | Bewbush & Ifield West (defeated) | Selsey |
| Last election | 1 seat, 10.2% | 9 seats, 19.2% | 1 seat, 3.1% |
| Seats before | 2 | 8 | 1 |
| Seats won | 7 | 5 | 1 |
| Seat change | ▲5 | ▼3 | Steady |
| Popular vote | 45,425 | 31,617 | 1,573 |
| Percentage | 14.2% | 9.9% | 0.5% |
| Swing | ▲4.0pp | ▼9.3pp | ▼0.2pp |
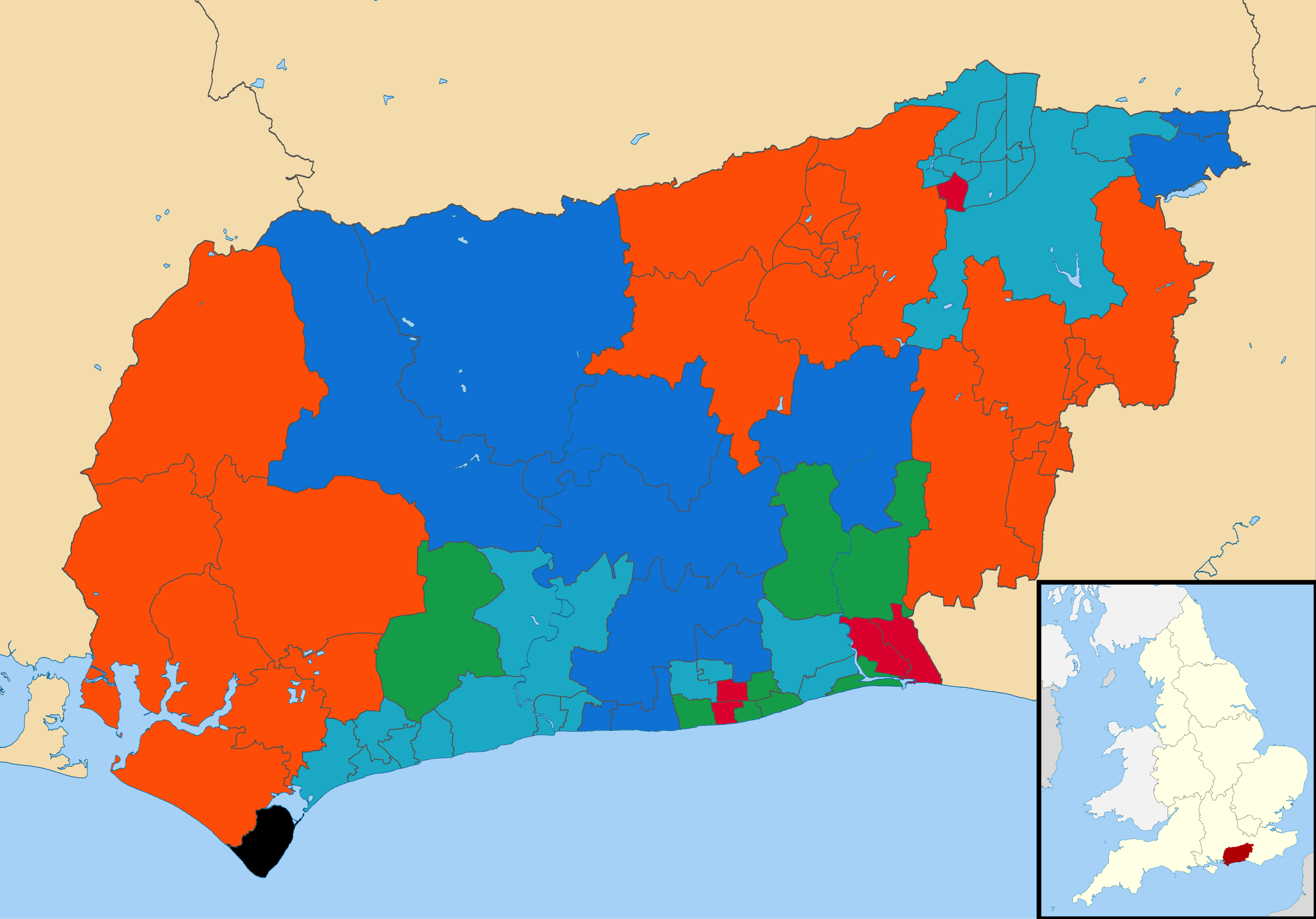
- Winner of each seat at the 2026 West Sussex County Council election.
Leader before election
Paul Marshall
Conservative
Leader after election
Jay Mercer
Liberal Democrats
No overall control (Note: Liberal Democrat–Green–Labour–Local Alliance coalition.)

The 2026 West Sussex County election took place on 7 May 2026 to elect members to West Sussex County Council in West Sussex, England. All 70 seats were elected. This was on the same day as other local elections.

Prior to the election, the council was under Conservative majority control. The election saw the council go under no overall control. Reform UK and the Liberal Democrats were the joint largest parties, each winning 23 seats. A coalition of the Liberal Democrats, Labour, Green Party and Local Alliance formed to run the council, led by Liberal Democrat councillor Jay Mercer. He was formally appointed as the new leader of the council at the subsequent annual council meeting on 22 May 2026.

== Background ==
At the 2021 election, the Conservatives won an outright majority of seats. The election was originally scheduled for May 2025 but was delayed as a result of the Labour government's scheme of local government reorganisation, which will abolish the two-tier system of local government currently present in Sussex.

The County Council election was then scheduled for the 7th May 2026, but was then further delayed until 2027 by the Secretary of State for Housing, Communities and Local Government, Steve Reed in January 2026. This followed a decision in December 2025 to delay the inaugural Sussex Mayoral Election, which was postponed until 2028 to give local government more time to reorganise.

After receiving legal advice stating that a second delay to the elections was unlawful, the Secretary of State reinstated the elections for May 2026.

The elections mark the first time that Reform UK has stood a full slate of candidates with the Liberal Democrats, Labour Party and Green Party all standing their highest number of candidates to date. The Conservative Party is also standing a full slate of candidates.

The election is likely to be the last election to West Sussex County Council, with the authority set to be abolished in 2028 following the elections to new Sussex unitary authorities in 2027.

== Council composition ==
| After 2021 election | | Before 2026 election | |
| Party | Seats | Party | Seats |
|---|---|---|---|
| Conservative | 48 | Conservative | 40 |
| Liberal Democrats | 10 | Liberal Democrats | 10 |
| Labour | 9 | Labour | 8 |
| Green | 1 | Green | 2 (Note: The Green Party, Local Alliance, and an independent form the Green and Independent Alliance group.) |
| Reform | 0 | Reform | 4 |
| Local Alliance | 1 | Local Alliance | 1 |
| Independent | 1 | Independent | 4 |
| Vacant | N/A | Vacant | 1 |

== Election result ==
2026 West Sussex County Council election
| Party | Candidates | Seats | Gains | Losses | Net gain/loss | Seats % | Votes % | Votes | +/− |
|---|---|---|---|---|---|---|---|---|---|
| Reform | 70 | 23 | 22 | 3 | ▲19 | 32.9 | 28.4 | 90,916 | +28.2 |
| Liberal Democrats | 69 | 23 | 15 | 2 | ▲13 | 32.9 | 22.8 | 72,965 | +3.3 |
| Conservative | 70 | 11 | 0 | 29 | ▼29 | 15.7 | 22.4 | 71,950 | –23.4 |
| Green | 69 | 7 | 7 | 2 | ▲5 | 10.0 | 14.2 | 45,425 | +4.0 |
| Labour | 68 | 5 | 3 | 6 | ▼3 | 7.1 | 9.9 | 31,617 | –9.3 |
| Local Alliance | 1 | 1 | 0 | 0 | Steady | 1.4 | 0.5 | 1,573 | –0.2 |
| Independent | 9 | 0 | 0 | 5 | ▼5 | 0.0 | 1.9 | 5,946 | –1.2 |
| English Democrat | 1 | 0 | 0 | 0 | Steady | 0.0 | <0.1 | 63 | N/A |
| Pirate | 1 | 0 | 0 | 0 | Steady | 0.0 | <0.1 | 58 | N/A |
| Peace | 1 | 0 | 0 | 0 | Steady | 0.0 | <0.1 | 57 | –0.1 |
| Monster Raving Loony | 1 | 0 | 0 | 0 | Steady | 0.0 | <0.1 | 52 | N/A |
| Libertarian | 1 | 0 | 0 | 0 | Steady | 0.0 | <0.1 | 19 | ±0.0 |
| Patria | 1 | 0 | 0 | 0 | Steady | 0.0 | <0.1 | 12 | N/A |

== Results by division ==
=== Adur ===
==== District summary ====
Adur district summary
| Party | Seats | +/- | Votes | % | +/- |
|---|---|---|---|---|---|
| Reform | 2 | ▲2 | 6,572 | 28.7 | N/A |
| Labour | 2 | ▲2 | 5,347 | 23.3 | –10.0 |
| Green | 1 | ▲1 | 4,272 | 18.6 | +7.4 |
| Conservative | 0 | ▼5 | 3,311 | 14.4 | –32.5 |
| Independent | 0 | Steady | 2,071 | 9.0 | N/A |
| Liberal Democrats | 0 | Steady | 1,343 | 5.9 | –2.4 |
| Total | 5 | Steady | 22,985 | 46.9 | |
| Registered electors | | | 49,003 | – | |

==== Division results ====
Lancing
| Party | Candidate | Votes | % | ±% |
|---|---|---|---|---|
| Reform | Mike Mendoza | 1,671 | 36.8 | N/A |
| Labour Co-op | Nigel Robert Sweet | 1,122 | 24.7 | −11.3 |
| Conservative | James Martin Butcher | 712 | 15.7 | −33.1 |
| Green | Connor James Ranahan | 645 | 14.2 | +6.9 |
| Liberal Democrats | Ashley Ridley | 396 | 8.7 | +0.8 |
| Majority | | 549 | 12.8 | N/A |
| Turnout | | 4,546 | 44.0 | +10.6 |
| Registered electors | | 10,342 | | |
| Reform gain from Conservative | | | | |

Shoreham North
| Party | Candidate | Votes | % | ±% |
|---|---|---|---|---|
| Labour Co-op | Adrienne Lowe | 1,607 | 34.3 | −3.1 |
| Reform | Nigel Hepworth | 1,209 | 25.8 | N/A |
| Conservative | Tony Nicklen | 773 | 16.5 | −25.1 |
| Green | Angie Buhl-Nielsen | 742 | 15.8 | +6.7 |
| Liberal Democrats | William Harpley | 337 | 7.2 | −4.4 |
| Majority | | 398 | 8.5 | N/A |
| Turnout | | 4,686 | 46.7 | +7.6 |
| Registered electors | | 10,041 | | |
| Labour Co-op gain from Conservative | | | | |

Shoreham South
| Party | Candidate | Votes | % | ±% |
|---|---|---|---|---|
| Green | Gerry Thompson | 1,673 | 31.5 | +11.0 |
| Independent | Joss Loader | 1,273 | 24.0 | N/A |
| Reform | Joe Pannell | 999 | 18.8 | N/A |
| Labour | Vikki Fryer | 716 | 13.5 | −21.4 |
| Conservative | Bob Towner | 438 | 8.2 | −29.6 |
| Liberal Democrats | Ian Jones | 215 | 4.0 | −2.8 |
| Majority | | 400 | 7.5 | N/A |
| Turnout | | 5,333 | 55.7 | +9.2 |
| Registered electors | | 9,574 | | |
| Green gain from Conservative | | | | |

Sompting and North Lancing
| Party | Candidate | Votes | % | ±% |
|---|---|---|---|---|
| Reform | Jim Doubtfire | 1,653 | 36.4 | N/A |
| Independent | Carson Albury | 681 | 15.0 | N/A |
| Labour Co-op | Saffa Jan | 661 | 14.6 | −7.2 |
| Conservative | Matt Fry | 624 | 13.7 | −45.1 |
| Green | Effy Walsh | 600 | 13.2 | +4.5 |
| Liberal Democrats | David Thompson | 185 | 4.1 | −4.4 |
| Independent | Paul Mansfield | 117 | 2.6 | N/A |
| Majority | | 972 | 21.4 | N/A |
| Turnout | | 4,539 | 45.2 | +11.7 |
| Registered electors | | 10,039 | | |
| Reform gain from Conservative | | | | |

- Sompting and North Lancing is the division with the largest number of candidates standing.

Southwick
| Party | Candidate | Votes | % | ±% |
|---|---|---|---|---|
| Labour | Nigel Corston | 1,241 | 32.1 | −2.8 |
| Reform | Rhys Grinstead | 1040 | 26.9 | N/A |
| Conservative | Leila Williams | 764 | 19.8 | −31.1 |
| Green | Helen Mears | 612 | 15.8 | +8.3 |
| Liberal Democrats | Keith Humphrey | 210 | 5.4 | −1.2 |
| Majority | | 201 | 5.2 | N/A |
| Turnout | | 3,881 | 43.1 | +9.6 |
| Registered electors | | 9,007 | | |
| Labour gain from Conservative | | | | |

=== Arun ===
==== District summary ====
Arun district summary
| Party | Seats | +/- | Votes | % | +/- |
|---|---|---|---|---|---|
| Reform | 9 | ▲9 | 20,693 | 35.6 | N/A |
| Conservative | 3 | ▼8 | 14,696 | 25.3 | –25.1 |
| Green | 1 | ▲1 | 7,502 | 12.9 | +3.9 |
| Liberal Democrats | 0 | ▼2 | 9,163 | 15.8 | –4.4 |
| Labour | 0 | Steady | 4,217 | 7.3 | –4.1 |
| Independent | 0 | Steady | 1,792 | 3.1 | –5.2 |
| English Democrat | 0 | Steady | 63 | 0.1 | N/A |
| Total | 13 | Steady | 58,245 | 44.7 | |
| Registered electors | | | 130,184 | – | |

==== Division results ====
Angmering and Findon
| Party | Candidate | Votes | % | ±% |
|---|---|---|---|---|
| Conservative | Deborah Urquhart* | 1,653 | 34.0 | −21.7 |
| Reform | Lionel Harman | 1,515 | 31.2 | N/A |
| Green | Samuel Lovely | 713 | 14.7 | +7.5 |
| Liberal Democrats | Bob Woodman | 514 | 10.6 | −15.7 |
| Labour | Aurora Cheesman | 465 | 9.6 | −1.2 |
| Majority | | 138 | 2.8 | –26.6 |
| Turnout | | 4,867 | 47.6 | |
| Registered electors | | 10,219 | | |
| Conservative hold | | | | |

Arundel and Courtwick
| Party | Candidate | Votes | % | ±% |
|---|---|---|---|---|
| Reform | Frank Bonfield | 1,136 | 31.4 | N/A |
| Conservative | Michael Tu | 1,055 | 29.1 | −23.8 |
| Green | Isabel Thurston | 851 | 23.5 | +10.0 |
| Liberal Democrats | Fran Flammiger | 310 | 8.6 | −11.5 |
| Labour | Michael Ward | 271 | 7.4 | −6.0 |
| Majority | | 81 | 2.3 | N/A |
| Turnout | | 3,640 | 42.8 | |
| Registered electors | | 8,495 | | |
| Reform hold | | | | |

Bersted
| Party | Candidate | Votes | % | ±% |
|---|---|---|---|---|
| Reform | Gary Markwell | 1,801 | 45.8 | N/A |
| Liberal Democrats | Gill Yeates | 1,016 | 25.8 | +2.8 |
| Conservative | Beverley Weddell | 508 | 12.9 | −24.4 |
| Green | Imogen Lysandrou | 361 | 9.2 | N/A |
| Labour Co-op | Simon McDougall | 248 | 6.3 | −8.5 |
| Majority | | 785 | 20.0 | N/A |
| Turnout | | 3,940 | 38.2 | |
| Registered electors | | 10,324 | | |
| Reform gain from Conservative | | | | |

- Gary Markwell was the Conservative County Councillor for Arundel and Courtwick before defecting to Reform UK in September 2024.

Bognor Regis East
| Party | Candidate | Votes | % | ±% |
|---|---|---|---|---|
| Reform | Elizabeth Meadows | 1,284 | 40.2 | N/A |
| Liberal Democrats | Francis Oppler* | 880 | 27.5 | −4.2 |
| Green | Stephen Bennett | 338 | 10.6 | +4.3 |
| Conservative | Andy Cooper | 321 | 10.0 | −18.2 |
| Independent | Steve Goodheart | 217 | 6.8 | −8.3 |
| Labour Co-op | Alison Terry | 158 | 4.9 | −8.2 |
| Majority | | 404 | 12.7 | N/A |
| Turnout | | 3,211 | 33.0 | |
| Registered electors | | 9,736 | | |
| Reform gain from Liberal Democrats | | | | |

Bognor Regis West and Aldwick
| Party | Candidate | Votes | % | ±% |
|---|---|---|---|---|
| Reform | Giuliano Pinnelli | 1,572 | 37.0 | N/A |
| Conservative | Ashvin Patel* | 1,091 | 25.7 | −27.7 |
| Liberal Democrats | Matt Stanley | 879 | 20.7 | −11.9 |
| Green | John Erskine | 416 | 9.8 | N/A |
| Labour Co-op | Ray Palmer | 293 | 6.9 | −7.1 |
| Majority | | 481 | 11.3 | N/A |
| Turnout | | 4,257 | 43.0 | |
| Registered electors | | 9,897 | | |
| Reform gain from Conservative | | | | |

East Preston and Ferring
| Party | Candidate | Votes | % | ±% |
|---|---|---|---|---|
| Conservative | Roger Elkins* | 2,251 | 39.1 | −28.1 |
| Reform | Paul Beckett | 1,824 | 31.7 | N/A |
| Green | Liz Hammond | 677 | 11.8 | +2.8 |
| Liberal Democrats | Tom Manson | 524 | 9.1 | −1.0 |
| Labour | Dominic Ford | 484 | 8.4 | −2.0 |
| Majority | | 427 | 7.4 | –49.4 |
| Turnout | | 5,773 | 56.0 | |
| Registered electors | | 10,311 | | |
| Conservative hold | | | | |

Felpham
| Party | Candidate | Votes | % | ±% |
|---|---|---|---|---|
| Reform | David Darling | 1,598 | 37.2 | N/A |
| Independent | Jaine Wild* | 1,575 | 36.7 | N/A |
| Conservative | Paul Bicknell | 772 | 18.0 | −34.4 |
| Labour Co-op | Kate Claisse | 347 | 8.1 | −0.1 |
| Majority | | 23 | 0.5 | N/A |
| Turnout | | 4,304 | 45.3 | |
| Registered electors | | 9,499 | | |
| Reform gain from Independent | | | | |

* Felpham is the only division in West Sussex where the Liberal Democrats and Green Party are not standing a candidate.

Fontwell
| Party | Candidate | Votes | % | ±% |
|---|---|---|---|---|
| Green | Sue Wallsgrove | 1,881 | 33.8 | −1.9 |
| Reform | David Claydon | 1,876 | 33.7 | N/A |
| Conservative | Mario Trabucco | 1,152 | 20.7 | −29.2 |
| Liberal Democrats | Thomas Worth | 494 | 8.9 | N/A |
| Labour | Deborah See | 167 | 3.0 | −7.9 |
| Majority | | 5 | 0.1 | N/A |
| Turnout | | 5,570 | 46.6 | +14.8 |
| Registered electors | | 11,940 | | |
| Green gain from Reform | | | | |

Littlehampton East
| Party | Candidate | Votes | % | ±% |
|---|---|---|---|---|
| Reform | Paul Cornford | 1,448 | 33.7 | N/A |
| Liberal Democrats | James Walsh* | 1,353 | 31.5 | −15.1 |
| Conservative | Shaun Gunner | 743 | 17.3 | −20.7 |
| Green | Eva Holmberg | 432 | 10.0 | +4.1 |
| Labour | Maralyn May | 321 | 7.5 | −1.9 |
| Majority | | 95 | 2.2 | N/A |
| Turnout | | 4,307 | 42.8 | |
| Registered electors | | 10,063 | | |
| Reform gain from Liberal Democrats | | | | |

Littlehampton Town
| Party | Candidate | Votes | % | ±% |
|---|---|---|---|---|
| Reform | Ricky Borrett | 1,299 | 33.9 | N/A |
| Labour Co-op | Clare Walsh | 770 | 20.1 | −5.9 |
| Conservative | David Chace | 633 | 16.5 | −20.5 |
| Liberal Democrats | Billy Blanchard-Cooper | 627 | 16.4 | −0.9 |
| Green | Anita Lawrence | 501 | 13.1 | +5.4 |
| Majority | | 529 | 13.8 | N/A |
| Turnout | | 3,837 | 39.1 | |
| Registered electors | | 9,803 | | |
| Reform gain from Conservative | | | | |

Middleton
| Party | Candidate | Votes | % | ±% |
|---|---|---|---|---|
| Reform | Alison Littleboy | 1,723 | 37.3 | N/A |
| Conservative | Jacky Pendleton* | 1,374 | 29.8 | −25.6 |
| Liberal Democrats | Amanda Worne | 849 | 18.4 | −13.1 |
| Green | Rebekah Humphrey-Bullen | 451 | 9.8 | +3.5 |
| Labour Co-op | Paul Austin | 220 | 4.8 | −0.6 |
| Majority | | 349 | 7.5 | N/A |
| Turnout | | 4,624 | 44.1 | |
| Registered electors | | 10,474 | | |
| Reform gain from Conservative | | | | |

Nyetimber
| Party | Candidate | Votes | % | ±% |
|---|---|---|---|---|
| Reform | Trevor Bence | 2,160 | 45.6 | N/A |
| Liberal Democrats | Fiona Huntley | 1,140 | 24.0 | N/A |
| Conservative | Dawn Hall* | 915 | 19.3 | −25.2 |
| Green | Carol Birch | 393 | 8.3 | −0.9 |
| Labour Co-op | Michelle White | 133 | 2.8 | −3.5 |
| Majority | | 1,020 | 21.5 | N/A |
| Turnout | | 4,752 | 49.3 | |
| Registered electors | | 9,638 | | |
| Reform gain from Conservative | | | | |

* Trevor William Bence was the Conservative County Councillor for Fontwell before defecting to Reform UK in October 2024

Rustington
| Party | Candidate | Votes | % | ±% |
|---|---|---|---|---|
| Conservative | Alison Cooper* | 2,228 | 43.2 | −21.4 |
| Reform | Michael Warren | 1457 | 28.3 | N/A |
| Liberal Democrats | David Tilbrook | 577 | 11.2 | −8.2 |
| Green | Gavin Graham | 488 | 9.5 | +3.4 |
| Labour | Gareth Jones | 340 | 6.6 | −3.3 |
| English Democrat | John Barrow | 63 | 1.2 | N/A |
| Majority | | 771 | 14.9 | –30.3 |
| Turnout | | 5,163 | 52.8 | |
| Registered electors | | 9,785 | | |
| Conservative hold | | | | |

=== Chichester ===
==== District summary ====
Chichester district summary
| Party | Seats | +/- | Votes | % | +/- |
|---|---|---|---|---|---|
| Liberal Democrats | 7 | ▲6 | 18,705 | 39.4 | +18.2 |
| Conservative | 2 | ▼3 | 11,351 | 23.9 | –24.9 |
| Local Alliance | 1 | Steady | 1,573 | 3.3 | –1.7 |
| Reform | 0 | Steady | 11,241 | 23.7 | +23.5 |
| Green | 0 | ▼2 | 3,601 | 7.6 | –5.5 |
| Labour | 0 | Steady | 1,002 | 2.1 | –6.3 |
| Libertarian | 0 | Steady | 19 | <0.1 | N/A |
| Independent | 0 | ▼1 | N/A (Note: Did not stand candidates.) | N/A | –3.2 |
| Total | 10 | Steady | 47,588 | 48.9 | |
| Registered electors | | | 97,232 | – | |

==== Division results ====
Bourne
| Party | Candidate | Votes | % | ±% |
|---|---|---|---|---|
| Liberal Democrats | Tracie Bangert | 2,485 | 49.1 | +20.1 |
| Reform | Charlotte Sleep | 1,275 | 25.2 | N/A |
| Conservative | Bill Mills | 791 | 15.6 | −35.3 |
| Green | Antoine Delepine | 379 | 7.5 | −3.4 |
| Labour | Gail Adams | 122 | 2.4 | −6.8 |
| Majority | | 1,210 | 23.9 | N/A |
| Turnout | | 5,058 | 47.6 | |
| Registered electors | | 10,629 | | |
| Liberal Democrats gain from Green | | | | |

Chichester East
| Party | Candidate | Votes | % | ±% |
|---|---|---|---|---|
| Liberal Democrats | Matthew Hedge | 1,918 | 45.3 | +19.9 |
| Reform | Tracy White | 1,123 | 26.5 | N/A |
| Conservative | Simon Oakley* | 641 | 15.1 | −34.8 |
| Green | Juliette Flack | 374 | 8.8 | N/A |
| Labour | Evelyn Falla | 168 | 4.0 | −20.3 |
| Majority | | 795 | 18.8 | N/A |
| Turnout | | 4,234 | 41.3 | |
| Registered electors | | 10,240 | | |
| Liberal Democrats gain from Conservative | | | | |

Chichester North
| Party | Candidate | Votes | % | ±% |
|---|---|---|---|---|
| Liberal Democrats | Jack Lovejoy | 2,436 | 45.4 | +22.3 |
| Conservative | Jeremy Hunt* | 1,436 | 26.7 | −25.0 |
| Reform | Damian Purcell | 964 | 18.0 | N/A |
| Green | Billy Nicholls | 402 | 7.5 | −5.1 |
| Labour | Philip White | 118 | 2.2 | −10.4 |
| Majority | | 1,000 | 18.7 | N/A |
| Turnout | | 5,369 | 51.0 | |
| Registered electors | | 10,520 | | |
| Liberal Democrats gain from Conservative | | Swing | ▲23.7 | |

Chichester South
| Party | Candidate | Votes | % | ±% |
|---|---|---|---|---|
| Liberal Democrats | Nick Russell | 2,069 | 44.5 | N/A |
| Reform | Kate Eccles | 1,041 | 22.4 | N/A |
| Green | Benedict Targett | 791 | 17.0 | −40.3 |
| Conservative | Kasra Aarabi | 616 | 13.2 | −13.0 |
| Labour | Heather Smith | 114 | 2.5 | N/A |
| Patria | Andrew Emerson | 12 | 0.3 | N/A |
| Majority | | 1,028 | 22.1 | N/A |
| Turnout | | 4,651 | 48.1 | |
| Registered electors | | 9,664 | | |
| Liberal Democrats gain from Green | | | | |

Chichester West
| Party | Candidate | Votes | % | ±% |
|---|---|---|---|---|
| Liberal Democrats | Richard Bates | 3,106 | 57.2 | +21.9 |
| Reform | Timothy Reedman | 1,040 | 19.2 | N/A |
| Conservative | Joseph Stevens | 816 | 15.0 | −20.3 |
| Green | Jez Sugars | 328 | 6 | N/A |
| Labour | Geoffrey Brome Thompson | 125 | 2.3 | −8.2 |
| Majority | | 2,066 | 38.0 | N/A |
| Turnout | | 5,427 | 51.1 | |
| Registered electors | | 10,610 | | |
| Liberal Democrats gain from Independent | | | | |

Midhurst
| Party | Candidate | Votes | % | ±% |
|---|---|---|---|---|
| Liberal Democrats | Yvonne Gravely* | 1,759 | 40.3 | −16.8 |
| Conservative | Francis Hobbs | 1,385 | 31.7 | −6.9 |
| Reform | Alan Chapman | 903 | 20.7 | N/A |
| Green | Philip Maber | 227 | 5.2 | N/A |
| Labour | David Wise | 63 | 1.4 | −2.9 |
| Libertarian | Alex Zychowski | 19 | 0.4 | N/A |
| Majority | | 374 | 8.6 | N/A |
| Turnout | | 4,366 | 50.0 | |
| Registered electors | | 8,731 | | |
| Liberal Democrats hold | | Swing | ▼5.0 | |

Petworth
| Party | Candidate | Votes | % | ±% |
|---|---|---|---|---|
| Conservative | Janet Duncton* | 2,063 | 39.6 | −27.2 |
| Liberal Democrats | Harsha Desai | 1,437 | 27.6 | +12.9 |
| Reform | Peter Wilding | 1,309 | 25.1 | N/A |
| Green | Tim Elwell | 285 | 5.5 | −4.1 |
| Labour | Alwyn Dow | 103 | 2 | −6.9 |
| Majority | | 626 | 12.0 | –40.1 |
| Turnout | | 5,206 | 52.3 | |
| Registered electors | | 9,962 | | |
| Conservative hold | | Swing | ▼20.1 | |

Rother Valley
| Party | Candidate | Votes | % | ±% |
|---|---|---|---|---|
| Conservative | Tom Richardson* | 2,007 | 43.3 | −18.4 |
| Liberal Democrats | John Cross | 1,311 | 28.3 | +16.3 |
| Reform | Daniel Hall | 770 | 16.6 | N/A |
| Green | Ginny Barrett | 437 | 9.4 | −9.7 |
| Labour | Roger Pask | 101 | 2.2 | −5.1 |
| Majority | | 696 | 15.0 | –27.6 |
| Turnout | | 4,633 | 52.0 | |
| Registered electors | | 8,904 | | |
| Conservative hold | | Swing | ▼17.4 | |

Selsey
| Party | Candidate | Votes | % | ±% |
|---|---|---|---|---|
| Local Alliance | Donna Johnson* | 1,573 | 39.6 | −20.5 |
| Reform | Matt Davison | 1,455 | 36.6 | N/A |
| Conservative | Tom Bromfield | 448 | 11.3 | −28.6 |
| Liberal Democrats | Rhys Chant | 311 | 7.8 | N/A |
| Green | Claire Byrne | 179 | 4.5 | N/A |
| Majority | | 118 | 3.0 | –17.2 |
| Turnout | | 3,970 | 45.4 | |
| Registered electors | | 8,741 | | |
| Local Alliance hold | | | | |

- Selsey is one of only two divisions in West Sussex where the Labour Party is not standing a candidate

The Witterings
| Party | Candidate | Votes | % | ±% |
|---|---|---|---|---|
| Liberal Democrats | Izabela Mayne | 1,873 | 40.1 | +30.7 |
| Reform | Martin Silcocks | 1,361 | 29.1 | N/A |
| Conservative | Patrick Byrne | 1,148 | 24.6 | −40.4 |
| Green | Andrew Swain | 199 | 4.3 | −10.7 |
| Labour | Joe O'Sullivan | 88 | 1.9 | −7.3 |
| Majority | | 512 | 11.0 | N/A |
| Turnout | | 4,674 | 50.6 | |
| Registered electors | | 9,231 | | |
| Liberal Democrats gain from Conservative | | Swing | | |

=== Crawley ===
==== Borough summary ====
Crawley borough summary
| Party | Seats | +/- | Votes | % | +/- |
|---|---|---|---|---|---|
| Reform | 8 | ▲8 | 11,948 | 33.5 | +33.2 |
| Labour | 1 | ▼3 | 8,439 | 23.6 | –14.9 |
| Conservative | 0 | ▼5 | 7,827 | 21.9 | –25.4 |
| Green | 0 | Steady | 5,202 | 14.6 | +7.8 |
| Liberal Democrats | 0 | Steady | 2,132 | 6.0 | ±0.0 |
| Independent | 0 | Steady | 144 | 0.4 | –0.7 |
| Total | 9 | Steady | 35,884 | 42.5 | |
| Registered electors | | | 84,338 | – | |

==== Division results ====
Bewbush and Ifield West
| Party | Candidate | Votes | % | ±% |
|---|---|---|---|---|
| Reform | Grainne Conway | 1,242 | 36.1 | N/A |
| Labour | Chris Oxlade* | 915 | 26.5 | −20.7 |
| Conservative | Tina Belben | 493 | 14.3 | −22.1 |
| Green | Holly Smith | 465 | 13.5 | +0.7 |
| Liberal Democrats | Lawrence Mallinson | 179 | 5.2 | +1.8 |
| Independent | Richard Symonds | 144 | 4.2 | N/A |
| Majority | | 327 | 9.6 | N/A |
| Turnout | | 3,448 | 38.1 | |
| Registered electors | | 9,057 | | |
| Reform gain from Labour | | | | |

Broadfield
| Party | Candidate | Votes | % | ±% |
|---|---|---|---|---|
| Labour | Brian Quinn* | 1,143 | 33.55 | −19.0 |
| Reform | Marie Mariette | 1,142 | 33.52 | N/A |
| Conservative | David Bowen | 480 | 14.1 | −24.2 |
| Green | Matt O'Brien | 469 | 13.8 | N/A |
| Liberal Democrats | Rachael Colbran | 173 | 5.1 | −4.1 |
| Majority | | 1 | 0.03 | –14.17 |
| Turnout | | 3,434 | 37.1 | |
| Registered electors | | 9,262 | | |
| Labour hold | | | | |

Langley Green and Ifield East
| Party | Candidate | Votes | % | ±% |
|---|---|---|---|---|
| Reform | Oliver Pickstock | 1,364 | 34.1 | N/A |
| Labour | Tahira Rana | 1,166 | 29.0 | −12.5 |
| Green | Karen Sudan | 641 | 15.9 | +9.2 |
| Conservative | Valerie Knight | 616 | 15.3 | −21.8 |
| Liberal Democrats | Kemuel Thompson | 212 | 5.3 | −8.9 |
| Majority | | 198 | 5.1 | N/A |
| Turnout | | 4,026 | 40.1 | |
| Registered electors | | 10,046 | | |
| Reform gain from Labour | | Swing | | |

Maidenbower and Worth
| Party | Candidate | Votes | % | ±% |
|---|---|---|---|---|
| Reform | Riszard Rzepa | 1,441 | 32.6 | N/A |
| Conservative | Bob Lanzer* | 1,367 | 30.9 | −33.6 |
| Green | Cyril Gambrell | 586 | 13.2 | +4.1 |
| Labour | Yolanda Geer | 578 | 13.1 | −8.9 |
| Liberal Democrats | Sarah Smith | 439 | 9.9 | +5.8 |
| Majority | | 74 | 1.7 | N/A |
| Turnout | | 4,427 | 48.8 | |
| Registered electors | | 9,067 | | |
| Reform gain from Conservative | | | | |

Northgate and West Green
| Party | Candidate | Votes | % | ±% |
|---|---|---|---|---|
| Reform | Callum Johnson | 1,199 | 32.9 | N/A |
| Labour | Kiran Khan | 964 | 26.5 | −17.1 |
| Green | Ben Newman | 621 | 17.1 | N/A |
| Conservative | Susan Wheeler | 576 | 15.8 | −22.1 |
| Liberal Democrats | David Anderson | 281 | 7.7 | −0.2 |
| Majority | | 235 | 6.4 | N/A |
| Turnout | | 3,670 | 37.6 | |
| Registered electors | | 9,754 | | |
| Reform gain from Labour | | | | |

Pound Hill
| Party | Candidate | Votes | % | ±% |
|---|---|---|---|---|
| Reform | James Tidy | 1,318 | 32.1 | N/A |
| Conservative | Richard Burrett* | 1,066 | 25.9 | −34.2 |
| Labour Co-op | Nick Hilton | 887 | 21.6 | −5.1 |
| Green | Steph Bonnie | 619 | 15.1 | +4.6 |
| Liberal Democrats | Fidel Kuzamba | 221 | 5.4 | +2.7 |
| Majority | | 252 | 6.2 | N/A |
| Turnout | | 4,129 | 46.7 | |
| Registered electors | | 8,843 | | |
| Reform gain from Conservative | | | | |

Southgate and Gossops Green
| Party | Candidate | Votes | % | ±% |
|---|---|---|---|---|
| Reform | Tim Charters | 1,580 | 35.3 | +33.1 |
| Conservative | Zack Ali* | 1,117 | 24.9 | −20.7 |
| Labour | Yasmin Khan | 917 | 20.5 | −19.8 |
| Green | Iain Dickson | 641 | 14.3 | +8.2 |
| Liberal Democrats | Theo van der Lugt | 198 | 4.4 | −0.8 |
| Majority | | 463 | 10.4 | N/A |
| Turnout | | 4,480 | 44.1 | |
| Registered electors | | 10,166 | | |
| Reform gain from Conservative | | Swing | ▲26.9 | |

Three Bridges
| Party | Candidate | Votes | % | ±% |
|---|---|---|---|---|
| Reform | Emma Whiteoak | 1,111 | 27.8 | N/A |
| Labour | Marilyn Hilton | 1087 | 27.3 | −13.6 |
| Conservative | Thomas Bidwell | 911 | 22.9 | −24.1 |
| Green | Paul Morgan | 658 | 16.5 | +8.3 |
| Liberal Democrats | Stephanie Robinson | 209 | 5.2 | +1.4 |
| Majority | | 24 | 0.5 | N/A |
| Turnout | | 4,000 | 44.5 | |
| Registered electors | | 8,979 | | |
| Reform gain from Labour | | | | |

Tilgate and Furnace Green
| Party | Candidate | Votes | % | ±% |
|---|---|---|---|---|
| Reform | Sarah LeTissier | 1,551 | 36.4 | N/A |
| Conservative | Duncan Crow* | 1,201 | 28.2 | −28.5 |
| Labour | Tony Patel | 782 | 18.4 | −14.8 |
| Green | Callan Gendall | 502 | 11.8 | +4.6 |
| Liberal Democrats | Kevin Osborne | 220 | 5.2 | +2.4 |
| Majority | | 350 | 8.2 | N/A |
| Turnout | | 4,270 | 46.6 | |
| Registered electors | | 9,164 | | |
| Reform gain from Conservative | | | | |

=== Horsham ===
==== District summary ====
Horsham district summary
| Party | Seats | +/- | Votes | % | +/- |
|---|---|---|---|---|---|
| Liberal Democrats | 8 | ▲4 | 18,836 | 33.3 | +5.7 |
| Conservative | 3 | ▼3 | 13,155 | 23.2 | –23.7 |
| Green | 1 | ▲1 | 8,277 | 14.6 | +4.0 |
| Reform | 0 | ▼2 | 14,528 | 25.7 | N/A |
| Labour | 0 | Steady | 1,771 | 3.1 | –11.0 |
| Peace | 0 | Steady | 57 | 0.1 | –0.4 |
| Total | 12 | Steady | 56,750 | 49.6 | |
| Registered electors | | | 114,339 | – | |

==== Division results ====
Billingshurst
| Party | Candidate | Votes | % | ±% |
|---|---|---|---|---|
| Liberal Democrats | Mark Baynham | 1,725 | 33.4 | +14.8 |
| Reform | Tyler Dewey | 1,465 | 28.4 | N/A |
| Conservative | Amanda Jupp* | 1,456 | 28.2 | −24.8 |
| Green | George Imbert | 406 | 7.9 | −1.8 |
| Labour | Rory Raftery | 107 | 2.1 | −16.6 |
| Majority | | 260 | 5.0 | N/A |
| Turnout | | 5,169 | 47.2 | |
| Registered electors | | 10,946 | | |
| Liberal Democrats gain from Conservative | | | | |

Bramber Castle
| Party | Candidate | Votes | % | ±% |
|---|---|---|---|---|
| Green | Victoria Finnegan | 1,788 | 36.8 | +17.1 |
| Conservative | Simon Reed | 1,064 | 21.9 | −21.3 |
| Reform | Simon Leach | 1,046 | 21.5 | N/A |
| Liberal Democrats | Richard Allen | 802 | 16.5 | +0.9 |
| Labour | Tony Flegg | 155 | 3.2 | −18.3 |
| Majority | | 724 | 14.9 | N/A |
| Turnout | | 4,863 | 54.6 | |
| Registered electors | | 8,900 | | |
| Green gain from Reform | | Swing | ▲19.2 | |

Broadbridge
| Party | Candidate | Votes | % | ±% |
|---|---|---|---|---|
| Liberal Democrats | Colin Minto | 1,929 | 39.1 | +11.0 |
| Reform | Robert Nye | 1,326 | 26.9 | N/A |
| Conservative | Christian Mitchell* | 1,185 | 24.0 | −27.2 |
| Green | Catherine Ross | 389 | 7.9 | −4.2 |
| Labour | Kevin O'Sullivan | 105 | 2.1 | −6.5 |
| Majority | | 603 | 12.2 | N/A |
| Turnout | | 4,943 | 49.7 | |
| Registered electors | | 9,953 | | |
| Liberal Democrats gain from Conservative | | | | |

Henfield
| Party | Candidate | Votes | % | ±% |
|---|---|---|---|---|
| Conservative | Roger Noel | 1,333 | 28.8 | −24.5 |
| Green | Jack Masters | 1,251 | 27.0 | +11.7 |
| Reform | Paul Linehan | 1228 | 26.5 | N/A |
| Liberal Democrats | Paul Dittmer | 572 | 12.3 | +4.7 |
| Labour | Fiona Ayres | 248 | 5.3 | −18.4 |
| Majority | | 82 | 1.8 | –27.7 |
| Turnout | | 4,641 | 52.1 | |
| Registered electors | | 8,904 | | |
| Conservative hold | | Swing | ▼18.1 | |

Holbrook
| Party | Candidate | Votes | % | ±% |
|---|---|---|---|---|
| Liberal Democrats | Steve Makin | 2,152 | 47.0 | +4.6 |
| Reform | Tony Rickett | 1,140 | 24.9 | N/A |
| Conservative | Simon Torn | 831 | 18.1 | −27.7 |
| Green | Florian Yeates | 304 | 6.6 | N/A |
| Labour | Michael Gaylard | 155 | 3.4 | −8.5 |
| Majority | | 1,012 | 22.1 | N/A |
| Turnout | | 4595 | 50.3 | |
| Registered electors | | 9,140 | | |
| Liberal Democrats gain from Reform | | | | |

Horsham East
| Party | Candidate | Votes | % | ±% |
|---|---|---|---|---|
| Liberal Democrats | Jay Mercer | 2,071 | 49.1 | +7.9 |
| Reform | Jack Nye | 969 | 23.0 | N/A |
| Conservative | Aaron Courteney-Smith | 726 | 17.2 | −21.2 |
| Green | Morag Warrack | 330 | 7.8 | −0.6 |
| Labour | Gerard Kavanagh | 118 | 2.8 | −9.2 |
| Majority | | 1,102 | 26.1 | +23.3 |
| Turnout | | 4,222 | 48.1 | |
| Registered electors | | 8,774 | | |
| Liberal Democrats hold | | | | |

Horsham Hurst
| Party | Candidate | Votes | % | ±% |
|---|---|---|---|---|
| Liberal Democrats | Nigel Dennis* | 2,708 | 58.9 | −0.5 |
| Reform | Fenella Humphreys | 721 | 15.7 | N/A |
| Conservative | Charlie Willson | 548 | 12.0 | −13.1 |
| Green | Mark Francis | 412 | 9.0 | N/A |
| Labour | Carol Hayton | 191 | 4.2 | −11.1 |
| Majority | | 1,987 | 43.2 | +8.7 |
| Turnout | | 4,595 | 50.3 | |
| Registered electors | | 9,138 | | |
| Liberal Democrats hold | | | | |

Horsham Riverside
| Party | Candidate | Votes | % | ±% |
|---|---|---|---|---|
| Liberal Democrats | Louise Potter* | 2,024 | 48.9 | +2.9 |
| Reform | Edward Richards | 893 | 21.6 | N/A |
| Conservative | David Thompson | 647 | 15.6 | −19.0 |
| Green | Samantha Taylor | 371 | 9.0 | N/A |
| Labour | David Hide | 151 | 3.6 | −10.0 |
| Peace | Jim Duggan | 57 | 1.4 | −4.4 |
| Majority | | 1,131 | 27.3 | +15.9 |
| Turnout | | 4,160 | 43.8 | |
| Registered electors | | 9,498 | | |
| Liberal Democrats hold | | | | |

Pulborough
| Party | Candidate | Votes | % | ±% |
|---|---|---|---|---|
| Conservative | Tom Crofts | 1,872 | 35.4 | −22.4 |
| Reform | Verity Webster | 1,498 | 28.3 | N/A |
| Green | Edward Owen-Burge | 931 | 17.6 | N/A |
| Liberal Democrats | Sarah Ullman | 826 | 15.6 | +1.9 |
| Labour | William Ashton | 167 | 3.1 | −7.8 |
| Majority | | 374 | 7.1 | N/A |
| Turnout | | 5,306 | 52.0 | |
| Registered electors | | 10,195 | | |
| Conservative hold | | | | |

Southwater and Nuthurst
| Party | Candidate | Votes | % | ±% |
|---|---|---|---|---|
| Liberal Democrats | Alexander Jeffery | 2,191 | 43.2 | +12.9 |
| Reform | Simon Clare | 1,409 | 27.8 | N/A |
| Conservative | Nigel Jupp* | 1,062 | 21.0 | −28.2 |
| Green | Jen Nuin Smith | 301 | 5.9 | −5.6 |
| Labour | Christopher Henson | 106 | 2.1 | −6.9 |
| Majority | | 782 | 15.4 | N/A |
| Turnout | | 5,075 | 50.6 | |
| Registered electors | | 10,026 | | |
| Liberal Democrats gain from Conservative | | | | |

St Leonards Forest
| Party | Candidate | Votes | % | ±% |
|---|---|---|---|---|
| Liberal Democrats | Sam Raby* | 1,421 | 37.4 | +7.1 |
| Reform | Tony Hogben | 1,281 | 33.7 | N/A |
| Conservative | Damian Stuart | 715 | 18.7 | −35.8 |
| Green | Claire Adcock | 274 | 7.2 | N/A |
| Labour | Sara Loewenthal | 110 | 2.9 | −12.3 |
| Majority | | 140 | 3.7 | N/A |
| Turnout | | 3,814 | 44.5 | |
| Registered electors | | 8,570 | | |
| Liberal Democrats hold | | | | |

Storrington
| Party | Candidate | Votes | % | ±% |
|---|---|---|---|---|
| Conservative | Paul Marshall* | 1,716 | 32.0 | −24.9 |
| Reform | Joanna Wileman | 1,552 | 28.9 | N/A |
| Green | John Loney | 1,520 | 28.4 | ±0.0 |
| Liberal Democrats | Alex Beveridge | 415 | 7.7 | +2.2 |
| Labour | Paul Summers | 158 | 2.9 | −6.3 |
| Majority | | 164 | 3.1 | –25.4 |
| Turnout | | 5,367 | 52.1 | |
| Registered electors | | 10,305 | | |
| Conservative hold | | | | |

=== Mid Sussex ===
==== District summary ====
Mid Sussex district summary
| Party | Seats | +/- | Votes | % | +/- |
|---|---|---|---|---|---|
| Liberal Democrats | 8 | ▲5 | 19,035 | 32.8 | +4.0 |
| Reform | 2 | ▲2 | 14,746 | 25.4 | +24.5 |
| Conservative | 2 | ▼6 | 13,698 | 23.6 | –19.0 |
| Green | 0 | Steady | 6,703 | 11.5 | +0.6 |
| Independent | 0 | ▼1 | 1,939 | 3.3 | –2.3 |
| Labour | 0 | Steady | 1,836 | 3.2 | –7.5 |
| Pirate | 0 | Steady | 58 | 0.1 | N/A |
| Monster Raving Loony | 0 | Steady | 52 | 0.1 | –0.2 |
| Total | 12 | Steady | 58,183 | 47.7 | |
| Registered electors | | | 121,930 | – | |

==== Division results ====
Burgess Hill East
| Party | Candidate | Votes | % | ±% |
|---|---|---|---|---|
| Liberal Democrats | Richard Cherry* | 1,919 | 38.6 | −4.4 |
| Reform | Archie Sheail | 1,210 | 24.3 | +22.0 |
| Conservative | Sebastian Monk | 957 | 19.3 | −17.6 |
| Green | Colin Clark | 684 | 13.8 | +5.6 |
| Labour | Jake Tennant | 201 | 4.0 | −5.6 |
| Majority | | 709 | 14.3 | +8.2 |
| Turnout | | 4,982 | 45.9 | |
| Registered electors | | 10,858 | | |
| Liberal Democrats hold | | Swing | ▼13.2 | |

Burgess Hill North
| Party | Candidate | Votes | % | ±% |
|---|---|---|---|---|
| Liberal Democrats | Jane Davey* | 1,603 | 34.4 | −6.5 |
| Reform | Tim Cooper | 1,298 | 27.9 | N/A |
| Conservative | Mustak Miah | 1,017 | 21.8 | −16.4 |
| Green | Ross Thornton | 550 | 11.8 | +0.6 |
| Labour | Pam Haigh | 130 | 2.8 | −6.9 |
| Pirate | Nathan Griffiths | 58 | 1.2 | N/A |
| Majority | | 305 | 6.5 | +3.8 |
| Turnout | | 4,660 | 45.2 | |
| Registered electors | | 10,313 | | |
| Liberal Democrats hold | | | | |

Cuckfield and Lucastes
| Party | Candidate | Votes | % | ±% |
|---|---|---|---|---|
| Liberal Democrats | LaurenLloyd | 2,335 | 45.2 | +25.1 |
| Conservative | Jim Knight | 1,198 | 23.2 | −22.9 |
| Reform | Paul Hollands | 1,038 | 20.1 | +16.3 |
| Green | Bob Foster | 454 | 8.8 | −5.7 |
| Labour | Ian Renshaw | 139 | 2.7 | −12.8 |
| Majority | | 1,137 | 22.0 | N/A |
| Turnout | | 5,175 | 49.6 | |
| Registered electors | | 10,430 | | |
| Liberal Democrats gain from Conservative | | Swing | ▲24.0 | |

East Grinstead Meridian
| Party | Candidate | Votes | % | ±% |
|---|---|---|---|---|
| Conservative | Lorraine Carvalho | 1,248 | 31.4 | −23.0 |
| Reform | Michael Simpson | 1,190 | 29.9 | N/A |
| Green | Alex Langridge | 627 | 15.8 | +6.0 |
| Liberal Democrats | Lee Daniel Gibbs | 505 | 12.7 | +0.3 |
| Independent | Norman Mockford | 250 | 6.3 | −6.4 |
| Labour | Muhammad Uddin | 155 | 3.9 | −6.8 |
| Majority | | 58 | 1.5 | –40.2 |
| Turnout | | 3,984 | 45.3 | |
| Registered electors | | 8,787 | | |
| Conservative hold | | | | |

East Grinstead South and Ashurst Wood
| Party | Candidate | Votes | % | ±% |
|---|---|---|---|---|
| Conservative | Jacquie Russell* | 1,911 | 42.6 | −9.2 |
| Reform | Omar Dawood | 1,134 | 25.3 | +22.5 |
| Liberal Democrats | Vanessa Wilson | 773 | 17.2 | −7.4 |
| Green | Zara Carey | 525 | 11.7 | −0.2 |
| Labour | John Turley | 142 | 3.2 | −5.7 |
| Majority | | 777 | 17.3 | –9.9 |
| Turnout | | 4,499 | 45.4 | |
| Registered electors | | 9,913 | | |
| Conservative hold | | Swing | ▼15.9 | |

Hassocks and Burgess Hill South
| Party | Candidate | Votes | % | ±% |
|---|---|---|---|---|
| Liberal Democrats | Erika Woodhurst-Trueman* | 3,009 | 55.7 | −6.2 |
| Reform | Chris French | 1,198 | 22.2 | N/A |
| Conservative | Toby Dawson | 556 | 10.3 | −15.7 |
| Green | Di Penly | 468 | 8.7 | N/A |
| Labour | Linda Taylor | 175 | 3.2 | −8.9 |
| Majority | | 1,811 | 33.5 | –2.4 |
| Turnout | | 5,415 | 53.4 | |
| Registered electors | | 10,139 | | |
| Liberal Democrats hold | | | | |

Haywards Heath East
| Party | Candidate | Votes | % | ±% |
|---|---|---|---|---|
| Liberal Democrats | Kirsten Sutton | 1,750 | 44.3 | +28.9 |
| Reform | Craig Read | 930 | 23.5 | N/A |
| Conservative | Christian Alexander | 662 | 16.7 | −32.4 |
| Green | Matt Brewin | 423 | 10.7 | −4.3 |
| Labour | Candida Lewis | 188 | 4.7 | −15.7 |
| Majority | | 820 | 20.8 | N/A |
| Turnout | | 3,959 | 44.1 | |
| Registered electors | | 8,968 | | |
| Liberal Democrats gain from Conservative | | | | |

Haywards Heath Town
| Party | Candidate | Votes | % | ±% |
|---|---|---|---|---|
| Liberal Democrats | Caroline Ward | 1,889 | 42.5 | +8.0 |
| Reform | Tom McCulloch | 901 | 20.3 | N/A |
| Conservative | Sujan Wickremaratchi* | 892 | 20.1 | −17.7 |
| Green | Richard Kail | 575 | 12.9 | +2.9 |
| Labour | David Morley | 190 | 4.3 | −10.9 |
| Majority | | 988 | 22.4 | N/A |
| Turnout | | 4,457 | 45.3 | |
| Registered electors | | 9,835 | | |
| Liberal Democrats gain from Conservative | | | | |

Hurstpierpoint and Bolney
| Party | Candidate | Votes | % | ±% |
|---|---|---|---|---|
| Liberal Democrats | Rodney Jackson | 1,862 | 35.9 | +1.7 |
| Reform | Thomas Givons | 1258 | 24.2 | N/A |
| Conservative | Eliza Brazil | 1222 | 23.5 | −17.5 |
| Green | Sue Kelly | 587 | 11.3 | −1.0 |
| Labour | Andrew Foster | 209 | 4.0 | −5.7 |
| Monster Raving Loony | Baron von Thunderclap | 52 | 1.0 | −1.8 |
| Majority | | 604 | 11.7 | N/A |
| Turnout | | 5,200 | 49.3 | |
| Registered electors | | 10,543 | | |
| Liberal Democrats gain from Conservative | | | | |

Imberdown
| Party | Candidate | Votes | % | ±% |
|---|---|---|---|---|
| Reform | Gary Dowsett | 1,425 | 31.3 | N/A |
| Conservative | Liz Williams | 1,146 | 25.2 | −11.9 |
| Independent | Ian Gibson* | 1,129 | 24.8 | −28.3 |
| Liberal Democrats | Stephen Barnett | 384 | 8.4 | N/A |
| Green | Andre Pereira | 338 | 7.4 | N/A |
| Labour | Simon Stone | 134 | 2.9 | −6.2 |
| Majority | | 279 | 6.1 | N/A |
| Turnout | | 4,561 | 49.2 | |
| Registered electors | | 9,263 | | |
| Reform gain from Independent | | | | |

Lindfield and High Weald
| Party | Candidate | Votes | % | ±% |
|---|---|---|---|---|
| Liberal Democrats | Cavan Wood | 2,224 | 39.3 | +9.0 |
| Conservative | Garry Wall* | 1,472 | 26.0 | −17.9 |
| Reform | Paul Vallis | 1,168 | 20.6 | N/A |
| Green | Emma Barker | 620 | 11.0 | −6.0 |
| Labour | Linda Gregory | 173 | 3.1 | −5.7 |
| Majority | | 752 | 13.3 | N/A |
| Turnout | | 5,672 | 53.5 | |
| Registered electors | | 10,598 | | |
| Liberal Democrats gain from Conservative | | Swing | ▲13.5 | |

Worth Forest
| Party | Candidate | Votes | % | ±% |
|---|---|---|---|---|
| Reform | Mel Winn | 1,996 | 35.6 | +33.3 |
| Conservative | Gary Marsh | 1,417 | 25.3 | −32.2 |
| Green | James Lark | 852 | 15.2 | −6.9 |
| Liberal Democrats | Stuart Condie | 782 | 13.9 | +3.9 |
| Independent | Christopher Phillips | 560 | 10.0 | N/A |
| Majority | | 579 | 10.3 | N/A |
| Turnout | | 5,619 | 45.7 | |
| Registered electors | | 12,283 | | |
| Reform gain from Conservative | | Swing | ▲32.8 | |

* Worth Forest is one of only two divisions in West Sussex where the Labour Party is not standing a candidate.

=== Worthing ===
==== Borough summary ====
Worthing borough summary
| Party | Seats | +/- | Votes | % | +/- |
|---|---|---|---|---|---|
| Green | 4 | ▲4 | 9,868 | 23.7 | +13.6 |
| Reform | 2 | ▲2 | 11,188 | 26.8 | N/A |
| Labour | 2 | ▼3 | 9,005 | 21.6 | –12.2 |
| Conservative | 1 | ▼3 | 7,912 | 19.0 | –25.9 |
| Liberal Democrats | 0 | Steady | 3,751 | 9.0 | –1.5 |
| Total | 9 | Steady | 41,965 | 49.1 | |
| Registered electors | | | 85,398 | – | |

==== Division results ====
Broadwater
| Party | Candidate | Votes | % | ±% |
|---|---|---|---|---|
| Green | Jimi Taylor | 1,627 | 35.0 | +26.3 |
| Reform | Stuart James | 1,085 | 23.4 | N/A |
| Labour Co-op | Dawn Smith* | 1,061 | 22.9 | −22.9 |
| Conservative | Bryan Turner | 617 | 13.3 | −26.3 |
| Liberal Democrats | John Apsey | 252 | 5.4 | −0.6 |
| Majority | | 542 | 11.6 | N/A |
| Turnout | | 4,680 | 49.5 | |
| Registered electors | | 9,458 | | |
| Green gain from Labour Co-op | | | | |

Cissbury
| Party | Candidate | Votes | % | ±% |
|---|---|---|---|---|
| Conservative | Elizabeth Sparkes* | 1,577 | 32.7 | −32.1 |
| Reform | Jeremy Carter | 1,527 | 31.7 | N/A |
| Labour | Liz Nicholson | 790 | 16.4 | +1.0 |
| Green | Stephen Rhodes | 557 | 11.6 | +1.9 |
| Liberal Democrats | Iona Harte | 369 | 7.7 | −1.3 |
| Majority | | 50 | 1.0 | –48.4 |
| Turnout | | 4,830 | 55.1 | |
| Registered electors | | 8,766 | | |
| Conservative hold | | | | |

Durrington and Salvington
| Party | Candidate | Votes | % | ±% |
|---|---|---|---|---|
| Reform | Charles James | 1,680 | 38.3 | N/A |
| Conservative | Michael Cloake | 979 | 22.3 | −33.9 |
| Labour | Nikki Joule | 668 | 15.2 | −5.8 |
| Green | Luke Angel | 614 | 14.0 | +5.7 |
| Liberal Democrats | Emma Norton | 447 | 10.2 | −4.3 |
| Majority | | 701 | 16.0 | N/A |
| Turnout | | 4,404 | 45.4 | |
| Registered electors | | 9,692 | | |
| Reform gain from Conservative | | | | |

Goring
| Party | Candidate | Votes | % | ±% |
|---|---|---|---|---|
| Green | Ian Davey | 1,718 | 34.5 | +21.5 |
| Reform | Karen Harman | 1,329 | 26.7 | N/A |
| Conservative | Kevin Jenkins | 1,283 | 25.7 | −31.7 |
| Labour | Jo Bayly | 426 | 8.6 | −14.5 |
| Liberal Democrats | Merlin Jones | 220 | 4.4 | −1.9 |
| Majority | | 389 | 7.8 | N/A |
| Turnout | | 4,991 | 55.8 | |
| Registered electors | | 8,946 | | |
| Green gain from Conservative | | | | |

Northbrook
| Party | Candidate | Votes | % | ±% |
|---|---|---|---|---|
| Reform | Rob Venn | 1,428 | 32.3 | N/A |
| Labour | Ibsha Choudhury | 983 | 22.2 | −8.4 |
| Conservative | Sean McDonald* | 821 | 18.6 | −31.1 |
| Green | Alice Pimley | 670 | 15.1 | +6.7 |
| Liberal Democrats | Nicholas Wiltshire | 522 | 11.8 | +0.5 |
| Majority | | 445 | 10.1 | N/A |
| Turnout | | 4,441 | 41.2 | |
| Registered electors | | 10,789 | | |
| Reform gain from Conservative | | | | |

Tarring
| Party | Candidate | Votes | % | ±% |
|---|---|---|---|---|
| Labour | Henna Chowdhury* | 1,266 | 25.1 | −6.2 |
| Reform | Catherine Davies | 1,223 | 24.3 | N/A |
| Liberal Democrats | Hazel Thorpe | 1,178 | 23.4 | −5.1 |
| Green | Cloe Grampa | 803 | 15.9 | +8.2 |
| Conservative | Keith Bickers | 570 | 11.3 | −19.2 |
| Majority | | 43 | 0.8 | ±0.0 |
| Turnout | | 5,056 | 51.2 | |
| Registered electors | | 9,873 | | |
| Labour hold | | | | |

Worthing East
| Party | Candidate | Votes | % | ±% |
|---|---|---|---|---|
| Green | Katie Thornton | 1,444 | 32.4 | +21.0 |
| Labour Co-op | Cathy Glynn-Davies | 1,242 | 27.8 | −20.8 |
| Reform | Steven Jackson | 1,047 | 23.5 | N/A |
| Conservative | John Salisbury | 504 | 11.3 | −22.3 |
| Liberal Democrats | David Kingston | 225 | 5.0 | −1.3 |
| Majority | | 202 | 4.6 | N/A |
| Turnout | | 4,490 | 48.5 | |
| Registered electors | | 9,258 | | |
| Green gain from Labour Co-op | | Swing | ▲20.9 | |

Worthing Pier
| Party | Candidate | Votes | % | ±% |
|---|---|---|---|---|
| Green | Natasha Davie | 1,536 | 35.4 | +19.3 |
| Labour Co-op | Sam Theodoridi | 1,001 | 23.7 | −15.5 |
| Reform | Luke William Houghton | 878 | 20.8 | N/A |
| Conservative | Josh Harris | 530 | 12.6 | −23.8 |
| Liberal Democrats | Christine Brown | 272 | 6.5 | −0.8 |
| Majority | | 535 | 11.7 | N/A |
| Turnout | | 4,273 | 44.2 | |
| Registered electors | | 9,661 | | |
| Green gain from Labour Co-op | | Swing | ▲17.4 | |

Worthing West
| Party | Candidate | Votes | % | ±% |
|---|---|---|---|---|
| Labour | Martin McCabe | 1,568 | 33.0 | −13.4 |
| Conservative | Thomas Taylor | 1,031 | 21.7 | −17.4 |
| Reform | Sophie Fatehnia | 991 | 20.8 | N/A |
| Green | Jamie MacMillan | 899 | 18.9 | +11.7 |
| Liberal Democrats | Robin Rogers | 266 | 5.6 | +1.3 |
| Majority | | 537 | 11.3 | +4.0 |
| Turnout | | 4,800 | 53.6 | |
| Registered electors | | 8,955 | | |
| Labour gain from Independent | | Swing | ▲2.0 | |

== See also ==
- West Sussex County Council elections
