= 1997 West Sussex County Council election =

1997 UK local government election

Elections to West Sussex County Council were held on 1 May 1997 alongside a parliamentary general election. The whole council was up for election, and the Conservative Party regained control of the council from the Liberal Democrats who had governed since 1993 as a minority administration. Turnout across the county ranged from 57.7% in Richmond to 78.6% in Lindfield.

== Election result ==
West Sussex County Council Election Result 1997
Party	Seats	Gains	Losses	Net gain/loss	Seats %	Votes %	Votes	+/−
Conservative	37				52.11	42.90	177,848	
Liberal Democrats	24				33.80	33.10	137,191	
Labour	9				12.68	21.49	89,099	
Independent	1				1.41	1.68	6,494	
Green	0	0	0	0	0.0	0.72	2,999	
Referendum	0	0	0	0	0.0	0.08	327	
Worth Area Party	0	0	0	0	0.0	0.03	110	

== Results by electoral division ==
=== Adur ===
Kingston Buci
Party	Candidate	Votes	%	±%
Liberal Democrats	Sydney Little	1,859	37.2	
Conservative	Paul Sims	1,639	32.9	
Labour Co-op	Nigel Sweet	1,491	29.9	
Majority		220		
Turnout			72.3	

Lancing
Party	Candidate	Votes	%	±%
Liberal Democrats	Clifford Robinson	2,866	46.2	
Conservative	Simon Craghill	2,070	33.3	
Labour	James Largue	1,271	20.5	
Majority		794		
Turnout			74.2	

Saltings
Party	Candidate	Votes	%	±%
Conservative	Graham Jones	2,562	45.2	
Liberal Democrats	Jemima Robinson	2,372	41.9	
Labour Co-op	Richard Knight	733	12.9	
Majority		190		
Turnout			69.9	

Shoreham
Party	Candidate	Votes	%	±%
Conservative	Ian Elliott	3,109	46.6	
Liberal Democrats	Anthony Burtenshaw	2,094	31.4	
Labour Co-op	Geoffrey Howitt	1,463	21.9	
Majority		1,015		
Turnout			76.6	

Sompting
Party	Candidate	Votes	%	±%
Liberal Democrats	Malcolm Brookes	1,992	41.4	
Conservative	Mark M^{c}Carthy	1,492	31.4	
Labour	Edward Luxford	1,331	21.9	
Majority		500		
Turnout			71.6	

Southwick
Party	Candidate	Votes	%	±%
Labour Co-op	Brian Whipp	1,856	35.8	
Conservative	Robert Dunn	1,827	35.3	
Liberal Democrats	Derek Deedman	1,497	28.9	
Majority		29		
Turnout			74.5	

=== Arun ===
Arun East
Party	Candidate	Votes	%	±%
Conservative	Christopher Sedgwick	3,165	63.6	
Liberal Democrats	John Hughes	1,326	26.7	
Labour	Frank Levy	482	9.7	
Majority		1,839		
Turnout			78.1	

Arundel and Angmering
Party	Candidate	Votes	%	±%
Conservative	Margaret Winn	3,149	51.8	
Liberal Democrats	John Barstow	1,707	28.1	
Labour	David Jones	1,221	20.1	
Majority		1,442		
Turnout			74.3	

Bersted
Party	Candidate	Votes	%	±%
Liberal Democrats	Sylvia Olliver	2,577	38.5	
Conservative	Gary Boucher	2,171	32.4	
Labour	Jan Cosgrove	1,948	29.1	
Majority		406		
Turnout			67.5	

Bognor Regis
Party	Candidate	Votes	%	±%
Conservative	Robin Brown	2,768	44.6	
Liberal Democrats	Kenneth Scutt	2,444	39.4	
Labour	Gail Walker	995	16.0	
Majority		324		
Turnout			67.8	

Felpham
Party	Candidate	Votes	%	±%
Independent	Dominica Smith	3,035	54.6	
Liberal Democrats	Walter Vanner	1,621	29.2	
Labour	Alison M^{c}Isacc	899	16.2	
Majority		1,432		
Turnout			70.5	

Fontwell
Party	Candidate	Votes	%	±%
Conservative	Harold Hall	3,199	56.4	
Liberal Democrats	Simon M^{c}Dougall	1,896	33.4	
Labour	Thomas Oxtoby	576	10.2	
Majority		1,297		
Turnout			72.3	

Hotham
Party	Candidate	Votes	%	±%
Liberal Democrats	Catherine Morrish	1,975	39.7	
Conservative	Luke Parker	1,610	32.4	
Labour	Derek Fane	1,388	27.9	
Majority		365		
Turnout			63.3	

Littlehampton North
Party	Candidate	Votes	%	±%
Labour	George O'Neill	2,113	44.9	
Conservative	John Forster	1,508	32.0	
Liberal Democrats	David Jones	1,087	23.1	
Majority		606		
Turnout			63.7	

Littlehampton Town
Party	Candidate	Votes	%	±%
Conservative	Elizabeth Newell	2,022	34.0	
Liberal Democrats	Barbara Roberts	1,730	29.1	
Labour	David Dyball	1,711	28.7	
Independent	Andrew Hawkes	492	8.3	
Majority		292		
Turnout			63.7	

Middleton
Party	Candidate	Votes	%	±%
Conservative	John Betteridge	2,566	45.5	
Liberal Democrats	John Matthews	1,989	35.3	
Labour	Peter Found	884	15.7	
Independent	Marjorie Widdowson	202	3.6	
Majority		577		
Turnout			71.9	

Nyetimber
Party	Candidate	Votes	%	±%
Conservative	Christopher Gillings	3,409	49.7	
Liberal Democrats	Francis Oppler	1,914	27.9	
Labour	Michael Jones	1,531	22.3	
Majority		1,576		
Turnout			73.6	

Preston Manor
Party	Candidate	Votes	%	±%
Conservative	Peter Moor	3,610	54.7	
Liberal Democrats	John Richards	2,070	31.4	
Labour	Peter Nightingale	914	13.9	
Majority		1,540		
Turnout			73.6	

Rustington West
Party	Candidate	Votes	%	±%
Liberal Democrats	James Walsh	2,802	45.2	
Conservative	Phillipa Bower	2,563	41.3	
Labour	John Singleton	835	13.9	
Majority		239		
Turnout			73.6	

=== Chichester ===
Bourne
Party	Candidate	Votes	%	±%
Conservative	Thomas Dunn	2,503	40.5	
Liberal Democrats	Roy Ford	1,894	30.6	
Independent	Stanley Bray	986	15.9	
Labour	Roger Humphrey	801	13.0	
Majority		609		
Turnout			73.6	

Chichester East
Party	Candidate	Votes	%	±%
Liberal Democrats	Colin Tupper	2,246	45.7	
Conservative	Jane Chevs	1,742	35.5	
Labour	Timothy Weeks	925	18.8	
Majority		506		
Turnout			68.5	

Chichester North
Party	Candidate	Votes	%	±%
Conservative	Alan Phillips	2,386	45.5	
Liberal Democrats	Edith Pingree	2,232	42.6	
Labour	James Moran	625	11.9	
Majority		56		
Turnout			76.2	

Chichester South
Party	Candidate	Votes	%	±%
Liberal Democrats	John Rankin	2,589	44.1	
Conservative	Mary-Louise Bassett	2,338	39.8	
Labour	Geoffrey Jones	943	16.1	
Majority		251		
Turnout			73.0	

Chichester West
Party	Candidate	Votes	%	±%
Conservative	Kathryn Ward	2,947	46.2	
Liberal Democrats	Jennifer Wright	2,500	39.2	
Labour	Ian Edwards	926	14.5	
Majority		447		
Turnout			76.3	

Fernhurst
Party	Candidate	Votes	%	±%
Conservative	Terence Pemberton	3,034	50.5	
Liberal Democrats	Helena Lang	2,395	39.9	
Labour	David Morrison	576	9.6	
Majority		639		
Turnout			72.3	

Midhurst
Party	Candidate	Votes	%	±%
Conservative	Colin Walker	3,753	55.9	
Liberal Democrats	Robert Devreux	2,090	31.1	
Labour	Bernard Hollowood	874	13.0	
Majority		1,763		
Turnout			74.3	

Petworth
Party	Candidate	Votes	%	±%
Conservative	Sarah Greenwell	3,755	56.4	
Independent	Brian Hooton	1,779	26.7	
Labour	Andrew Young	1,128	16.9	
Majority		1,976		
Turnout			76.8	

Selsey and Sidlesham
Party	Candidate	Votes	%	±%
Conservative	Peter Jones	2,796	48.9	
Labour	Terrence Prince	1,394	24.4	
Liberal Democrats	Michael Shone	1,331	23.3	
Green	Eric Paine	191	3.3	
Majority		1,402		
Turnout			69.9	

The Witterings
Party	Candidate	Votes	%	±%
Conservative	John Daws-Chew	3,521	54.2	
Liberal Democrats	Simon Green	2,150	33.1	
Labour	John Feeney	830	12.8	
Majority		1,369		
Turnout			72.2	

=== Crawley ===
Bewbush
Party	Candidate	Votes	%	±%
Labour	Janet Scully	3,771	70.6	
Conservative	Lee Burke	1,569	29.4	
Majority		2,202		
Turnout			66.9	

Broadfield
Party	Candidate	Votes	%	±%
Labour	Michael Briggs	3,012	59.1	
Conservative	David Bowen	1,458	28.6	
Liberal Democrats	Linda Hamilton	627	12.3	
Majority		1,552		
Turnout			64.0	

Furnace Green
Party	Candidate	Votes	%	±%
Conservative	Henry Smith	3,839	44.8	
Labour	Anne Todd	3,521	41.1	
Liberal Democrats	Darren Wise	1,209	14.1	
Majority		318		
Turnout			71.9	

Gossops Green
Party	Candidate	Votes	%	±%
Labour	Anthony Edwards	2,628	51.8	
Conservative	Geoffrey Clarke	1,749	34.5	
Liberal Democrats	Josephine Hart	696	13.7	
Majority		879		
Turnout			71.9	

Ifield
Party	Candidate	Votes	%	±%
Labour	John Mortimer	2,532	59.4	
Conservative	Corrine Bowen	1,181	27.7	
Liberal Democrats	Howard Llewelyn	548	12.9	
Majority		1,351		
Turnout			71.2	

Langley Green
Party	Candidate	Votes	%	±%
Labour	James Smith	3,292	68.2	
Conservative	Stephen Wilkinson	1,140	23.6	
Liberal Democrats	Vipin Patel	392	8.1	
Majority		2,152		
Turnout			71.9	

Northgate Three Bridges
Party	Candidate	Votes	%	±%
Labour	William Buck	2,854	50.9	
Conservative	Colin Coyston	1,585	28.2	
Liberal Democrats	Barry Hamilton	1,172	20.9	
Majority		1,269		
Turnout			74.5	

Pound Hill
Party	Candidate	Votes	%	±%
Conservative	David Dewdney	2,804	48.9	
Labour	Raymond Calcot	1,954	34.1	
Liberal Democrats	Martin Hart	866	15.1	
Worth Area Party	Peter Temple-Smithson	110	1.9	
Majority		850		
Turnout			75.0	

Tilgate
Party	Candidate	Votes	%	±%
Labour	Douglas Mayne	3,342	61.9	
Conservative	David Withall	1,372	25.4	
Liberal Democrats	Richard Miller	686	12.7	
Majority		1,970		
Turnout			73.6	

=== Horsham ===
Billingshurst
Party	Candidate	Votes	%	±%
Conservative	Tara Podger	2,116	44.1	
Liberal Democrats	Geoffrey Lawes	1,706	35.5	
Labour	Philip Gander	650	13.5	
Referendum	Robert Lomas	327	6.8	
Majority		410		
Turnout			72.0	

Henfield
Party	Candidate	Votes	%	±%
Conservative	William Cantello	3,587	58.3	
Liberal Democrats	Marcus Heawood	1,607	26.1	
Labour	Susan Erlam	961	15.6	
Majority		1,970		
Turnout			74.9	

Holbrook
Party	Candidate	Votes	%	±%
Conservative	Neil Matthewson	4,207	51.9	
Liberal Democrats	Derek Brundish	2,639	32.6	
Labour	Raymond Chapman	1,254	15.5	
Majority		1,568		
Turnout			73.7	

Hurst
Party	Candidate	Votes	%	±%
Liberal Democrats	Nigel Dennis	2,207	45.9	
Conservative	Peter Tobutt	2,043	42.5	
Labour	Joan Thurston	559	15.6	
Majority		164		
Turnout			71.1	

Pulborough
Party	Candidate	Votes	%	±%
Conservative	Carmel Cain	5,093	74.0	
Labour	Christine Rees	1,788	26.0	
Majority		3,305		
Turnout			73.3	

Riverside
Party	Candidate	Votes	%	±%
Liberal Democrats	Morwen Millson	2,790	46.6	
Conservative	Barbara Palmer	2,405	40.2	
Labour	George Burton	788	13.2	
Majority		385		
Turnout			72.6	

Roffey
Party	Candidate	Votes	%	±%
Liberal Democrats	Jacobus Clausen	2,606	40.8	
Conservative	Brian Watson	2,603	40.7	
Labour	Roger Brown	1,179	18.5	
Majority		3		
Turnout			74.0	

Southwater
Party	Candidate	Votes	%	±%
Liberal Democrats	Mary Beeson	3,303	44.6	
Conservative	Trevor Boud	3,135	42.3	
Labour	Diane Dumbrill	968	13.1	
Majority		168		
Turnout			73.8	

Steyning
Party	Candidate	Votes	%	±%
Liberal Democrats	John Campbell	2,956	47.3	
Conservative	Anthony Dennis	2,649	42.4	
Labour	Julia Bridgewater	639	10.2	
Majority		307		
Turnout			74.2	

Storrington
Party	Candidate	Votes	%	±%
Conservative	Frank Wilkinson	2,781	51.3	
Liberal Democrats	Kenneth Bates	2,042	37.7	
Labour	David Wickham	594	11.0	
Majority		739		
Turnout			72.8	

Warnham
Party	Candidate	Votes	%	±%
Conservative	Norman Horton	2,666	50.9	
Liberal Democrats	David Wright	1,990	38.0	
Labour	Eric Brady	583	11.1	
Majority		676		
Turnout			74.6	

=== Mid Sussex ===
Burgess Hill Central
Party	Candidate	Votes	%	±%
Liberal Democrats	Angela Chapman	3,258	45.8	
Conservative	Peter Burgess	2,532	35.6	
Labour	Paul Mitchell	1,170	16.4	
Green	Hugh Stevens	155	2.2	
Majority		906		
Turnout			76.9	

Burgess Hill East
Party	Candidate	Votes	%	±%
Liberal Democrats	Heather Ross	2,903	51.3	
Conservative	Michael Greenhow	1,964	34.7	
Labour	Lesley Whiting	664	11.7	
Green	Ruth Stevens	128	2.3	
Majority		939		
Turnout			77.2	

Cuckfield Rural
Party	Candidate	Votes	%	±%
Conservative	Michael Dennis	3,066	51.8	
Liberal Democrats	Jack Slaughter	1,763	29.8	
Labour	Frederick Harrison	774	13.1	
Green	Josephine Came	317	5.4	
Majority		1,303		
Turnout			78.0	

East Grinstead East
Party	Candidate	Votes	%	±%
Liberal Democrats	Margaret Collins	2,645	45.6	
Conservative	Margaret Ball	2,239	38.6	
Labour	Margaret Scott	692	11.9	
Green	Adrian Salmon	226	3.9	
Majority		407		
Turnout			76.9	

East Grinstead South
Party	Candidate	Votes	%	±%
Liberal Democrats	Andrew Brock	2,470	44.1	
Conservative	Allan Beal	2,429	43.3	
Labour	David Dickson	705	12.6	
Majority		41		
Turnout			76.7	

Hassocks and Burgess Hill West
Party	Candidate	Votes	%	±%
Liberal Democrats	Tony Balsdon	3,238	46.2	
Conservative	David Terry	2,494	35.6	
Labour	Patricia Ashcroft	1,102	15.7	
Green	Carol Filby	169	2.4	
Majority		744		
Turnout			77.3	

Haywards Heath East
Party	Candidate	Votes	%	±%
Conservative	Joan Gayler	1,947	35.1	
Labour	Mervyn Hamilton	1,743	31.4	
Liberal Democrats	Julia Brown	1,735	31.3	
Green	Edward Hasley	125	2.3	
Majority		204		
Turnout			78.2	

Haywards Heath West
Party	Candidate	Votes	%	±%
Liberal Democrats	Brian Hall	2,557	46.6	
Conservative	John Wilson	1,937	35.3	
Labour	Paddy Henry	835	15.2	
Green	Simon Anderson	156	2.8	
Majority		620		
Turnout			77.5	

Imberdown
Party	Candidate	Votes	%	±%
Conservative	Phillip Coote	3,573	46.3	
Liberal Democrats	Dorothy Hatswell	2,747	35.6	
Labour	Roger Burgess	1,179	15.3	
Green	Stephanie Gibson	223	2.9	
Majority		826		
Turnout			76.6	

Lindfield
Party	Candidate	Votes	%	±%
Conservative	Margaret Johnson	2,789	48.2	
Liberal Democrats	Anne-Marie Lucraft	2,019	34.9	
Labour	Nicholas Lightbody	761	13.2	
Green	Peter Weymss-Gorman	215	3.7	
Majority		770		
Turnout			78.6	

Mid Sussex North
Party	Candidate	Votes	%	±%
Conservative	William Acraman	3,288	53.2	
Liberal Democrats	Nicholas Dennis	1,379	22.3	
Labour	Joe Mitchell	1,291	20.9	
Green	Maurice Weeler	223	3.6	
Majority		1,909		
Turnout			74.2	

Mid Sussex South
Party	Candidate	Votes	%	±%
Conservative	Barrington Mack	3,112	56.0	
Liberal Democrats	Anthony Davies	1,477	26.6	
Labour	Maureen Ryan	795	14.3	
Green	Nadia Seefreid	176	3.2	
Majority		1,635		
Turnout			78.1	

=== Worthing ===
Broadwater
Party	Candidate	Votes	%	±%
Liberal Democrats	Amanda Claire	2,362	46.3	
Conservative	Celia Bettelley	1,769	34.7	
Labour	Michael Wooley	974	19.1	
Majority		1,592		
Turnout		5,105	69.9	

Cissbury
Party	Candidate	Votes	%	±%
Conservative	Collingwood O'Neill	3,241	51.8	
Liberal Democrats	George Miller	2,441	39.0	
Labour	Teana Ashley	577	9.2	
Majority		800		
Turnout			74.0	

Durrington
Party	Candidate	Votes	%	±%
Liberal Democrats	Nicholas Rodgers	2,400	44.0	
Conservative	Patricia Farrel	2,326	42.6	
Labour	Karen Hammond	734	13.4	
Majority		74		
Turnout			71.1	

East Worthing
Party	Candidate	Votes	%	±%
Liberal Democrats	Irene Richards	2,009	41.0	
Conservative	Tony Jackson	1,737	35.4	
Labour	Colin Marshall	996	20.3	
Green	Joan Glass	161	3.3	
Majority		272		
Turnout			62.7	

Goring-by-Sea
Party	Candidate	Votes	%	±%
Conservative	Graham Forshaw	3,351	54.2	
Liberal Democrats	Stewart M^{c}Gurn-Stewart	2,134	34.5	
Labour	Olive Rand	696	11.3	
Majority		2,217		
Turnout			71.9	

Maybridge
Party	Candidate	Votes	%	±%
Liberal Democrats	Peter Green	2,300	45.7	
Conservative	Paul Bleasdale	1,769	35.2	
Labour	Peter Balderstone	961	19.1	
Majority		531		
Turnout			72.0	

Richmond
Party	Candidate	Votes	%	±%
Conservative	John Livermore	1,654	41.2	
Liberal Democrats	Cyril Selby	1,519	37.8	
Labour	John Hammond	665	16.6	
Green	Derek Colkett	179	4.5	
Majority		135		
Turnout			57.7	

Salvington
Party	Candidate	Votes	%	±%
Conservative	Clement Stevens	2,601	46.1	
Liberal Democrats	Dennis Rowley	2,327	41.3	
Labour	Jean Wicks	713	12.6	
Majority		229		
Turnout			72.3	

West Parade
Party	Candidate	Votes	%	±%
Conservative	Esther Giddins	3,177	53.6	
Liberal Democrats	Helen Brown	1,789	30.2	
Labour	Julie Balderstone	780	13.2	
Green	Lucielle Cokett	185	3.1	
Majority		1,388		
Turnout			69.5	

West Tarring
Party	Candidate	Votes	%	±%
Liberal Democrats	John Rose	2,432	48.5	
Conservative	Henry Kemp	1,657	33.0	
Labour	John Parr	759	15.1	
Green	Stuart Colgate	170	3.4	
Majority		585		
Turnout			66.8	
