= 2001 West Sussex County Council election =

2001 UK local government election

Elections to West Sussex County Council were held on 7 June 2001, alongside a parliamentary general election. The whole council was up for election, and the Conservative Party remained in control of the council. Turnout across the county ranged from 42.7% in Broadfield to 69.6% in Midhurst, with the county average standing at 60.8%.

== Election result ==
West Sussex County Council Election Result 2001
Party	Seats	Gains	Losses	Net gain/loss	Seats %	Votes %	Votes	+/−
Conservative	42	6	2	+4	59.2	43.8	155,338	
Liberal Democrats	18	2	7	-5	25.4	32.1	113,902	
Labour	11	2	0	+2	15.5	22.4	79,370	
Green	0	0	0	0	0.0	0.7	2,527	
Independent	0	0	1	-1	0.0	0.6	2,155	
UKIP	0	0	0	0	0.0	0.2	876	
Socialist Labour	0	0	0	0	0.0	0.1	232	
Monster Raving Loony	0	0	0	0	0.0	0.0	113	

== Results by electoral division ==
=== Adur ===
Kingston Buci
Party	Candidate	Votes	%	±%
Conservative	David Ashley	1,554	36.4	
Labour Co-op	David Munnery	1,379	32.4	
Liberal Democrats	Sydney Little	1,328	31.2	
Majority		175	4.0	
Turnout		4,261	60.3	
Conservative gain from Liberal Democrats		Swing		

Lancing
Party	Candidate	Votes	%	±%
Conservative	Anthony Nicklen	1,834	37.5	
Liberal Democrats	Keith Dollemore	1,774	36.3	
Labour	David Rubin	1,284	26.2	
Majority		60	1.2	
Turnout		4,892	58.7	
Conservative gain from Liberal Democrats		Swing		

Saltings
Party	Candidate	Votes	%	±%
Conservative	Peter Mockridge	2,533	46.7	
Labour Co-op	Jeanette White	1,585	29.2	
Liberal Democrats	Patrick Beresford	1,302	24.0	
Majority		948	17.8	
Turnout		5,420	60.2	
Conservative hold		Swing		

Shoreham
Party	Candidate	Votes	%	±%
Conservative	Clive Williams	2,526	44.9	
Labour Co-op	Geoffrey Howitt	1,916	34.0	
Liberal Democrats	Elisa Vaughan	1,186	21.1	
Majority		610	10.9	
Turnout		5,628	65.4	
Conservative hold		Swing		

Sompting
Party	Candidate	Votes	%	±%
Conservative	Vilna Woolhead	1,430	36.1	
Labour	Peter Berry	1,298	32.8	
Liberal Democrats	Malcolm Brookes	1,235	31.1	
Majority		132	3.3	
Turnout		3,963	59.5	
Conservative gain from Liberal Democrats		Swing		

Southwick
Party	Candidate	Votes	%	±%
Labour Co-op	Brian Whipp	1,738	41.4	
Conservative	Robert Dunn	1,580	37.7	
Liberal Democrats	John Hilditch	876	20.9	
Majority		158	3.7	
Turnout		4,194	61.2	
Labour Co-op hold		Swing		

=== Arun ===
Arun East
Party	Candidate	Votes	%	±%
Conservative	Christopher Sedgwick	2,880	66.3	
Liberal Democrats	Margaret Munro	1,442	33.4	
Majority		1,438	33.2	
Turnout		4,322	67.9	
Conservative hold		Swing		

Arundel and Angmering
Party	Candidate	Votes	%	±%
Conservative	Oliver Wingrove	2,598	51.8	
Liberal Democrats	Ivan Olney	2,418	48.2	
Majority		180	3.6	
Turnout		5,016	61.2	
Conservative hold		Swing		

Bersted
Party	Candidate	Votes	%	±%
Labour	Simon Holland	1,928	36.8	
Conservative	Bernard Widger	1,840	35.1	
Liberal Democrats	Simon M^{c}Dougall	1,470	28.1	
Majority		88	1.7	
Turnout		5,238	53.9	
Labour gain from Liberal Democrats		Swing		

Bognor Regis
Party	Candidate	Votes	%	±%
Conservative	Robin Brown	2,416	46.7	
Liberal Democrats	Kenneth Scutt	1,723	33.3	
Labour	Gail Walker	1,029	19.9	
Majority		693	13.4	
Turnout		5,168	58.4	
Conservative hold		Swing		

Felpham
Party	Candidate	Votes	%	±%
Conservative	Alan-Jeffrey Stainton	2,035	40.2	
Independent	George Stride	1,383	27.3	
Labour	Melanie Webb	843	16.7	
Liberal Democrats	John Barstow	799	15.8	
Majority		652	12.9	
Turnout		5,060	64.2	
Conservative gain from Independent		Swing		

Fontwell
Party	Candidate	Votes	%	±%
Conservative	Harold Hall	2,792	53.0	
Liberal Democrats	Stephen White	1,346	25.5	
Labour	Andrew Holliday	1,133	21.5	
Majority		1,446	27.5	
Turnout		5,271	62.2	
Conservative hold		Swing		

Hotham
Party	Candidate	Votes	%	±%
Labour	Michael Jones	1,393	36.6	
Conservative	Hilary Flynn	1,246	32.7	
Liberal Democrats	Catherine Morrish	1,166	30.6	
Majority		147	3.9	
Turnout		3,805	50.4	
Labour gain from Liberal Democrats		Swing		

Littlehampton North
Party	Candidate	Votes	%	±%
Labour	George O'Neill	1,838	48.3	
Conservative	Marian Ayres	1,286	33.8	
Liberal Democrats	David Jones	678	17.8	
Majority		552	14.5	
Turnout		3,802	54.1	
Labour hold		Swing		

Littlehampton Town
Party	Candidate	Votes	%	±%
Conservative	Graham Tyler	1,838	35.6	
Labour	Alan Butcher	1,717	33.3	
Liberal Democrats	Nicholas Wiltshire	1,359	26.3	
Independent	Scott Horwood	244	4.7	
Majority		121	2.3	
Turnout		5,158	53.1	
Conservative hold		Swing		

Middleton
Party	Candidate	Votes	%	±%
Conservative	Christina Freeman	2,494	51.2	
Liberal Democrats	Roslyn Kissell	1,266	26.0	
Labour	Tiggy Ayoub	1,107	22.7	
Majority		1,228	25.2	
Turnout		4,867	60.0	
Conservative hold		Swing		

Nyetimber
Party	Candidate	Votes	%	±%
Conservative	Michael Coleman	2,980	47.9	
Liberal Democrats	Francis Oppler	1,557	25.0	
Labour	Pauline Nash	1,397	22.5	
Independent	Peter Cain	285	4.9	
Majority		1,423	22.9	
Turnout		6,219	63.3	
Conservative hold		Swing		

Preston Manor
Party	Candidate	Votes	%	±%
Conservative	Peter Moor	3,321	58.9	
Liberal Democrats	John Richards	2,315	41.1	
Majority		1,006	17.8	
Turnout		5,636	62.8	
Conservative hold		Swing		

Rustington West
Party	Candidate	Votes	%	±%
Liberal Democrats	James Walsh	2,332	41.1	
Conservative	David Marchant	2,280	40.2	
Labour	Edward Walsh	1,056	18.6	
Majority		52	0.9	
Turnout		5,668	64.6	
Liberal Democrats hold		Swing		

=== Chichester ===
Bourne
Party	Candidate	Votes	%	±%
Conservative	Thomas Dunn	2,501	46.1	
Liberal Democrats	Karen Juniper	1,248	23.0	
Labour	Oona Hickson	1,064	19.6	
Green	Judith Barr	250	4.6	
UKIP	Alicia Denny	203	3.7	
Independent	Mark Hoar	163	3.0	
Majority		1,253	23.1	
Turnout		5,429	62.3	
Conservative hold		Swing		

Chichester East
Party	Candidate	Votes	%	±%
Liberal Democrats	Michael Hall	1,661	40.9	
Conservative	John Roffey	1,145	28.2	
Labour	Benjamin Earnshaw-Mansell	900	22.2	
Green	Carolyn Finbow	179	4.4	
UKIP	Elizabeth Bygrave	177	4.4	
Majority		516	12.7	
Turnout		4,062	57.4	
Liberal Democrats hold		Swing		

Chichester North
Party	Candidate	Votes	%	±%
Conservative	Alan Phillips	2,203	46.1	
Liberal Democrats	Barry Fletcher	1,800	37.6	
Labour	Selma Barkham	580	12.1	
Green	Valerie Briginshaw	199	4.2	
Majority		403	8.5	
Turnout		4,782	66.5	
Conservative hold		Swing		

Chichester South
Party	Candidate	Votes	%	±%
Conservative	Anthony Dignum	1,803	35.2	
Liberal Democrats	Alan Chaplin	1,798	35.1	
Labour	John Bennett	1,073	21.0	
Green	Josephine Eckhard	223	4.4	
UKIP	Nigel Muir	223	4.4	
Majority		5	0.1	
Turnout		5,120	62.6	
Conservative gain from Liberal Democrats		Swing		

Chichester West
Party	Candidate	Votes	%	±%
Conservative	Mary-Louise Goldsmith	2,158	39.7	
Liberal Democrats	David Siggs	1,904	35.0	
Labour	Ian Edwards	861	15.8	
UKIP	Douglas Denny	273	5.0	
Green	Gavin Graham	246	4.5	
Majority		254	4.7	
Turnout		5,442	65.1	
Conservative hold		Swing		

Fernhurst
Party	Candidate	Votes	%	±%
Conservative	Terence Pemberton	2,960	56.0	
Liberal Democrats	William Quinn	1,576	29.8	
Labour	Bernard Hollowood	750	14.2	
Majority		1,384	26.2	
Turnout		5,286	66.0	
Conservative hold		Swing		

Midhurst
Party	Candidate	Votes	%	±%
Conservative	Colin Walker	2,957	49.3	
Liberal Democrats	Andrew Shaxson	2,358	39.3	
Labour	Andrew Young	683	11.4	
Majority		599	10.0	
Turnout		5,998	69.6	
Conservative hold		Swing		

Petworth
Party	Candidate	Votes	%	±%
Conservative	Sarah Greenwell	3,447	58.6	
Liberal Democrats	John Ireland	1,716	29.2	
Labour	Dave Morrison	723	12.3	
Majority		1,731	29.4	
Turnout		5,886	65.7	
Conservative hold		Swing		

Selsey and Sidlesham
Party	Candidate	Votes	%	±%
Conservative	Peter Jones	2,639	47.4	
Labour	Ian Bell	1,858	33.4	
Liberal Democrats	Leonard Eyles	1,070	19.2	
Majority		781	14.0	
Turnout		5,567	62.3	
Conservative hold		Swing		

The Witterings
Party	Candidate	Votes	%	±%
Conservative	John Daws-Chew	3,283	54.8	
Liberal Democrats	Roger Tilbury	1,477	24.7	
Labour	Patrick O'Sullivan	1,229	20.5	
Majority		1,806	30.1	
Turnout		5,989	63.2	
Conservative hold		Swing		

=== Crawley ===
Bewbush
Party	Candidate	Votes	%	±%
Labour	Janet Scully	2,282	60.2	
Conservative	Matthew Cowdrey	950	25.1	
Liberal Democrats	Barry Hamilton	557	14.7	
Majority		1,332	35.1	
Turnout		3,789	45.8	
Labour hold		Swing		

Broadfield
Party	Candidate	Votes	%	±%
Labour	Michael Briggs	2,010	55.2	
Conservative	David Bowen	1,016	27.9	
Liberal Democrats	Howard Llewelyn	477	13.1	
Socialist Labour	Martyn Badger	136	3.7	
Majority		994	27.3	
Turnout		3,639	42.7	
Labour hold		Swing		

Furnace Green
Party	Candidate	Votes	%	±%
Conservative	Henry Smith	3,484	44.8	
Labour	Ian Irvine	2,951	38.0	
Liberal Democrats	Victoria Jones	1,337	17.2	
Majority		533	6.8	
Turnout		7,772	58.8	
Conservative hold		Swing		

Gossops Green
Party	Candidate	Votes	%	±%
Labour	Christopher Mullins	2,040	51.3	
Conservative	Geoffrey Clarke	1,347	33.9	
Liberal Democrats	Darren Wise	592	14.9	
Majority		693	17.4	
Turnout		3,979	55.5	
Labour hold		Swing		

Ifield
Party	Candidate	Votes	%	±%
Labour	John Mortimer	1,888	55.9	
Conservative	Christina Belben	940	27.8	
Liberal Democrats	Edward Reay	549	16.3	
Majority		948	28.1	
Turnout		3,377	55.0	
Labour hold		Swing		

Langley Green
Party	Candidate	Votes	%	±%
Labour	James Smith	2,483	65.0	
Conservative	Lee Burke	812	21.2	
Liberal Democrats	Kevin Osborne	527	13.8	
Majority		1,671	43.8	
Turnout		3,822	73.6	
Labour hold		Swing		

Northgate Three Bridges
Party	Candidate	Votes	%	±%
Labour	William Buck	2,200	49.4	
Conservative	Margaret Flatt	1,290	29.0	
Liberal Democrats	Gordon Robson	964	21.6	
Majority		910	20.4	
Turnout		4,454	58.0	
Labour hold		Swing		

Pound Hill
Party	Candidate	Votes	%	±%
Conservative	David Dewdney	2,273	48.5	
Labour	David Shreeves	1,517	32.4	
Liberal Democrats	Nigel Aldridge	813	17.4	
Independent	Richard Symonds	80	1.7	
Majority		756	16.1	
Turnout		4,683	53.4	
Conservative hold		Swing		

Tilgate
Party	Candidate	Votes	%	±%
Labour	Colin Lloyd	2,266	56.1	
Conservative	Corinne Bowen	1,086	26.9	
Liberal Democrats	Roger M^{c}Murry	591	14.6	
Socialist Labour	Derek Isaacs	96	2.4	
Majority		1,180	29.2	
Turnout		4,039	54.6	
Labour hold		Swing		

=== Horsham ===
Billingshurst
Party	Candidate	Votes	%	±%
Conservative	Owen Davies	1,985	44.0	
Liberal Democrats	Geoffrey Lawes	1,617	35.8	
Labour	Peter Scott	909	20.2	
Majority		368	8.2	
Turnout		4,511	62.9	
Conservative hold		Swing		

Henfield
Party	Candidate	Votes	%	±%
Conservative	Lionel Barnard	3,278	59.7	
Labour	Richard Hanford	1,193	21.7	
Liberal Democrats	Laurence Price	1,018	18.5	
Majority		2,085	38.0	
Turnout		5,489	63.6	
Conservative hold		Swing		

Holbrook
Party	Candidate	Votes	%	±%
Conservative	Geoffrey Wilson	3,768	51.9	
Liberal Democrats	David Sheldon	2,217	30.6	
Labour	Raymond Chapman	1,270	17.5	
Majority		1,551	21.3	
Turnout		7,255	69.2	
Conservative hold		Swing		

Hurst
Party	Candidate	Votes	%	±%
Liberal Democrats	Nigel Dennis	2,279	53.4	
Conservative	Christian Mitchell	1,518	35.6	
Labour	Philip Gander	470	11.0	
Majority		761	17.8	
Turnout		4,267	67.8	
Liberal Democrats hold		Swing		

Pulborough
Party	Candidate	Votes	%	±%
Conservative	Patricia Arculus	4,028	62.5	
Liberal Democrats	Sarah Barstow	1,467	22.8	
Labour	Edward Pitt	949	14.7	
Majority		2,561	39.7	
Turnout		6,444	67.4	
Conservative hold		Swing		

Riverside
Party	Candidate	Votes	%	±%
Liberal Democrats	Morwen Millson	2,611	50.6	
Conservative	Barbara Palmer	1,804	35.0	
Labour	Josephine Battersby	744	14.4	
Majority		807	15.6	
Turnout		5,159	61.3	
Liberal Democrats hold		Swing		

Roffey
Party	Candidate	Votes	%	±%
Liberal Democrats	Jacobus Clausen	2,495	46.8	
Conservative	Hasan Imam	2,041	38.3	
Labour	Mervyn Hamilton	796	14.9	
Majority		454	8.5	
Turnout		5,332	60.6	
Liberal Democrats hold		Swing		

Southwater
Party	Candidate	Votes	%	±%
Conservative	Brian Watson	2,983	43.5	
Liberal Democrats	Peter Stainton	2,926	42.6	
Labour	Diane Dumbrill	952	13.9	
Majority		57	0.9	
Turnout		6,861	62.8	
Conservative gain from Liberal Democrats		Swing		

Steyning
Party	Candidate	Votes	%	±%
Liberal Democrats	Derek Deedman	2,290	41.9	
Conservative	Michael Willett	2,284	41.8	
Labour	John Ridley	886	16.2	
Majority		6	0.1	
Turnout		5,460	64.1	
Liberal Democrats gain from Conservative		Swing		

Storrington
Party	Candidate	Votes	%	±%
Conservative	Frank Wilkinson	2,919	55.8	
Liberal Democrats	John Hewitt	1,374	26.3	
Labour	Phillipa Banks	934	17.9	
Majority		1,545	29.5	
Turnout		5,227	64.9	
Conservative hold		Swing		

Warnham
Party	Candidate	Votes	%	±%
Conservative	Michael Hodgson	2,488	53.3	
Liberal Democrats	Richard Aris	1,424	30.5	
Labour	Richard Corthine	753	16.1	
Majority		1,064	22.8	
Turnout		4,665	64.5	
Conservative hold		Swing		

=== Mid Sussex ===
Burgess Hill Central
Party	Candidate	Votes	%	±%
Liberal Democrats	Angela Chapman	2,998	49.8	
Conservative	Edward Holland	1,965	32.7	
Labour	Ann Bridges	1,029	17.1	
Majority		1,033	17.1	
Turnout		6,018	61.2	
Liberal Democrats hold		Swing		

Burgess Hill East
Party	Candidate	Votes	%	±%
Liberal Democrats	Tony Balsdon	2,355	49.4	
Conservative	Christopher Hersey	1,768	37.1	
Labour	Nigel Sweet	575	12.1	
Majority		587	12.3	
Turnout		4,769	64.8	
Liberal Democrats hold		Swing		

Cuckfield Rural
Party	Candidate	Votes	%	±%
Conservative	Michael Dennis	2,758	51.8	
Liberal Democrats	Diane Shevels	1,543	29.0	
Labour	Frederick Harrison	982	18.5	
Majority		1,215	22.8	
Turnout		5,322	68.4	
Conservative hold		Swing		

East Grinstead East
Party	Candidate	Votes	%	±%
Liberal Democrats	Margaret Collins	2,290	49.5	
Conservative	Roger Horman	1,813	39.2	
Labour	Duncan Irvine	478	10.3	
Majority		477	10.3	
Turnout		4,623	61.6	
Liberal Democrats hold		Swing		

East Grinstead South
Party	Candidate	Votes	%	±%
Liberal Democrats	Andrew Brock	2,321	46.3	
Conservative	Allan Beal	2,158	43.0	
Labour	Jeremey Tomlinson	499	9.9	
Majority		163	0.3	
Turnout		5,016	64.6	
Liberal Democrats hold		Swing		

Hassocks and Burgess Hill West
Party	Candidate	Votes	%	±%
Liberal Democrats	Colin Wilsdon	2,827	43.5	
Conservative	Andrew Barrett-Miles	2,621	40.3	
Labour	Arleene Piercy	1,014	15.6	
Majority		206	3.2	
Turnout		6,503	63.4	
Liberal Democrats hold		Swing		

Haywards Heath East
Party	Candidate	Votes	%	±%
Conservative	Joan Gayler	1,744	36.7	
Labour	Patrick Henry	1,675	35.3	
Liberal Democrats	Trevor Harman	1,302	27.5	
Majority		69	1.4	
Turnout		4,743	65.4	
Conservative hold		Swing		

Haywards Heath West
Party	Candidate	Votes	%	±%
Liberal Democrats	Brian Hall	2,075	42.3	
Conservative	Clive Chapman	1,896	38.7	
Labour	Rosemary Irvine	788	16.1	
Monster Raving Loony	Peter Berry	113	2.3	
Majority		179	3.7	
Turnout		4,901	67.3	
Liberal Democrats hold		Swing		

Imberdown
Party	Candidate	Votes	%	±%
Conservative	Phillip Coote	3,157	48.5	
Liberal Democrats	Janette Wilson	2,269	34.8	
Labour	John Crawford	1,035	15.9	
Majority		888	13.6	
Turnout		6,514	63.0	
Conservative hold		Swing		

Lindfield
Party	Candidate	Votes	%	±%
Conservative	Margaret Johnson	2,515	48.6	
Liberal Democrats	Anne-Marie Lucraft	1,943	37.5	
Labour	Pascal Atkins	684	13.2	
Majority		572	11.1	
Turnout		5,177	69.4	
Conservative hold		Swing		

Mid Sussex North
Party	Candidate	Votes	%	±%
Conservative	William Acraman	2,813	53.3	
Liberal Democrats	Philip Brown	1,437	27.2	
Labour	Thaddeus Dell	971	18.4	
Majority		1,376	26.1	
Turnout		5,282	63.1	
Conservative hold		Swing		

Mid Sussex South
Party	Candidate	Votes	%	±%
Conservative	John Oliver	2,525	53.9	
Liberal Democrats	Anthony Davies	1,359	29.0	
Labour	Dawn Houghton	747	16.0	
Majority		1,166	24.9	
Turnout		4,683	66.4	
Conservative hold		Swing		

=== Worthing ===
Broadwater
Party	Candidate	Votes	%	±%
Liberal Democrats	Donald Lissenburg	1,927	48.2	
Conservative	Simon Paskin	1,296	32.4	
Labour	Gillian Thompson	775	19.4	
Majority		631	15.8	
Turnout		3,998	54.3	
Liberal Democrats hold		Swing		

Cissbury
Party	Candidate	Votes	%	±%
Conservative	Collingwood O'Neill	2,906	54.4	
Liberal Democrats	Paul Daniels	1,679	31.4	
Labour	Ann Saunders	756	14.2	
Majority		1,227	23.0	
Turnout		5,341	63.1	
Conservative hold		Swing		

Durrington
Party	Candidate	Votes	%	±%
Liberal Democrats	Nicholas Rodgers	2,639	59.1	
Conservative	David Goodyer	1,549	34.7	
Green	Lilian Taylor	278	6.2	
Majority		1,090	24.4	
Turnout		4,466	54.2	
Liberal Democrats hold		Swing		

East Worthing
Party	Candidate	Votes	%	±%
Liberal Democrats	Irene Richards	1,563	37.6	
Conservative	Graham Fabes	1,395	33.5	
Labour	John Turley	965	23.2	
Green	Coral Pfluger	236	5.7	
Majority		168	4.1	
Turnout		4,159	52.7	
Liberal Democrats hold		Swing		

Goring-by-Sea
Party	Candidate	Votes	%	±%
Conservative	Steven Waight	2,917	56.2	
Liberal Democrats	Robert Smytherman	1,449	27.9	
Labour	Brian Gill	823	15.9	
Majority		1,468	28.3	
Turnout		5,189	65.4	
Conservative hold		Swing		

Maybridge
Party	Candidate	Votes	%	±%
Liberal Democrats	Robin Rogers	1,543	38.6	
Conservative	Andrew Garrett	1,513	37.8	
Labour	Antony Bignell	946	23.6	
Majority		30	0.8	
Turnout		4,002	56.4	
Liberal Democrats hold		Swing		

Richmond
Party	Candidate	Votes	%	±%
Liberal Democrats	Cecil Golds	1,278	39.1	
Conservative	Noël Atkins	1,236	37.8	
Labour	Richard Battson	581	17.8	
Green	Derek Colkett	174	5.3	
Majority		42	1.3	
Turnout		3,269	46.3	
Liberal Democrats gain from Conservative		Swing		

Salvington
Party	Candidate	Votes	%	±%
Conservative	Clement Stevens	2,147	46.1	
Liberal Democrats	Sheila Player	1,561	33.5	
Labour	Peter Barnes	713	15.3	
Green	Joan Glass	233	5.0	
Majority		586	12.6	
Turnout		4,654	59.4	
Conservative hold		Swing		

West Parade
Party	Candidate	Votes	%	±%
Conservative	John Livermore	2,530	50.4	
Liberal Democrats	James Doyle	1,343	26.7	
Labour	Barrie Slater	808	16.1	
Green	Lucielle Cokett	340	6.8	
Majority		1,187	23.7	
Turnout		5,021	58.6	
Conservative hold		Swing		

West Tarring
Party	Candidate	Votes	%	±%
Liberal Democrats	Peter Green	1,896	47.4	
Conservative	Arthur Andrews	1,263	31.6	
Labour	Ian Sandell	671	16.8	
Green	Marie Hillcoat	169	4.2	
Majority		633	15.8	
Turnout		3,999	58.6	
Liberal Democrats hold		Swing		
