= Agriculture in England =

Agriculture in England is today intensive, highly mechanised, and efficient by European standards, producing about 60% of food needs with only 2% of the labour force. It contributes around 2% of GDP. Around two thirds of production is devoted to livestock, one third to arable crops. Agriculture is heavily subsidised by the European Union's Common Agricultural Policy.

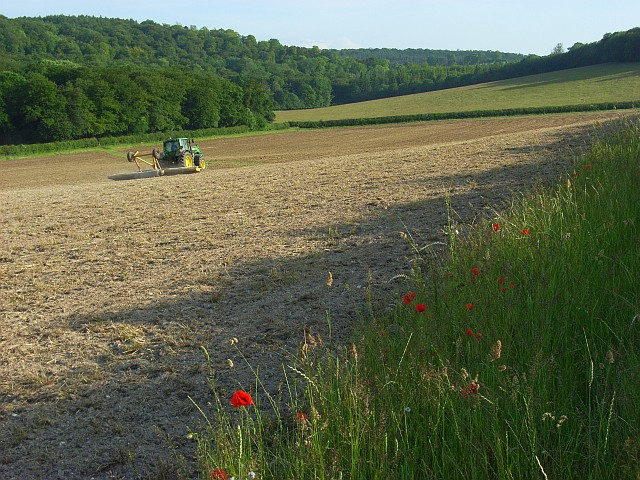
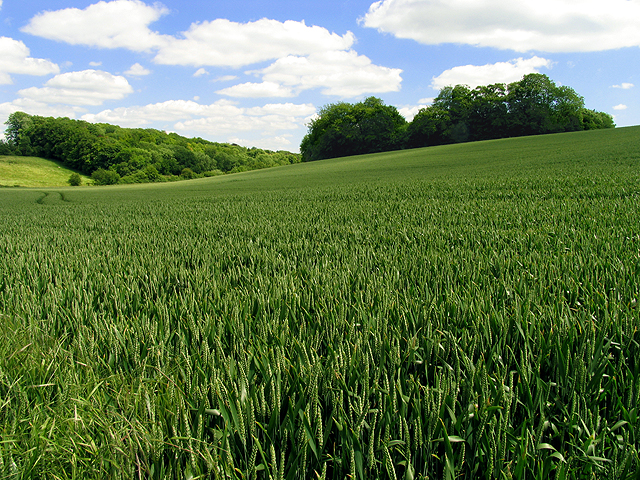
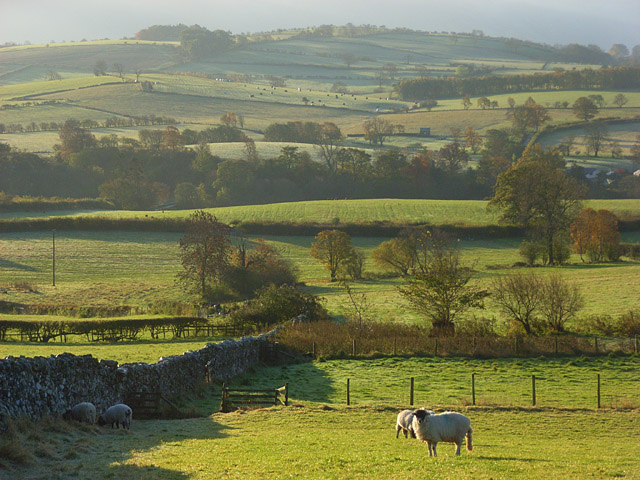
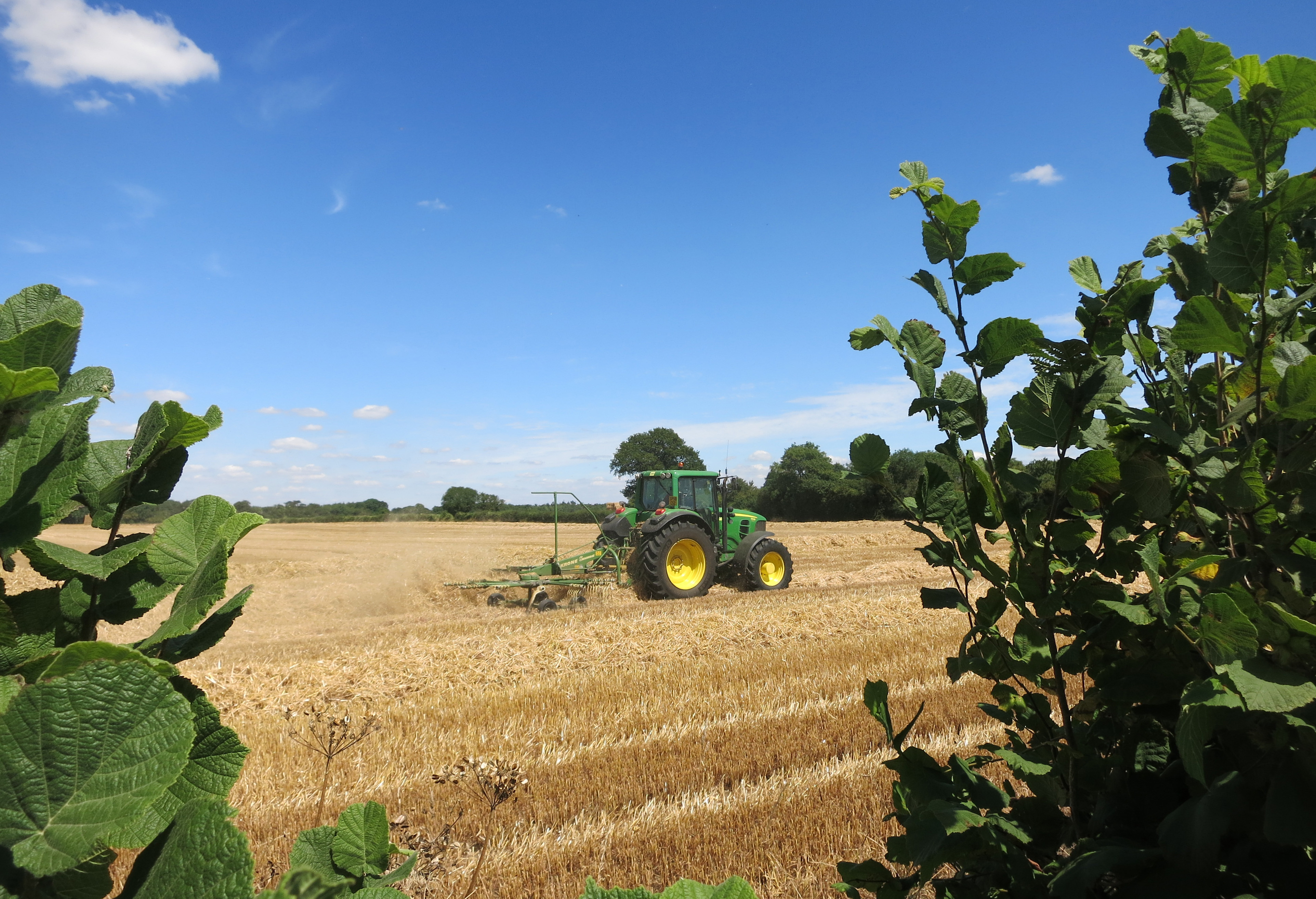
The utilised agricultural area (UAA) is 8.8 million hectares in 2023 and accounts for 68% of the total area of England.

England currently produces about 60% of its domestic food consumption. Farming takes place in most rural areas. It is concentrated in the drier east (for arable crops) and the wetter west (for livestock). There are over 100,000 farms, which vary widely in size.

The main crops that are grown are wheat, barley, oats, potatoes, sugar beets, fruits and vegetables. The livestock that is raised include cattle and sheep. In the drier east, farmers grow wheat, barley, oats, potatoes, and sugar beets.

English agriculture has moved towards organic farming in an attempt to maintain profits, and many farmers are supplementing their incomes by diversifying activities away from pure agriculture. Biofuels offer new opportunities for farmers against a backdrop of rising concerns about fossil fuel prices, energy security, and climate change. There is growing awareness that farmers have an important role to play as stewards of the English countryside and wildlife.

The Department for Environment, Food and Rural Affairs is the government department responsible for environmental protection, food production and standards, agriculture, fisheries and rural communities in England.

== History ==
Agriculture was introduced in the British Isles between about 5000 BC and 4500 BC, after a large influx of Mesolithic people and after the end of the Pleistocene epoch. It took 2,000 years for the practice to spread to all of the islands. Wheat and barley were grown in small plots near the family home. Sheep, goats and cattle were brought in from mainland Europe, and pigs were domesticated from wild boars already living in the forests. There is evidence of agricultural and hunter-gatherer groups meeting and trading with one another in the early part of the Neolithic.

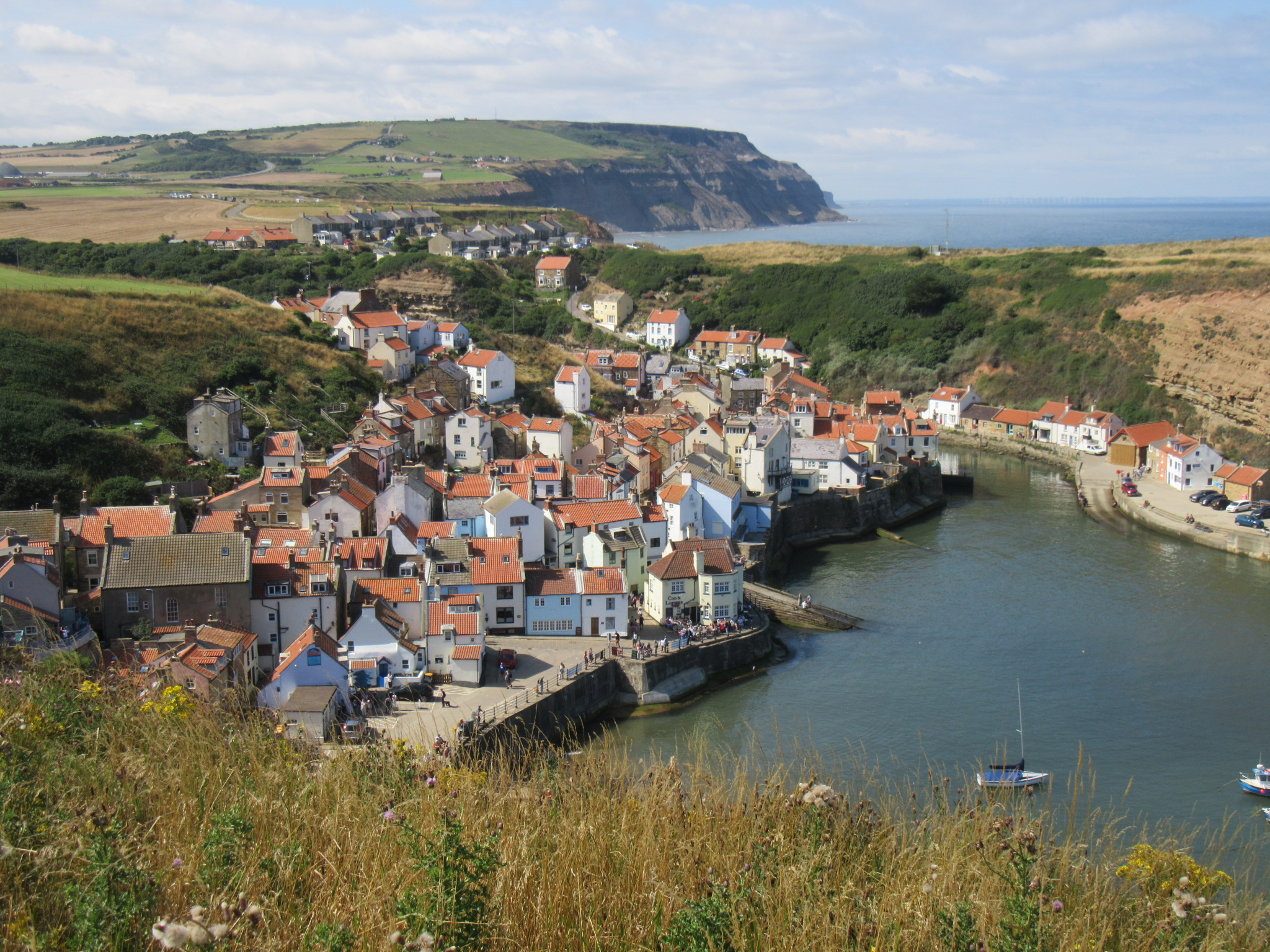
The fishing village of Staithes in Yorkshire. From the 16th century it developed a strong reputation in Europe for fishing.

The Saxons and the Vikings had open-field farming systems and there was an expansion of arable farming between the 8th-13th centuries in England Under the Normans and Plantagenets fens were drained, woods cleared and farmland expanded to feed a rising population, until the Black Death reached Britain in 1349. Agriculture remained by far the most important part of the English economy during the 12th and 13th centuries. There remained a very wide variety in English agriculture, influenced by local geography; in areas where grain could not be grown, other resources were exploited instead. In the Weald, for example, agriculture centred on grazing animals on the woodland pastures, whilst in the Fens fishing and bird-hunting was supplemented by basket-making and peat-cutting. In some locations, such as Lincolnshire and Droitwich, salt manufacture was important, including production for the export market. Fishing became an important trade along the English coast, especially in Great Yarmouth and Scarborough, and the herring was a particularly popular catch; salted at the coast, it could then be shipped inland or exported to Europe.

In the Middle Ages, the wool trade was the England's main industry, and the country exported wool to Europe. Many market towns and ports grew up and prospered on the industry. The medieval English wool trade was one of the most important factors in the medieval English economy. The medievalist John Munro notes that "[n]o form of manufacturing had a greater impact upon the economy and society of medieval Britain than did those industries producing cloths from various kinds of wool." Following the Black Death and the agricultural depression of the late 15th century, the population began to increase. The growing population stimulated economic growth, accelerated the commercialisation of agriculture, increased the production and export of wool, encouraged trade and promoted the growth of London and other major towns and cities.

Based on studies of medieval manorial accounts eastern Norfolk and areas along the north coast were among the most productive, with significant areas dedicated to the cultivation of legumes alongside wheat and barley. The planting of legumes, commonly used as a fodder crop, played a crucial role in protecting soil fertility due to their nitrogen fixing properties. In soils where this intensive cropping was not feasible, such as the sandy soils of Breckland or Norwich, and the "Good Sands" in Norfolk's northwest, the fields were sown with rye and barley.

Agriculture grew significantly as grain prices increased sixfold by 1650. Improvements in transport, particularly along rivers and coasts, brought beef and dairy products from the north of England to London. Then in 1701, Jethro Tull invented his famous rotating-cylinder seed drill. His 1731 book The New Horse Hoeing Husbandry explained the systems and devices he advocated to improve agriculture. The book was so influential that it is still regarded as marking the beginning of modern agriculture. Charles Townsend, a viscount known as "Turnip Townsend", introduced turnip farming on a large scale in the 1730s. This created a four-crop rotation (wheat, turnips, barley and clover) which allowed fertility to be maintained with much less fallow land. Clover increases mineral nitrogen in the soil and clover and turnips are good fodder crops for livestock, which in turn improve the soil through their manure.

Between the eighth and thirteenth centuries, the population of England grew to unprecedented levels. This would not have been possible without a major expansion of arable farming. As well as feeding more people, the production of large grain surpluses supported the growth of towns and markets. Between the 16th century and the mid-19th century, Great Britain saw a further massive increase in agricultural productivity and net output known as the British Agricultural Revolution, which pioneered modern farming. New agricultural practices like enclosure, mechanisation, four-field crop rotation and selective breeding enabled an unprecedented population growth, freeing up a significant percentage of the workforce, and thereby helped drive the Industrial Revolution. The 18th and 19th centuries also saw the development of glasshouses, or greenhouses, initially for the protection and cultivation of exotic plants imported to Europe and North America from the tropics. Experiments on plant hybridisation in the late 19th century yielded advances in the understanding of plant genetics, and subsequently, the development of hybrid crops. Storage silos and grain elevators appeared in the 19th century.

== Overview ==
The total area of agricultural holdings is about 41.619 million acres (16.843 million hectares), of which about a third are arable and most of the rest is grassland. In 2022 only 4.4 million hectares (10.87 million acres) were planted. The remainder lay fallow or as temporary grassland. During the growing season about 72% of the arable area is cereal crops, and of the cereal crop area, more than 57% is wheat.

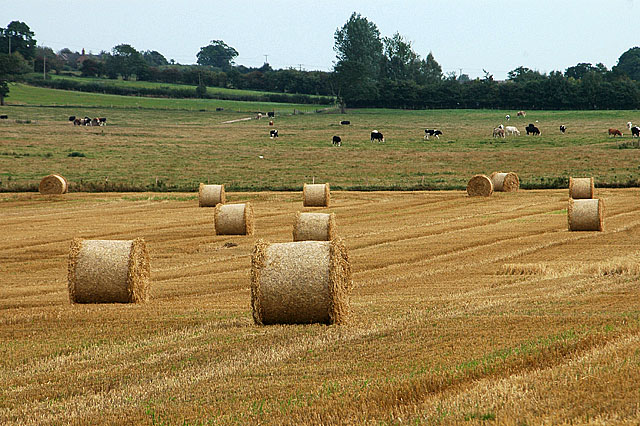
English agricultural landscape with livestock

There are about 33 million sheep, 9.6 million cattle, 188 million poultry and 5.2 million pigs. These are arranged on about 100,000 holdings, whose average croppable area is around 69 hectares (170 acres). About 70% of farms are owner-occupied or mostly so (perhaps with individual barns or fields let out), and the remainder are rented to tenant farmers. The eastern and southern counties of England where the fields are flatter, larger and more open tend to concentrate on cereal crops, while the hillier northern and western areas with smaller, more enclosed fields tend to concentrate on livestock farming.

In 2021 with 1,3988,000 metric tons, the UK ranks as the 13th largest producer of wheat in the world. English farming is on the whole intensive and highly mechanised. The UK produces only 60% of the food it consumes. The vast majority of imports and exports are with other Western European countries. Farming is subsidised, with subsidies to farmers totalling more than £3 billion.

England has a long-standing tradition of promoting animal welfare, having been the first country in the world to pass legislation specifically aimed at ensuring the well-being of animals. Animal welfare legislation affecting agriculture includes the Animal Welfare Act 2006, the Welfare of Farmed Animals Regulations 2007 and the Welfare of Animals Order 1997. The UK generally has a favourable reputation for animal welfare, and there are several codes of practice in place.

== See also ==
- Agriculture in the United Kingdom
- Department for Environment, Food and Rural Affairs
- England Rural Development Programme
- Feeding Britain in World War II
- Natural England
- Environment Agency
- The Countryside Code
- Crown Estate
- Board of Agriculture (1793–1822)
- Oxford Farming Conference
