= Civic Restaurants Act 1947 =

Act of the Parliament of the United Kingdom

Civic Restaurants Act 1947 (Note: Section 4(1).)
- Act of Parliament
- Parliament of the United Kingdom
- Long title: An Act to empower local authorities to establish and carry on restaurants, and otherwise provide for the supply to the public of meals and refreshments, and for purposes connected with the matters aforesaid.
- Citation: 10 & 11 Geo. 6. c. 22
- Introduced by: John Strachey (Commons); William Henderson, 1st Baron Henderson (Lords)
- Territorial extent: England and Wales; Scotland; (Note: Section 4(2).)

Dates
- Royal assent: 2 April 1947
- Commencement: 2 April 1947 (Note: The Acts of Parliament (Commencement) Act 1793.)
- Repealed: Scotland: 30 July 1982
Other legislation
Amended by	Statute Law Revision Act 1948; Licensing Act 1961; London Government Act 1963; Local Government Act 1972; Local Government (Scotland) Act 1973; Local Government Act 1974; Local Government (Scotland) Act 1975; Licensing Act 2003
Repealed by	Scotland: Local Government and Planning (Scotland) Act 1982

Status: Partially repealed

Text of statute as originally enacted

Revised text of statute as amended

Text of the Civic Restaurants Act 1947 as in force today (including any amendments) within the United Kingdom, from legislation.gov.uk.

The Civic Restaurants Act 1947 (10 & 11 Geo. 6. c. 22) is an act of the Parliament of the United Kingdom.

During World War II, British Restaurants had been set up to feed civilians in need. As rationing continued after the war, many continued to operate, and the Civic Restaurants Act 1947 enabled those that were still profitable to remain open as 'civic restaurants'. In 1949, 678 civic restaurants existed in the United Kingdom.

The Labour Minister of Food, John Strachey, noted that "private enterprise in the catering trade has, on the whole and by and large, catered for the middle class and not for the working class." Civic restaurants differed little in general from British Restaurants. The Civic Restaurants Act gave them the option of applying to the local licensing authority in order to serve alcohol on the premises. This was opposed by temperance campaigners in particular, but defended for breaking down the social barriers between the "tea drinker" and the "beer drinker".

Many civic restaurants remained in place well into the 1950s, being used for meals, teas and functions such as wedding receptions. The last rationing ended in 1954 and by this time, few civic restaurants remained.

== Subsequent developments ==
Section 2(2) of the act was repealed by section 1(1) of, and part IX of schedule 1 to, the Statute Law (Repeals) Act 1973, which came into force on 18 July 1973.
