= British Restaurant =

British communal kitchens in World War II

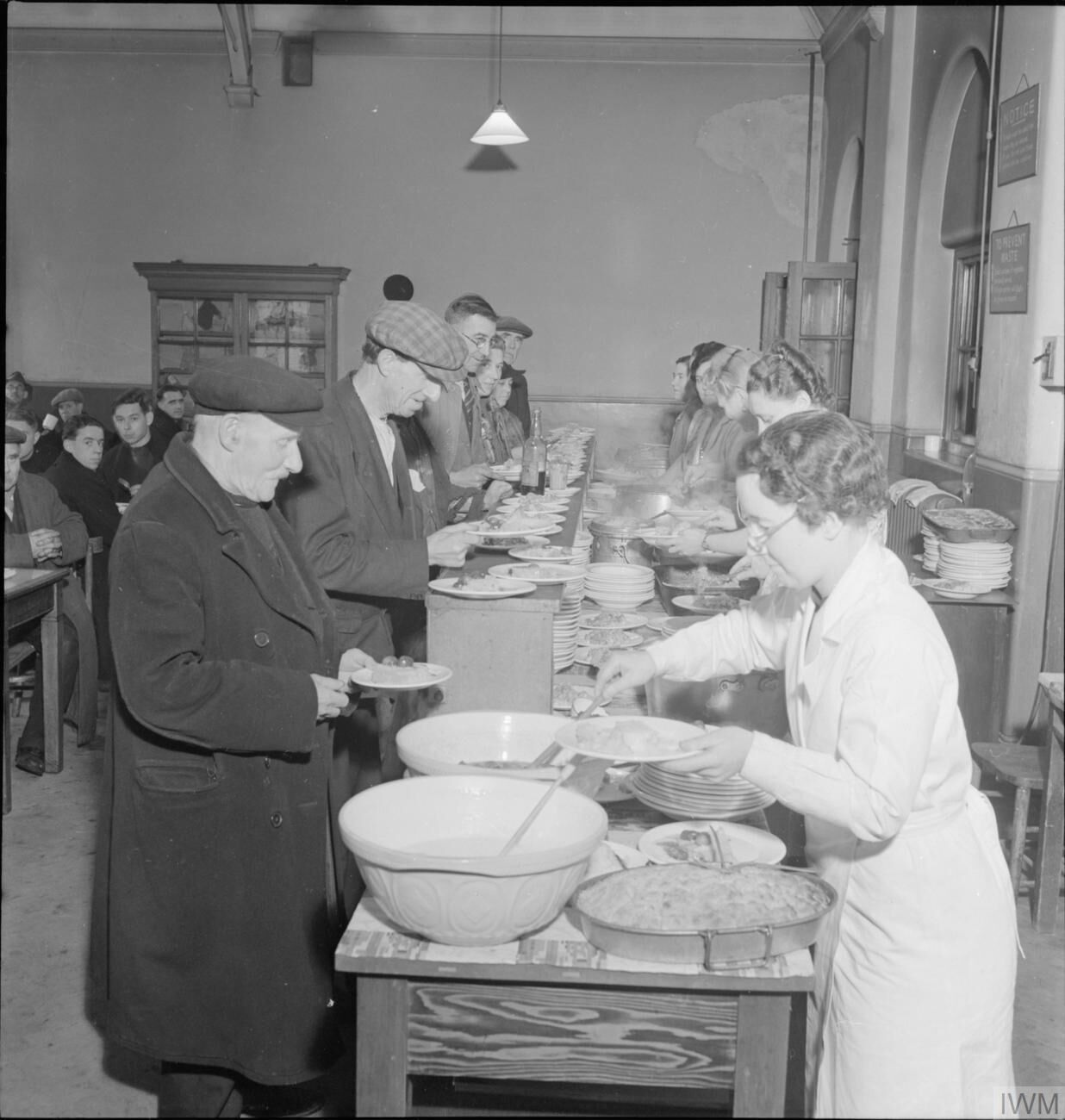
A British Restaurant in Woolmore Street, Poplar, London, in 1942

British Restaurants were communal kitchens created in 1940 during the Second World War to help people who had been bombed out of their homes, had run out of ration coupons or otherwise needed help. In 1943, 2,160 British Restaurants served 600,000 very inexpensive meals a day. They were disbanded in 1947. There was a political dimension as well, as the Labour Party saw them as a permanent solution to equalising consumption across the class line and guaranteeing a nourishing diet to all.

== Second World War ==
Originally called "Community Feeding Centres", the name British Restaurants was suggested by the Prime Minister, Winston Churchill in March 1941. They were set up by the Ministry of Food under Lord Woolton and run by local government or voluntary agencies on a non-profit basis. Meals were sold for prices up to a set maximum of 9d. (equivalent to £2 in 2025). No one could have a meal of more than one serving of meat, game, poultry, fish, eggs, or cheese. In one in ten restaurants the meals were prepared at central depots. Schools and churches were often used because they had dining halls and kitchens. In London, mobile canteens delivered meals to air-raid shelters and on the street in the aftermath of air raids.

By contrast, ordinary private restaurants continued in operation and were not subject to rationing. They did have some restrictions: for instance, no meal could be more than three courses and the maximum price was five shillings (£1/4; equivalent to £12 in 2025).

Much like the National Kitchens of WWI, British Restaurants were preceded by voluntarily run schemes. Many of these were set up by Flora Solomon who had introduced staff canteens at Marks & Spencer, often using borrowed Marks & Spencer staff in the early stages. Planning for the Restaurants began in the early part of 1940, and gained greater urgency with the beginning of the Blitz as it became clear that voluntary provision was no longer adequate. Manchester and Birmingham were among the first places selected by the Ministry of Food and the scheme began to be rolled out nationwide during November 1940 with a budget of over four million pounds allocated. The Local Authorities (Community Kitchens and Sale of Food in Public Air Raid Shelters) Order, January 1941 allowed local authorities to be reimbursed by central government for the capital costs of setting up communal feeding centres though they were expected to be self-sufficient as far as running costs went. By mid-1941, over two hundred British Restaurants operated in the London County Council area, although the Wartime Social Survey conducted in 1942–43 indicated they were more popular in London than in the rest of the country. In November 1942 there were 1,899 restaurants. By 1943, there were some 2,160 British Restaurants across the country, serving around 600,000 meals per day for around 9d. a time. 546 authorities made profits and 203 made losses, though they were set up to be not-for-profit.

Some smaller places did not qualify for a British Restaurant, but, instead, had what was termed a "Cash and Carry Restaurant" with meals being delivered from a nearby British Restaurant.

== Food served ==
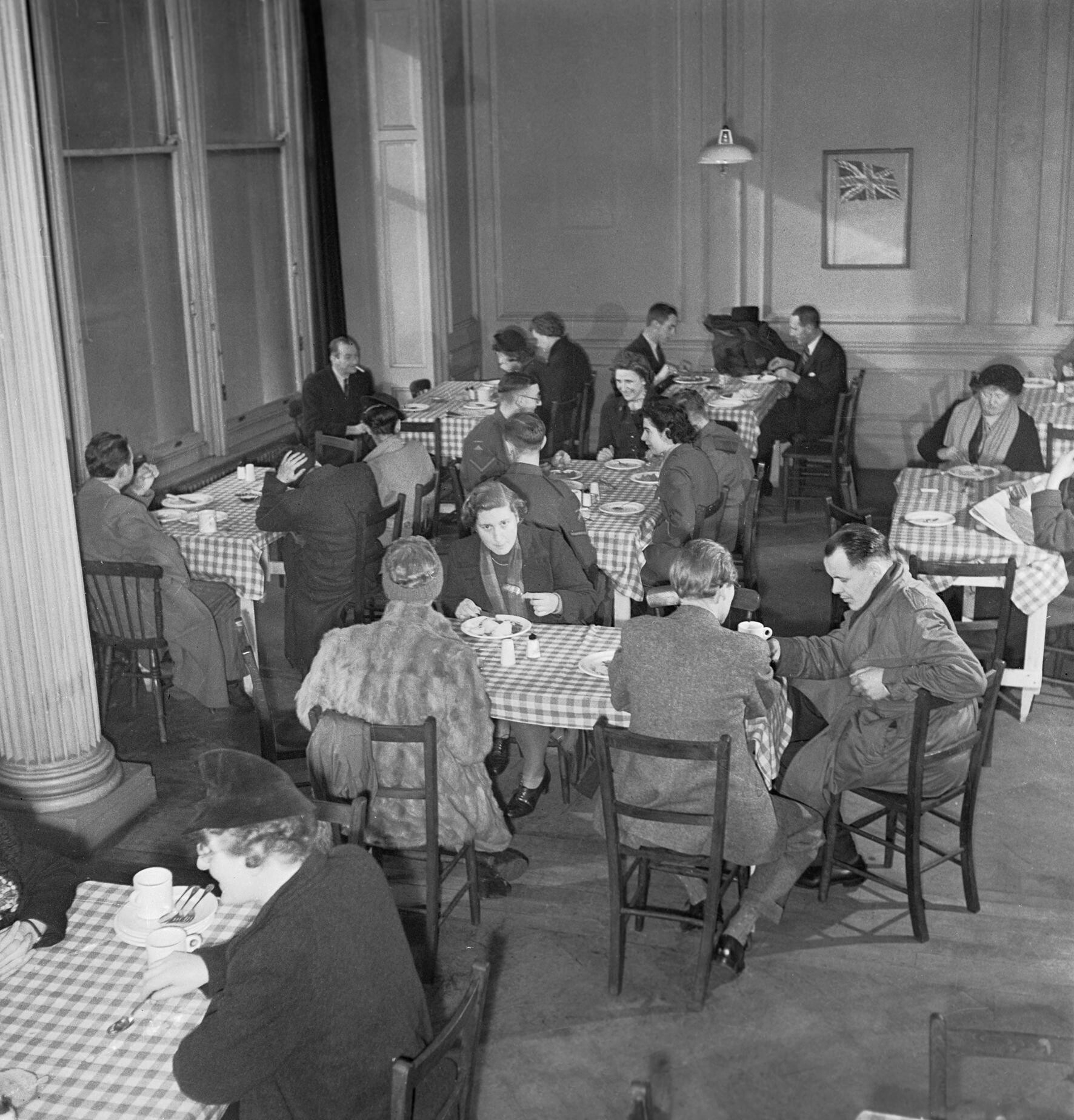
Diners at a British Restaurant, 1943

The ministry's dietician James H. Barker authorised food based upon regional preferences and health. For example, the food served in Scotland was very different from that served in London due to the taste preferences of the inhabitants. Health was also a concern, as they were supposed to provide diners with "one third of the day's energy needs". The dieticians were especially concerned with Vitamin C intake. Due to the war efforts and rationing, fruit intake was extremely limited. Vegetables such as cabbage, which has a high percentage of Vitamin C, were staple, to provide diners with beneficial nutrients. There was concern that, with mass catering, vitamins such as Vitamin C would be destroyed in the food sources.

The food in British Restaurants was said to be plain but filling and of good quality. For 9d, customers could get a three-course meal. Traditionally, customers wanted a meal of meat and two vegetables. There were usually choices of five meat dishes, five vegetables, and five desserts; locations in large cities sometimes had more options. Popular dishes included roasts and potatoes, which acted as a substitute for bread. The menu was selected to be easy to prepare at scale for large numbers of customers and maximize economies of scale. For example, volunteers sliced potatoes with machines, rather than by hand.

== Post-war ==
After 1947 some restaurants were converted, under the Civic Restaurants Act, into civic restaurants run by the local council. In 1949, 678 remained open throughout the United Kingdom. The restaurants moved beyond the privations of wartime and into the new world of a Labour government making many changes to the social fabric of the country, although rationing still applied to many food items. The Labour Minister of Food, John Strachey, noted that "private enterprise in the catering trade has, on the whole and by and large, catered for the middle class and not for the working class."

If a civic restaurant operated at a loss for three consecutive years the Act provided that ministerial consent would be needed for it to remain open. Some of these restaurants continued into the late 1960s; Cambridge City Council operated one until the redevelopment of Lion Yard in 1970.

== See also ==
- Feeding Britain in World War II
- Rationing in the United Kingdom
- Victory garden
