= Oxford Farming Conference =

Annual farmer conference

The Oxford Farming Conference (OFC) is an annual conference for the UK's farmers that takes place in Oxford, United Kingdom, in the first week of January.

The 73rd annual conference ran from 2–4 January 2019 at University of Oxford's Examination Schools, in the High Street, central Oxford. The theme “World of Opportunity" was explored and discussed by visionary speakers from around the world. Future farming, innovation and the world beyond Brexit were three key topics at the 2019 event.

Speakers in the past have included (listed in their role at time of conference):

- Secretary of State for Environment, Food and Rural Affairs, Hilary Benn,
- chief scientist of the UK government's Department for Environment, Food and Rural Affairs (Defra), Professor Robert Watson
- NFU President Peter Kendall
- RT Hon Owen Paterson MP
- Secretary of State for the Environment, Food and Rural Affairs RT Hon Elizabeth Truss MP
- Secretary of State for Environment, Food and Rural Affairs (Defra), George Eustice MP
- Cabinet Secretary for Environment and Rural Affairs Wales, Lesley Griffiths
- Director General of the National Trust, Dame Helen Ghosh
- Chief Strategy Officer AHDB, Tom Hind

The OFC has been mentioned in the long-running BBC Radio 4 series, The Archers.
