= Feeding the United Kingdom during World War II =

Feeding the United Kingdom during World War II was a challenge for the wartime government of the United Kingdom. Seventy percent of British food was imported and German submarine attacks on merchant ships reduced and threatened to eliminate the supply of imported food, which would have starved much of the British population. The government worked to increase domestic production of food, especially potatoes and wheat, the most important foods during the war. Millions of acres of grassland and pasture were brought under cultivation. "British agriculture was transformed from a predominately pastoral system of low input, low output farming to a 'national farm' dominated by intensive arable farming [and] heavily dependent on inputs such as fertilizers and machinery acquired from outside the agricultural sector." The British Agricultural History Society concluded that the Second World War "established the birth of modern agriculture [in Britain] and that this transformation was the result of government policies." However, critics denounced abuses of the dictatorial powers that government-created committees and organisations had over farms and farmers.

British food imports fell from 22 million tons annually before the war to 12 million tons at the end of the war, thanks to greater domestic production of food, concentration and dehydration of some foods such as meat, milk, and eggs, and rationing, especially of imported and luxury items.

Adequate nutrition was maintained by rationing. Complaints were widespread about the dullness of the British wartime diet, focused as it was on bread and potatoes. Although the rich continued to get better food through the black market and other mechanisms, the restrictions on diet imposed by the government and shortages of many foods resulted in a "levelling-down" of rich people's diets and a "levelling-up" of the diets of the lower classes, whose nutrition before the war had been poor.

== Before the war ==
Before the onset of the Second World War in Europe in September 1939, there were 350,000 farms in England and Wales and they averaged less than 100 acres (40 ha) in size. About 80,000 were owned or rented by part-time farmers, deriving some or most of their income from non-farm sources. Crop yields were only marginally better than they had been 50 years earlier.

Britain was vulnerable to food shortages—and starvation—if Nazi Germany succeeded in preventing imports of food by submarine attacks on merchant vessels. "70 percent of cheese and sugar, nearly 80 percent of fruit, 90 percent of cereals and fats, and around fifty percent of all meat" was imported by Britain. Even British livestock was largely dependent on imported fodder. Much potentially arable land was devoted to pasture for grazing animals. Liquid milk was the only agricultural product in which the United Kingdom was self sufficient. The reliance on imported food and low prices for British crops resulted in the poor state of British agriculture in the 1930s. Compared to 1914, two million fewer acres (800,000 ha) were under cultivation, pastures were neglected and overgrown, and the number of farm workers had declined by 25 percent. Farm workers had left the land in large numbers to migrate to the cities.

In 1936, recognising Britain's vulnerability in food, the government began planning for food and agriculture in the event of war. The government planned to control the food system including domestic production, imports, rationing, and distribution and controls on consumption. To produce more food, in April 1939, the government devised a plan to pay farmers two pounds sterling per acre (0.4 ha) to plough up pasture and convert the land into cultivated cropland.

The poor state of British agriculture was matched by the poor nutrition and diet of many British people in the 1930s. "The country was marked by deep regional and class inequalities...The wealthy were consuming the lion's share of the nation's meat, fish, butter, cheese, fruit, and vegetables, while the bottom third of the nation were scraping along on a thoroughly un-nutritious diet of cheap white bread, margarine, jam, a little bacon and copious quantities of tea." While the British had a diet of sufficient calories, one-third of the population lacked access, due mostly to poverty, to more expensive "protective" foods such as milk, fruit, and vegetables.

On 24 August 1939 with war looming, the British government enacted the Emergency Powers (Defence) Act 1939 (2 & 3 Geo. 6. c. 62). The act gave the Minister of Agriculture sweeping powers to control food production and to take possession of farmland. After the outbreak of World War II in Europe in September 1939, the Ministry of Food was created and the government took on the task of ensuring that citizens had access to adequate nutrition.

== Agriculture during the war ==
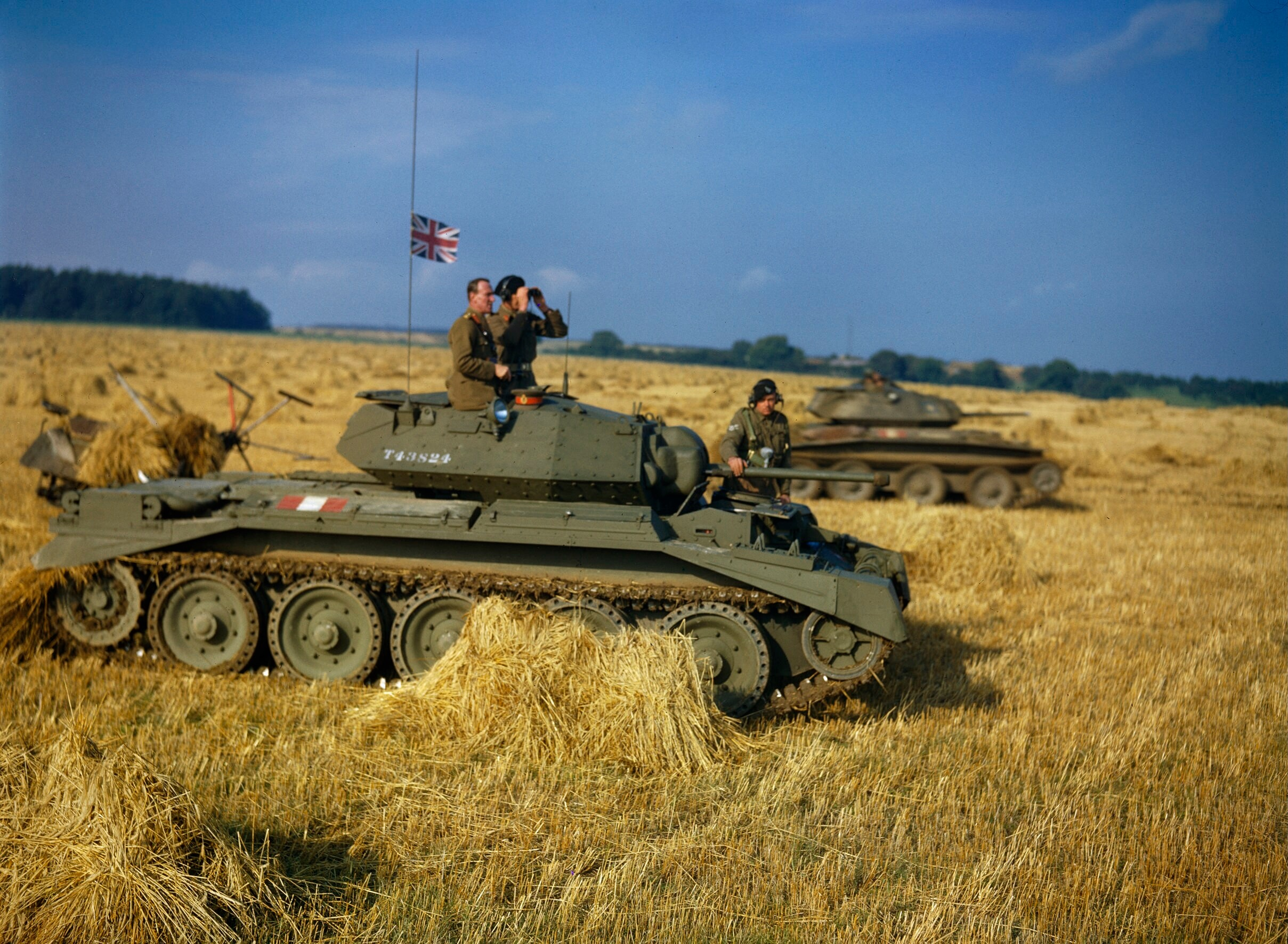
Training exercises by the military competed with farmers for the use of land.

In 1939, 12 million acres (4.9 million ha) of land in Britain was cultivated and 17 million acres (6.9 million ha) of land was in grassland. By 1944, 18 million acres (7.3 million ha) were being cultivated and 11 million acres (4.5 million ha) were in grassland. The acreage planted in potatoes had more than doubled and that in wheat increased by two-thirds. The government programs to effect this change involved the "plough-up" program, guaranteed high prices to farmers for their products, and technological advances in farming practices. As much of the new land was marginal in quality, the results did not make Britain self sufficient in food. At the beginning of the war Britain produced 33 percent of the calories its people consumed; by the end of the war Britain produced 44 percent of the calories consumed.

Farming had to compete with the military for land. The military forces requisitioned 750,000 acres (300,000 ha) of land and had the right to enter and use more than 10 million acres (4.0 million ha) additional acres in England and Wales. The Ministry of Agriculture and the War Department often clashed over the military's claims to agricultural land.

=== Plough-up ===
The Ministry of Agriculture's first priority was to bring more land into cultivation by converting grazing and unused land to crop land. Stimulated by the government's subsidy of two pounds sterling for every acre ploughed, British farmers converted 2 million acres (0.81 million ha) in 1939–1940; 2 million more in 1940–1941; 1.5 million acres (610,000 ha) in 1941–1942; and, with imports severely restricted by German submarine attacks on shipping, 1,376,000 acres (557,000 ha) in 1942–1943. 1943 saw a hot summer and an excellent harvest.

The impact of the plough-up was twofold. First, the plough-up enabled a greater acreage to be cultivated with the priority crops of agricultural policy: potatoes, wheat, barley, and oats. Potatoes were important because they were more productive per acre than almost any other crop. Wheat was important for bread, deemed essential for the morale of the population. Bread and potatoes were the staples of the British diet in the Second World War. Increases in production between 1939 and 1945 were 74.3 percent for potatoes and 90.8 percent for wheat. The Ministry of Food prioritized potato production above all other crops.

Secondly, prior to the war large quantities of fodder for livestock was imported. The plough-up reduced the acreage of pasture land, livestock numbers, and the demand for imported fodder, thereby freeing up shipping space for food imports. One acre of wheat "saved as much shipping space as seven acres of the best grass in England." The conversion of pasture to cultivated land reduced meat production. In 1943–1944, beef and veal production compared to 1939 had decreased by one-sixth; mutton and lamb by one-fifth; eggs by one-half; and pork by two-thirds. Milk production remained stable. The plough-up also resulted in better care for the quality of remaining pastures which prevented an even greater decline in production of meat and milk, albeit a shortage of quality feed as a result of reduced imports reduced the yield of milk per head of milk cow.

=== Labour ===
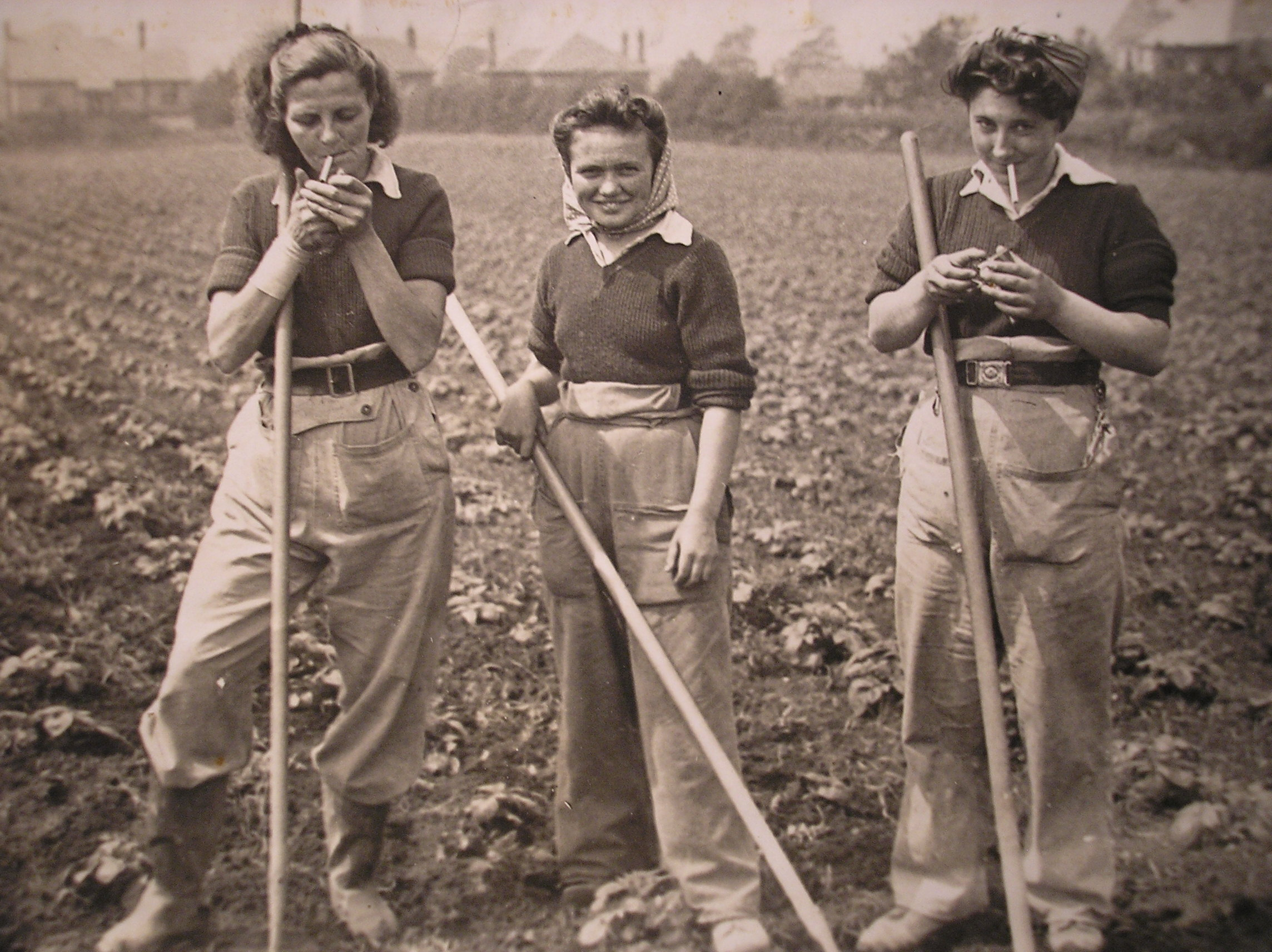
Land Girls working in the fields

In 1939, the full-time agricultural labour force of Britain consisted of 546,000 men and 55,000 women. Another 111,000 people were part-time agricultural workers. By June 1944, the male full-time labour force consisted of 522,000 men and 150,000 women, including Land Girls. Although the numbers of farm workers remained about the same, agriculture production and the demand for labour increased. During harvest time, a "'motley crew of soldiers, the publican, the postman', school-children and even townspeople worked in the fields."

In Britain in the Second World War farm work was a reserved occupation, meaning that farmers and farm workers were not usually conscripted. With about 5 million men and women in the military and millions more in occupations servicing the military (out of a total working population of 21 million), finding additional labour for farms was difficult but necessary. Farm workers were forbidden by law from leaving their occupation and employers were forbidden from discharging them. During the war wages for farm workers rose substantially.

Land girls. Members of the Women's Land Army, called "Land Girls", augmented the numbers of farm workers during the war. They were both volunteers and conscripts, many drawn from urban areas without farming experience. They numbered more than 80,000 in 1944.

POWs and conscientious objectors. Captured Italian and German soldiers were imported into Britain and worked on farms. About 50,000 Italian prisoners of war worked on farms. Near the end of the war the Italian soldiers on the farms were joined by German POWs whose farm work continued until several years after the war. In September 1946, 180,000 German POWs were employed on farms. Britain recorded 59,192 conscientious objectors during the war of which about 20,000 were required to work on farms.

=== Technology ===
At the beginning of the war most non-human labour on British farms was performed by horses. Farm horses numbered 649,000 in 1939 and still numbered 545,000 in 1945, but the increase in the use of tractors during the war was substantial. In 1939, Britain counted only 56,000 tractors; by January 1946 there were 203,000. Moreover, the government ensured that tractors were fully employed, being moved from farm to farm. Tractors were produced domestically as well as imported.

Much of the new land brought under cultivation was poor in quality, necessitating an increase in the use of fertilisers. Moreover, farmers, with their increased prosperity, could afford to buy more fertiliser. Canada assisted Britain by expanding its production of phosphates and artificial nitrogen, ingredients in fertiliser. Potash came from the Soviet Union, United States, and other countries.

The gains in British agricultural production were mostly from the cultivation of new land rather than an increase in yields because of technology. Lizzie Collingham says that productivity might even have decreased. The bumper crops of 1943 were due to good weather and the "long hours the farmers and their labourers had invested working in the fields."

=== Governance ===
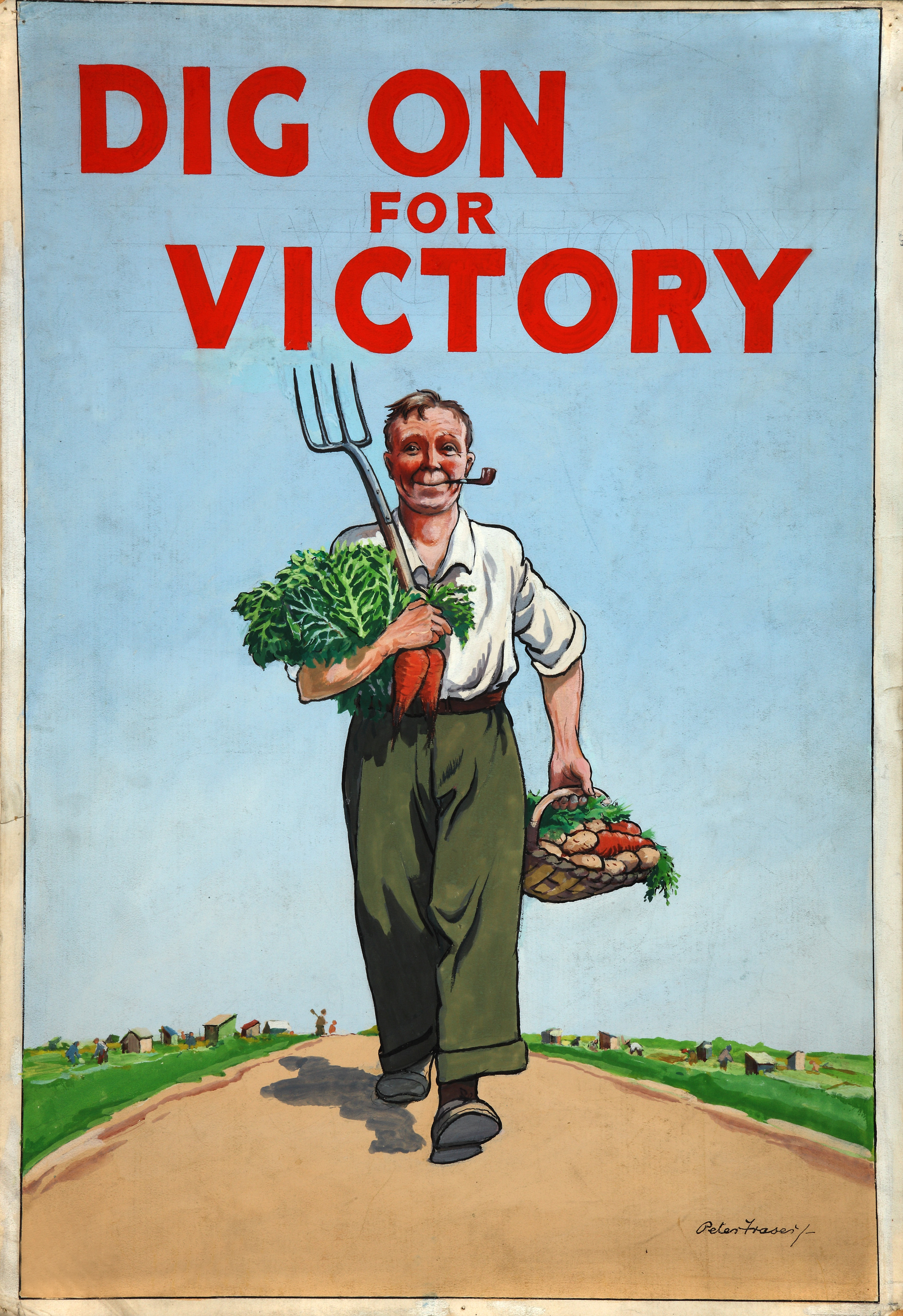

In the 1930s the backwardness of British agriculture prompted calls for the nationalisation of farm land. In early 1939, prior to the beginning of the war, the Ministry of Agriculture chose instead to promote "progressive" farming techniques. When the war began, as it had in World War I, the Ministry controlled farms and farmers by the creation of county war agricultural executive committees (CWAECs), called "war ags". Forty-nine CWAECs were established in England and thirteen in Wales. Each CWAEC had eight to twelve members. Their members were influential people resident in the area for which they had responsibility. The CWAECs created hundreds of sub-committees involving more than 6,000 people to carry out their work.

The CWAECs had sweeping powers and responsibilities. Their most important responsibility was to take "all necessary measures to secure that the land in their area was cultivated to the best advantage". Their powers included control and supervision of farmers. They could seize lands, control land use, and punish farmers who failed to follow their instructions. There was no appeal from their decisions. A National Farm Survey by CWAEC classified farmers as A, B, or C. Five percent of farmers were classified "C" which meant that they were subject to dispossession of their lands because of their alleged incompetence or failure to obey the CWAECs directives. During the war, CWAEC dispossessed 2,700 farmers of all their land and dispossessed many more of part of their land.

The operations of the CWAECs have been characterised as a mixture of "anachronistic feudalism and war socialism". Criticisms of the CWAECs were the lack of qualifications of many of their members and that the CWAECs created a "door wide open" to "jobbery, favoritism [and] nepotism".

=== Victory gardens ===
Traditionally, many people in Britain were allocated small plots of land, called allotments, for growing vegetables and fruit. In 1939, those allotments numbered 815,000. The Ministry of Agriculture initiated a "Digging for Victory" campaign and in three years the numbers of allotments increased to 1.7 million. Private gardens grew to number five million. Victory gardens supplemented the food supply of Britain and the production could be bartered or sold (which was illegal, but rarely enforced). However, gardens required free time as well as access to land. Working-class men and women often had less of each.

== Food supply ==
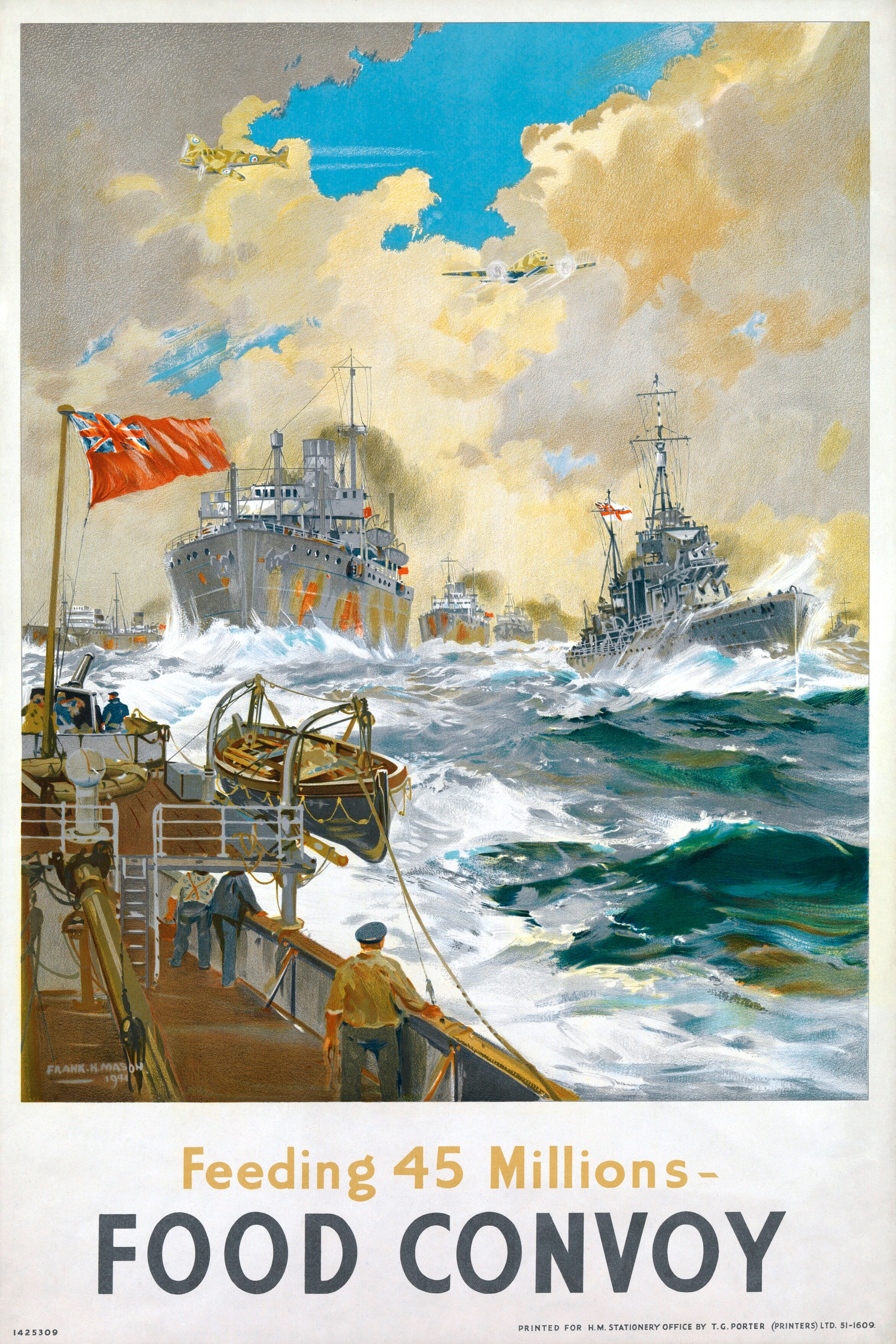
The Atlantic convoys brought food and vital war materiel to Britain.

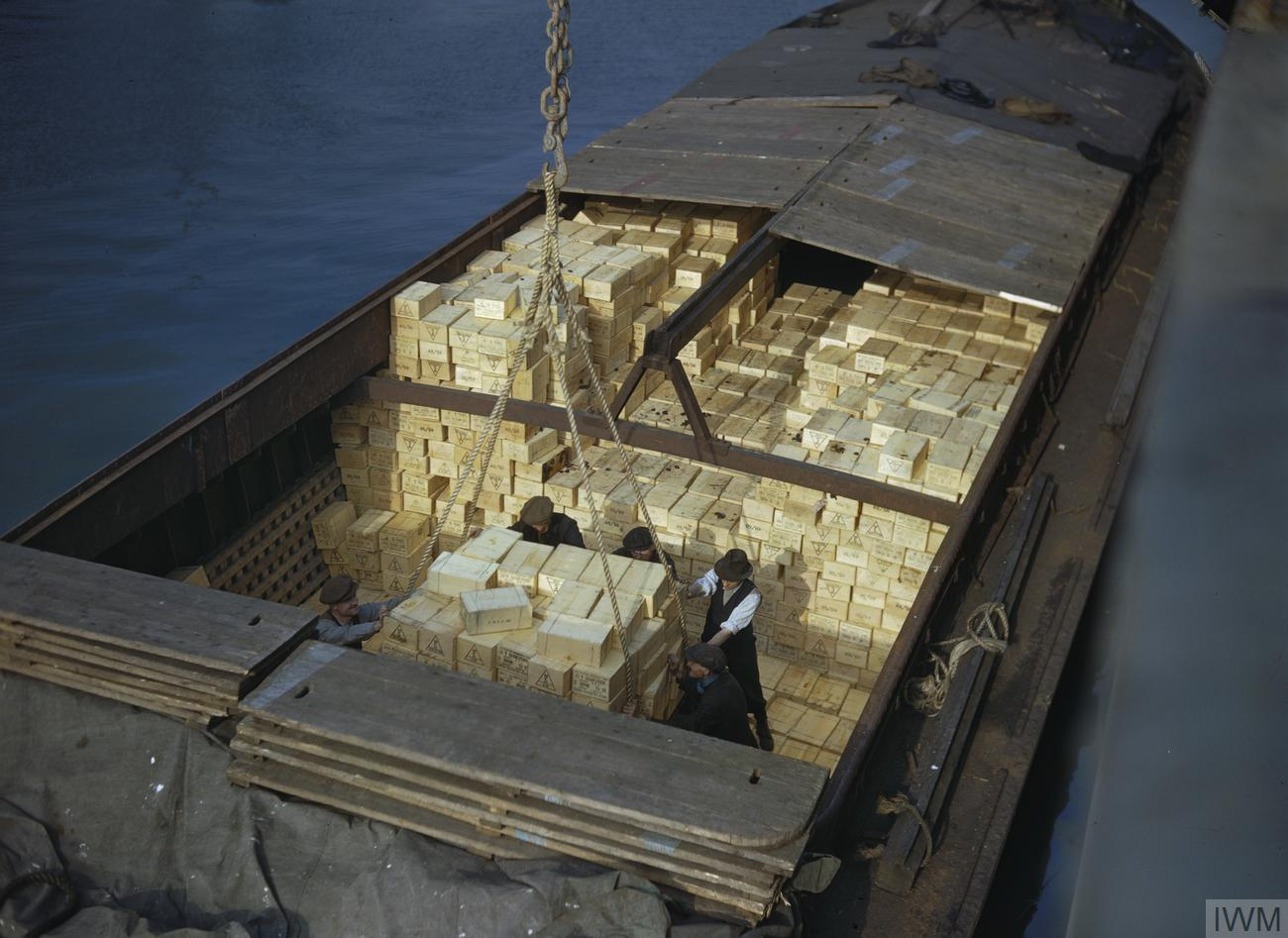
A ship's cargo of dried California peaches being unloaded into a barge in Britain, 1943

Britain's experience with food shortages in World War I influenced many of its policies in the Second World War. In 1936, anticipating war, the government began to plan for the "supply, control, and distribution of foodstuffs". In 1939, before the war began in September, the government printed 50 million ration books. In January 1940, rationing of bacon, ham, butter, and sugar began. Rationing of other foodstuffs, such as "meat, cheese, margarine, eggs, milk, tea, breakfast cereals, rice and biscuits" soon followed. "Fresh vegetables, fruit, fish, and bread" were never rationed, although some foods, especially fish, were often unavailable in the market. Rationing aimed to reduce the supply of imported food and meat so that more resources could be devoted to the war. The Ministry of Food recognized that rationing would likely cause increases in the price of food to consumers and decided to subsidize the prices of many foods, thereby reducing inflationary pressures. The government controlled "nearly every facet of food production, distribution, and consumption" during the war.

At the beginning of the war Britain had a large merchant fleet which brought in 22 million tons of food per year. This supply was threatened by the occupation of most Western European countries by Nazi Germany in April, May, and June 1940 which cut off, for example, butter, cheese, and bacon imports from Denmark and the Netherlands. Onions disappeared from British markets because the Channel Islands were occupied. Lemons and oranges became "treasured objects". Submarine warfare by Germany against merchant ships bringing food and other goods to Britain from the United States, Canada, Argentina, Australia, and New Zealand further reduced food for the British.

The British food supply reached its nadir in the early months of 1941 when food imports were only two-thirds of their pre-war level and domestic production of crops such as potatoes and wheat had not yet greatly expanded. German success in sinking merchant ships reached its peak from March to May 1941.

The British government made strenuous efforts to reduce its dependence on shipping availability to import food. One quarter of the 22 million tons of food imported before the war was animal food and that was nearly eliminated at a cost of a greater than 50 percent reduction in pig and poultry numbers in Britain. Additional measures to reduce shipping included raising the extraction rate of flour from 70 to 85 percent (using more of the wheat berry rather than discarding it, thereby creating a darker and, in the opinion of many, less palatable bread), deboning and better packing of meat, and dehydrating products such as milk and eggs. By the end of the war, imported food was reduced to 12 million tons annually.

== Diet and nutrition ==
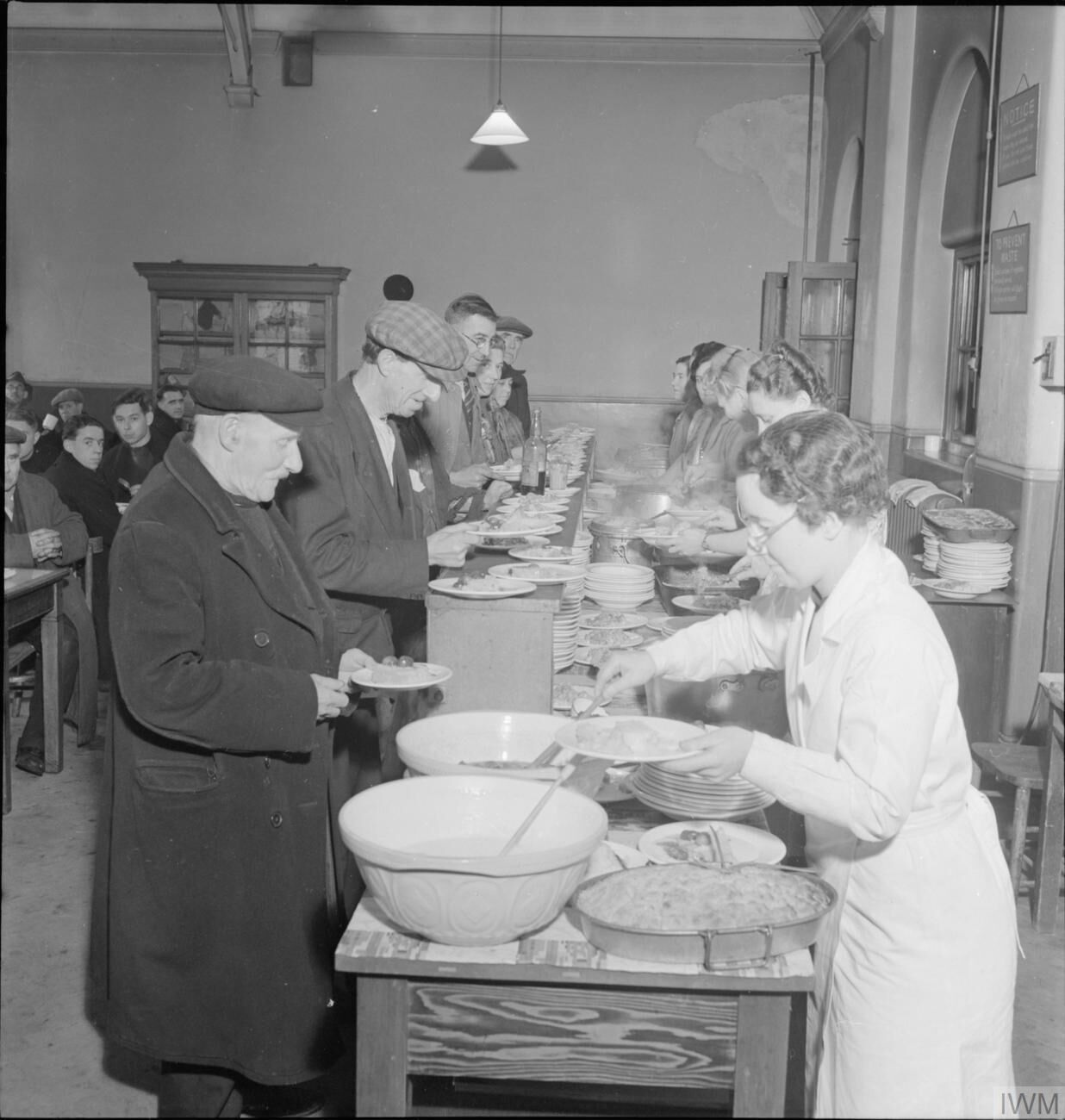
Serving food at a British Restaurant

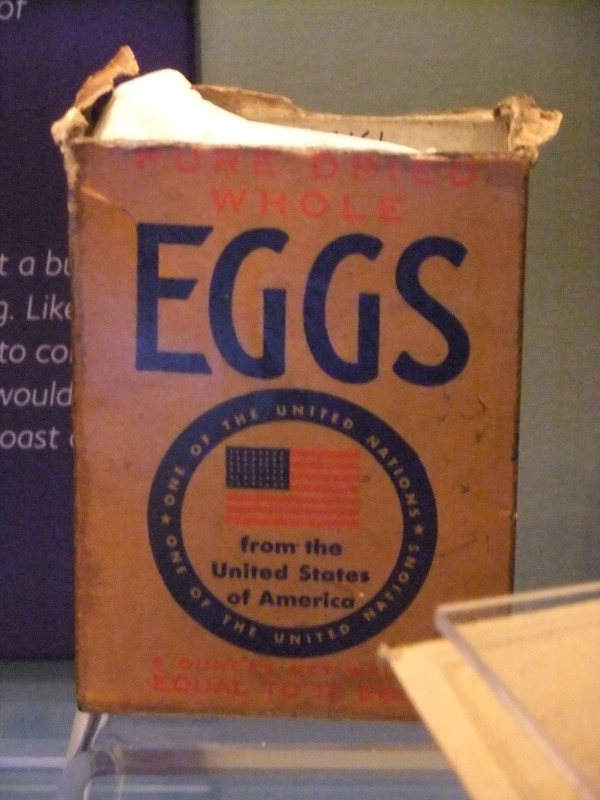
Powdered eggs were perhaps the most disliked of all wartime foods.

Prior to the Second World War, a large nutritional divide existed between the working class and the middle and upper classes of Britain. In 1936–37, the average working class diet totalled 2,557 calories per day while the middle class diet totalled 3,159 calories. The discrepancy between classes for protein consumption was equally wide: the working class ate 70 grams of protein daily and the middle class ate 89 grams of protein daily. Both social classes saw reduction of their caloric and protein intake during the war, but the nutritional gap between them was much reduced. In 1945, official statistics said that the working class diet totalled 2,375 calories and 76 grams of protein and the middle class diet totalled 2,402 calories and 77 grams of protein.

The officially-recorded closing of the nutritional gap was due to several factors including rationing of many foodstuffs, subsidies for basic foods to reduce market prices, a points system to enable people to buy non-rationed food, and British Restaurants which were public canteens to feed workers and others at a modest price. British rationing was based on the principle of "equality of sacrifice" among all classes and income groups in the country. The ration card issued to everyone was seen not only on a restraint on consumption of rationed items, but also as an entitlement of an adequate diet for everyone. Special and augmented rations were allowed for small children, pregnant and nursing women, and manual workers.

However, those with money had many means of supplementing their diet and increasing their caloric intake above what official statistics said. As always with a rationing system, a black market flourished for those with the money to buy luxury foods. Restaurants continued to operate and serve unrationed food such as fish and game. The government attempted to combat this example of unequal access to food with a five shilling price limit on restaurant meals, but this control was widely circumvented. People did not go hungry because of the existence of a black market and luxury restaurants, but the inequality was resented by people with modest incomes.

Another example of inequality in access to food was the ability of land owners to grow crops and raise animals for their own consumption and for barter and sale. For example, one rich landed woman with the help of her servants grew food and kept chickens which produced 40 eggs per week in 1942 when the average consumption of eggs was one egg per week per person.

Complaints about the quality of the food during the Second World War were many, especially from the wealthy. "How I grow sick of never ending starch," said one person. "Eating became a matter of filling up on fuel rather than a pleasure." The government's creation and promotion of inventive recipes was derided. "Nothing could be more pathetic than the 'Victory Dishes' which the Ministry of Food devised." The most detested wartime food was probably dried eggs, imported from the United States after having been dried to reduce the need for shipping space.

Lizzie Collingham makes the point that, in addition to rationing and government controls, the higher wages and increased purchasing power of working-class families during the war, were important in the "levelling-up" of nutrition between the upper and lower classes.
