= Harris Lebus =

- Industry: Manufacturer
- Founded: 1840; 186 years ago in Hull, England
- Founder: Louis Lebus
- Fate: Closed by owner
- Products: Furniture

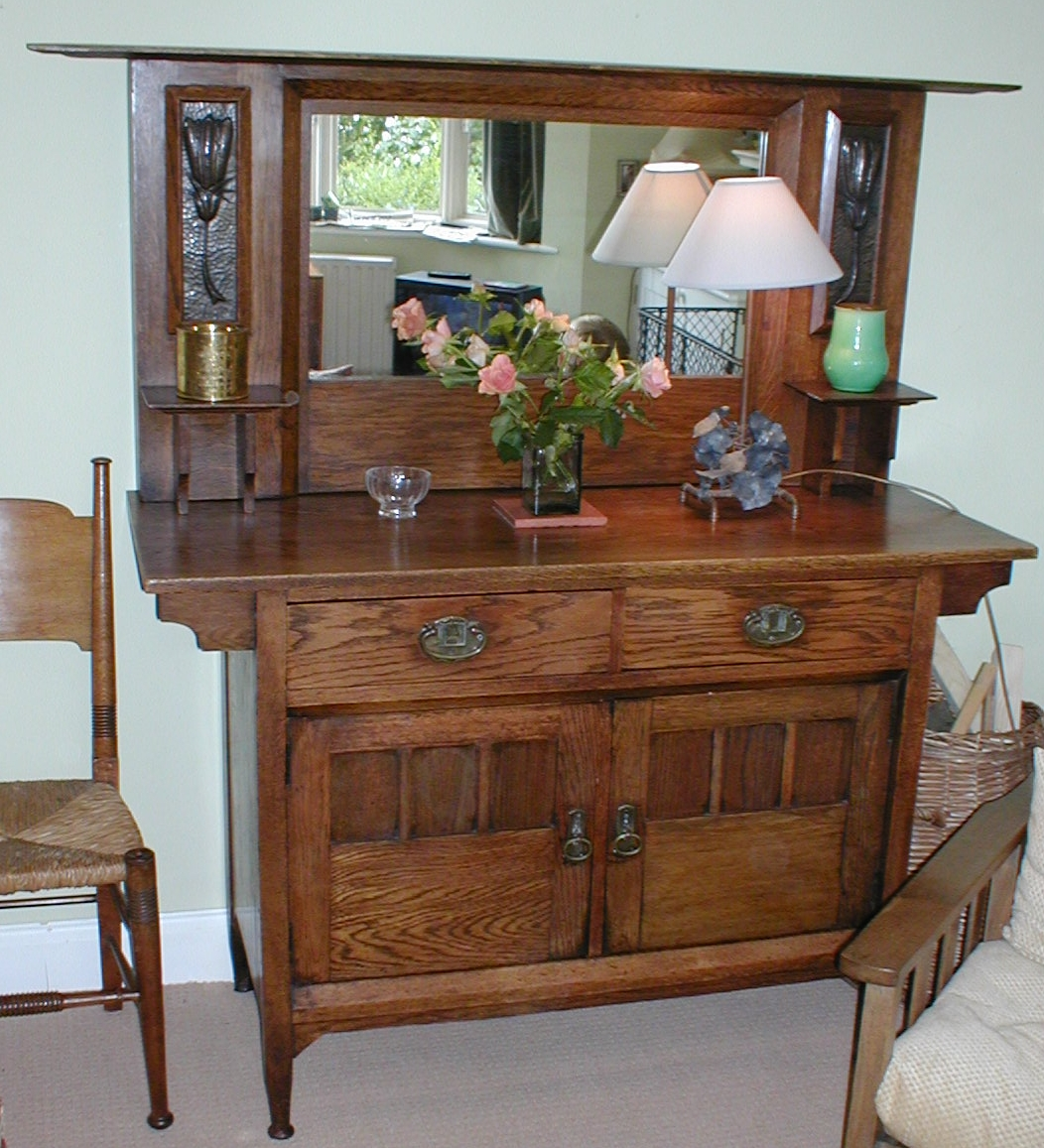
A Lebus piece

Harris Lebus was a furniture manufacturer and wholesaler based in the East End of London in Tabernacle Street with a factory in Ferry Lane, Tottenham. The firm supplied stores such as Maple & Co., mainly producing bedroom and dining furniture. Following the Edwardian period the company became successful in the mass production of furniture affordable to a wider range of customers.

== History ==
During the period of its finest output in the early 1900s, the style of furniture is closely associated with the Arts and Crafts Movement, Mainly built of oak and characterised by overhanging cornices, inset door panels and square to turned legs with pad feet in the manner of William Birch of High Wycombe. The off the peg hardware is unfussy and stylistically well designed, often of beaten copper in the Art Nouveau style. These pieces are highly sought after. Also at this time, small numbers of high quality mahogany, satinwood or walnut bedroom suites in the Sheraton style were made.

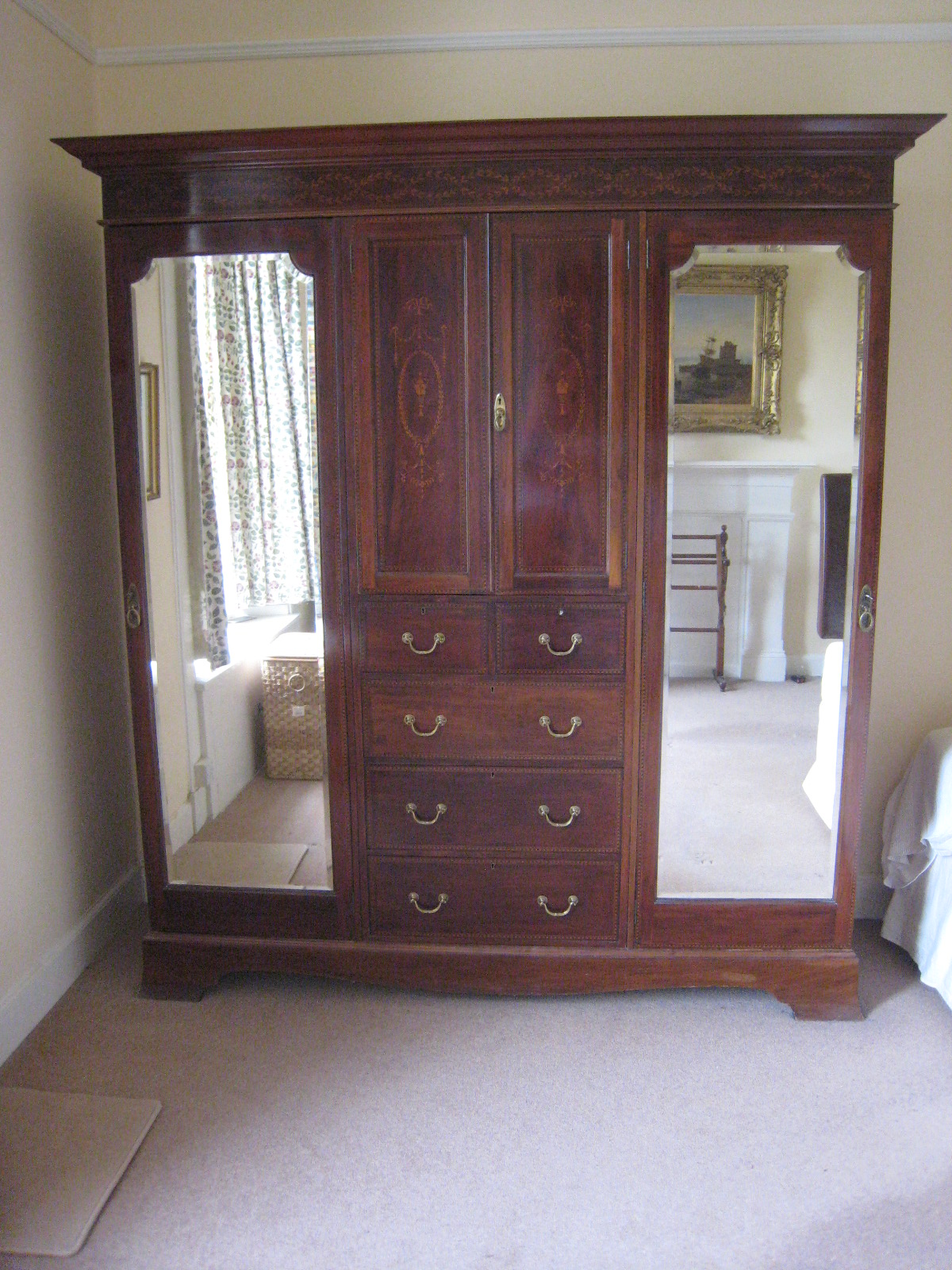
Harris Lebus mahogany Sheraton style wardrobe made in 1907

The drawers of Harris Lebus furniture such as chests, wardrobes and roll-top desks made during this period, can be identified by the H.L.L (stands for Harris Lebus, London) on the face plates of the brass locks. More obviously, some desks had 'The Lebus Desk' stamped on the escutcheon plate of the roll-top lock. The Lebus drawer lock face plates during this period have characteristically rounded edges. This was a result of a 1904 patent designed to make the corresponding mortice more easily cut out by machinery. Also in 1904, the firm took out a patent relating to the construction of drawer sides (a framed panel, rather than solid wood), to reduce warping and subsequent sticking. This provides a further identification aid for Lebus furniture of the Edwardian period.

This prolific manufacturer was largely responsible for making the Arts and Crafts style of furniture available to a wider public. As with many larger firms their designers are not mentioned in marketing or advertising material. At Harris Lebus during the Edwardian period, a 'Mr Archer' was apparently the main furniture designer.

During the First World War the company supplied the government with a large volume of war supplies. These ranged from ammunition boxes to aircraft frames.

After the war the firm's manufacturing policy was changed. It was decided to increase mechanisation to enable the production of high volumes of well-constructed furniture affordable to a wider range of people. This was hugely successful and Harris Lebus became a household name and the largest furniture manufacturer in the world.

During the Second World War the firm produced the Airspeed Horsa glider, and the Mosquito multi role aircraft. The firm also undertook top-secret operations, such as building replica Sherman tanks out of wood.

Following the war the firm became part of the government scheme to produce utility furniture bearing the CC41 mark and were central in providing cheaper manufacturing techniques to provide the country with lower cost furniture with which they could rebuild their homes, and in fact their design team invented and patented the technique of facing man-made boards with other woods. The company also devised and perfected the means of assembling furniture from preformed sections and completing the construction by curing resin glue lines, utilising 'Radio Frequency' electricity, or 'R.F.' There was no metal fixing required in the assembly at all. In addition, in the mid-1960s, the company patented an improved veneering procedure.

Harris Lebus ceased being a family partnership in 1947 when it was floated as a public company. Initially family members were on the main board with Sir Herman Lebus becoming chairman and managing director; LS Lebus assistant managing director and Anthony and Oliver Lebus members of the board. Louis H Lebus and SH (Bob) Lebus retired. After financial difficulty, caused by a period of poor management which was not by the family, the firm finally closed in 1969.

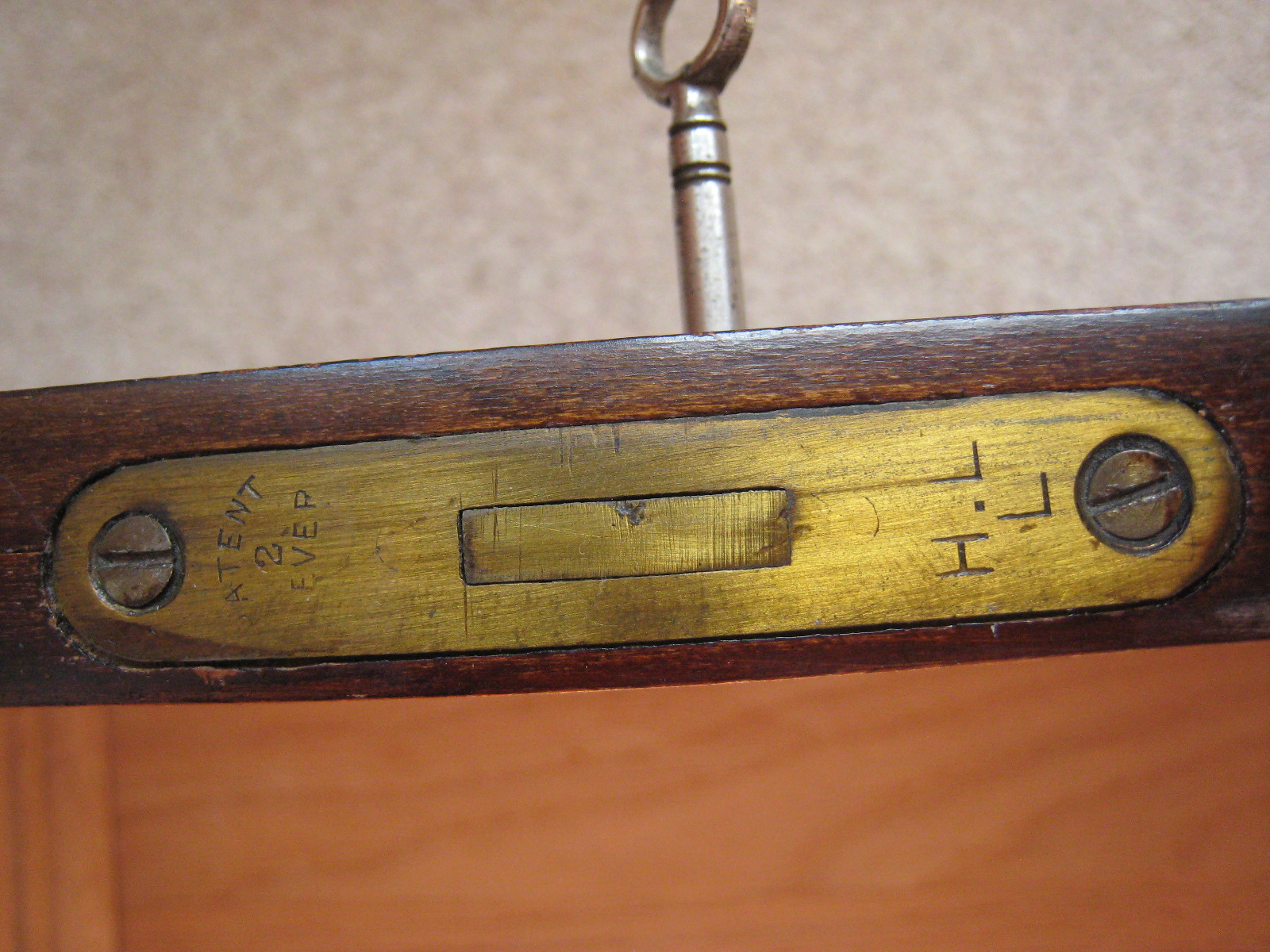
Drawer lock from a Harris Lebus mahogany Sheraton style wardrobe made in 1907, showing the H.L.L. mark (stands for Harris Lebus, London)

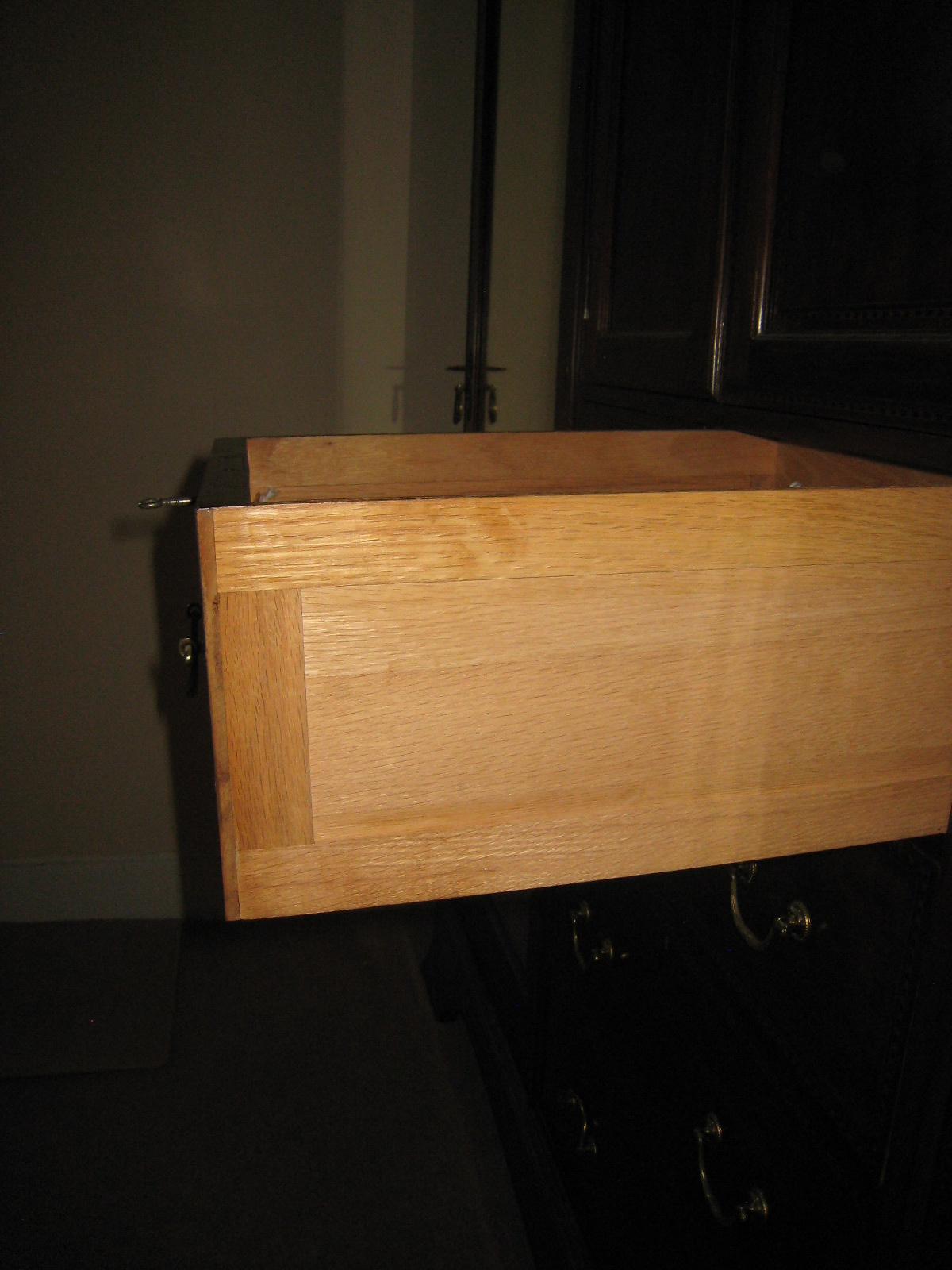
Side of a drawer from a Harris Lebus mahogany Sheraton style wardrobe made in 1907, showing the panelled design patented in 1904 by the company.

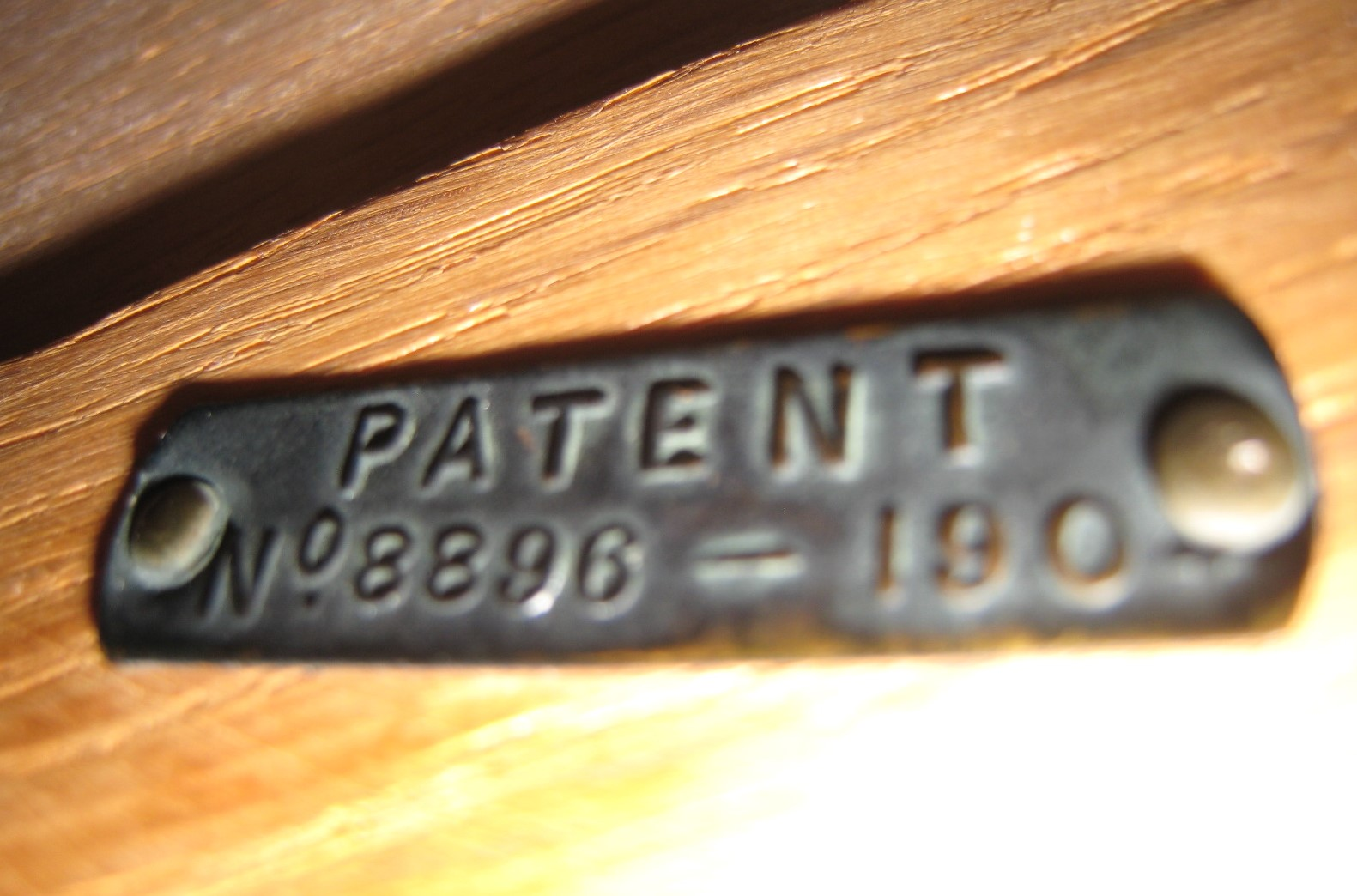
Label inside a drawer from a Harris Lebus mahogany Sheraton style wardrobe made in 1907, with the registration number 8896-1904 for the 1904 patent for the panelled drawer lining design.
