= CC41 =

Symbol for clothing in WWII Britain

Board of Trade's CC41 symbol

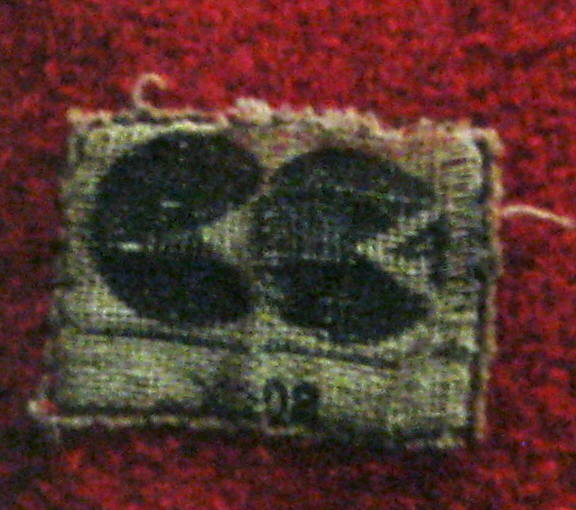
CC41 label on a coat.

The CC41 symbol, also known as the Utility mark, was an identifying mark of products produced and sold as part of the British Government's Second World War Utility Clothing Scheme.

The CC41 Utility mark indicated that the item met the standards of the government's Utility regulations, and could be sold as a product of the Utility Scheme. Easily recognisable, the CC41 symbol was useful to manufacturers, retailers, and the civilian consumer public.

Therefore, the Board of Trade stipulated that the CC41 Utility mark must be applied to all Utility products - which included clothing, footwear, furniture, and fabrics and textiles - from the implementation of the Utility Clothing Scheme in 1941, until its end in 1952.

The CC41 symbol could be attached to a Utility product as a label, printed directly onto cloth, or impressed mark, as on furniture and early examples of Utility footwear.

The symbol, colloquially referred to as the 'two cheeses', was designed by Reginald Shipp for the Board of Trade's Directorate of Civilian Clothing. It was intended to be distinctive but have no special meaning, and the Board of Trade stuck to that line when journalists asked what the two 'C's stood for – possibly 'civilian clothing' or 'controlled commodity'. The definitive answer may lie in a Board of Trade file – Discussions on the Utility mark – lost in the 1960s during a bulk transfer of files to The National Archives.

== Second World War ==
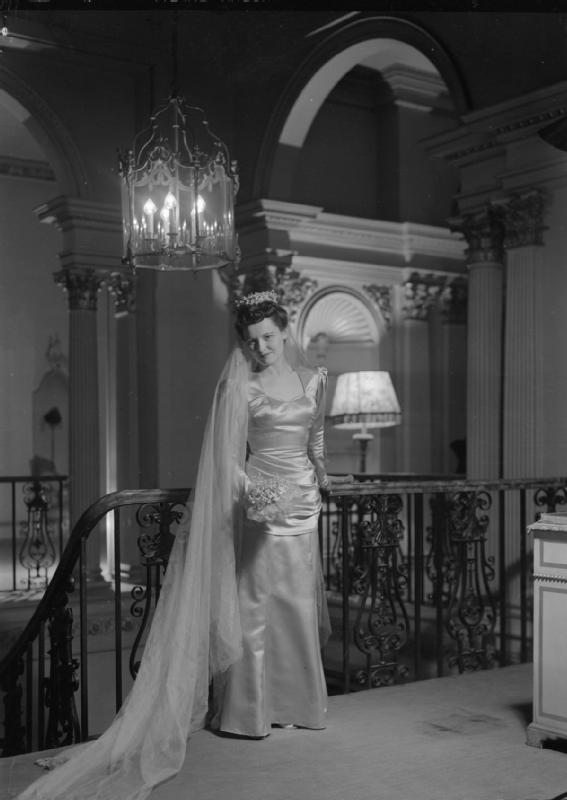
Couture designers also abided by CC41 strictures. This IncSoc gown by Bianca Mosca was photographed by the Ministry of Information in 1945 as part of its publicity for utility fashion

By 1941, with the need to produce clothing and other war essentials for the expanding armed services during the Second World War, many items were rationed. Certain raw materials could no longer be imported, and those that could were directed towards the war effort. Food rationing had already been reintroduced in January 1940. Non-rationed items saw their price surge, and clothing saw large mark-ups in price, well above the cost of living.

The government introduced Limitation of Supply Orders that forced manufacturers to produce only a fraction of their pre-war amounts. By April 1940, the limits on cloth were having a major impact with a 25% cut in wool and rayon, and a 75% cut in linen. As a consequence, manufacturers ended the production of any loss-making lines which led to calls for clothing rationing to be introduced. The prime minister, Winston Churchill, believed that the general public would not accept this change.

In June 1941 Oliver Lyttleton, the President of the Board of Trade, managed to introduce clothes rationing. Churchill, although thankful the public accepted the move, replaced Lyttleton with Hugh Dalton (a Labour member of the coalition government since 1940) a month later. Churchill was fully aware that rationing and conscription were now necessary as Britain became involved in a 'total war' spanning the globe.

Shortly after Dalton took office he appointed Metford Watkins as Director of Civilian Clothing at the Board of Trade. Watkins, aware of the high price of clothes at the time, promised to introduce cheaper clothes via 'austerity' provisions but not using standardisation. Shortly afterwards, the government announced the production of 'national footwear'. The austerity provisions governed exactly what could or could not be used in the manufacture of clothes and shoes (for example, number of buttons, pleats or pockets, height of heels, amount of lace or embroidery, no turn-ups on trousers and no double-breasted suits).

With the introduction of purchase tax in October 1941 items were taxed at different rates and necessities were designated as tax-free. This stimulated production, reduced waste and through higher taxation curtailed the production of expensive clothing.

=== Utility items ===
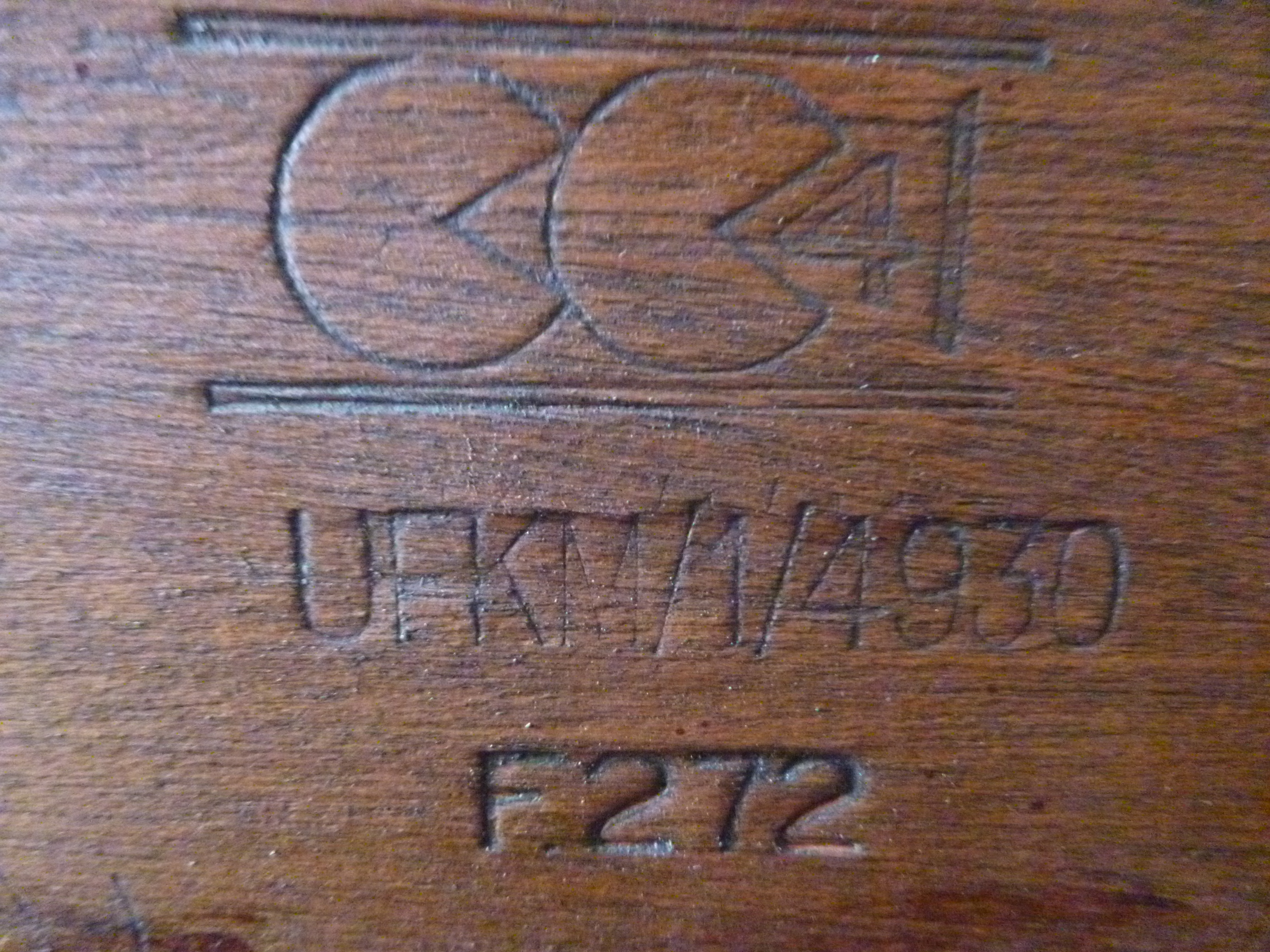
CC41 utility mark and maker's marks impressed onto the rear of a wooden bookcase.

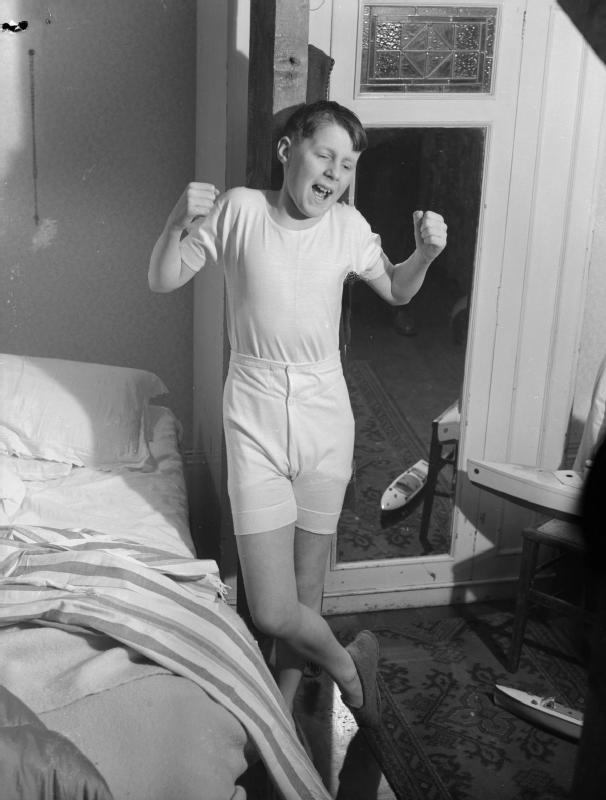
Utility underwear, photographed in 1942 by the Ministry of Information

Utility clothes were introduced and manufacturers were supplied with raw materials on a quota system. Manufacturers who agreed to increase production of utility cloth would receive a higher quota. The public bought Utility clothing as it was tax-free.

By September 1942 40 cloths had been specified (19 wool, 16 cotton, four rayon and one locknit) which all now utilised the CC41 Utility mark, designed for the Directorate of Civilian Clothing by Reginald Shipp.

The symbol was to appear on clothing, footwear and furniture and the single, identifiable mark quickly allowed the public to know if an item was tax-free or not. The symbol came to represent cheap, but reliable goods. Within the Utility footwear there were sometimes bands for quality difference. Ladies' shoes would feature the Utility mark and either W1, W2 or W3 which had a different and increasing price range.

== See also ==
- Incorporated Society of London Fashion Designers (IncSoc)
- Utility Clothing Scheme
- Utility Furniture
- Rationing in the United Kingdom
- Make-Do and Mend
- CE marking A similar modern European standard symbol
