= Utility clothing =

World War II clothing rationing in the UK

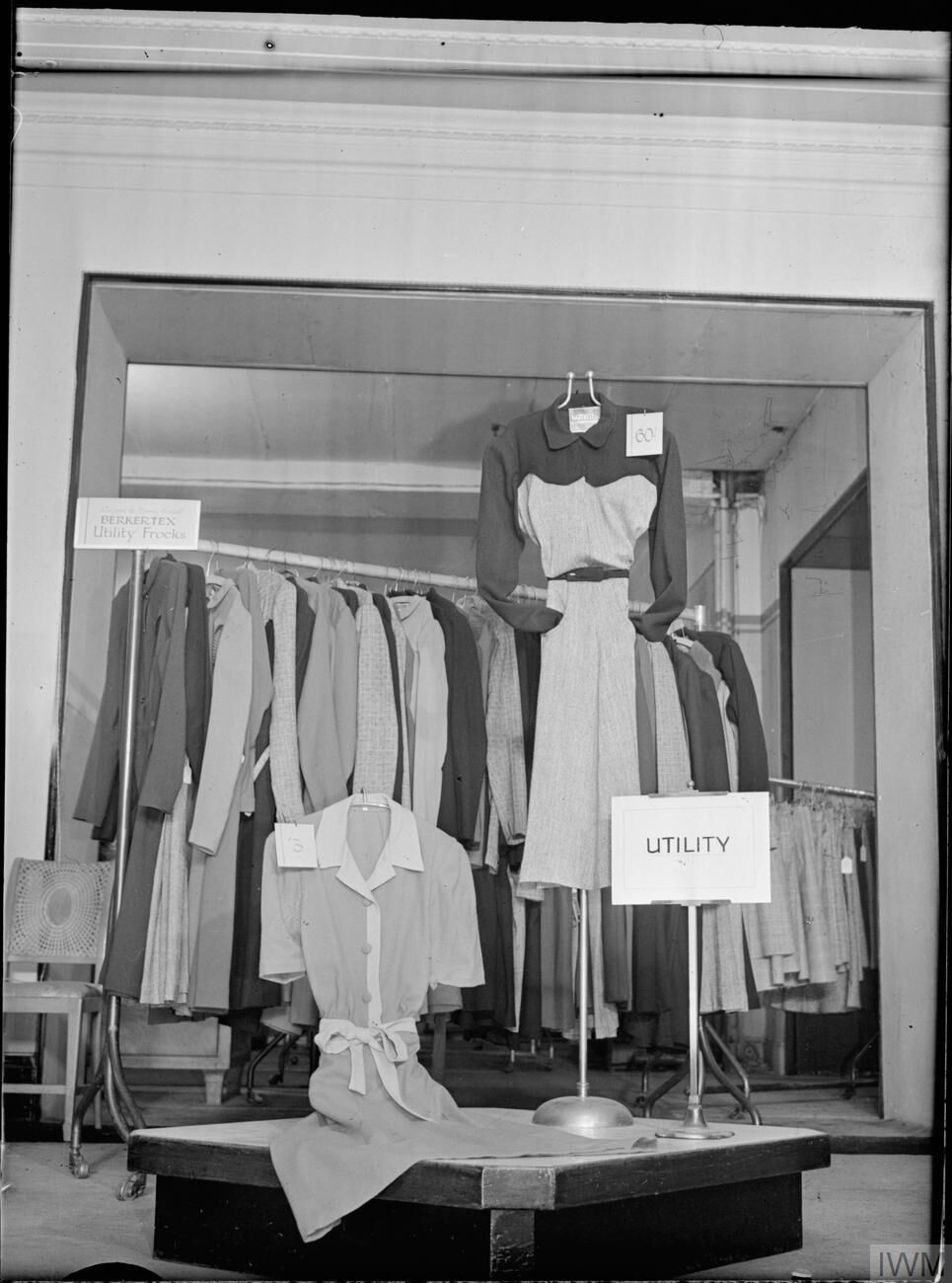
A wartime shop window displaying utility clothing designed by Norman Hartnell

The Utility Clothing Scheme was a programme introduced in the United Kingdom during the Second World War. In response to the shortage of clothing materials and labour due to wartime austerity, the Government's Board of Trade put the Utility Clothing Scheme in place in order to standardise the production, sale, and purchase of clothing in wartime. The Scheme embodied a variety of measures to ensure the availability of fabric, clothing, and shoes, which were proposed to ensure availability, no matter of the consumer’s socioeconomic circumstances.

The creation of Utility clothing meant meeting tight regulations regarding the amount of material allowed to be used in their construction, as per the restrictions of clothes rationing in this period.

Utility clothing, and later Utility furniture, was marked with the CC41 symbol, also known as the Utility mark.

In response to public misconceptions around austerity regulated specifications and the impacts these would have on the fashionability of Utility clothing, designs for a Utility collection were commissioned in 1942 from leading fashion designers, as members of the Incorporated Society of London Fashion Designers, which included Hardy Amies and Norman Hartnell, amongst others.

The Utility Clothing Scheme ran from 1941 until 1952.

== Utility clothing ==
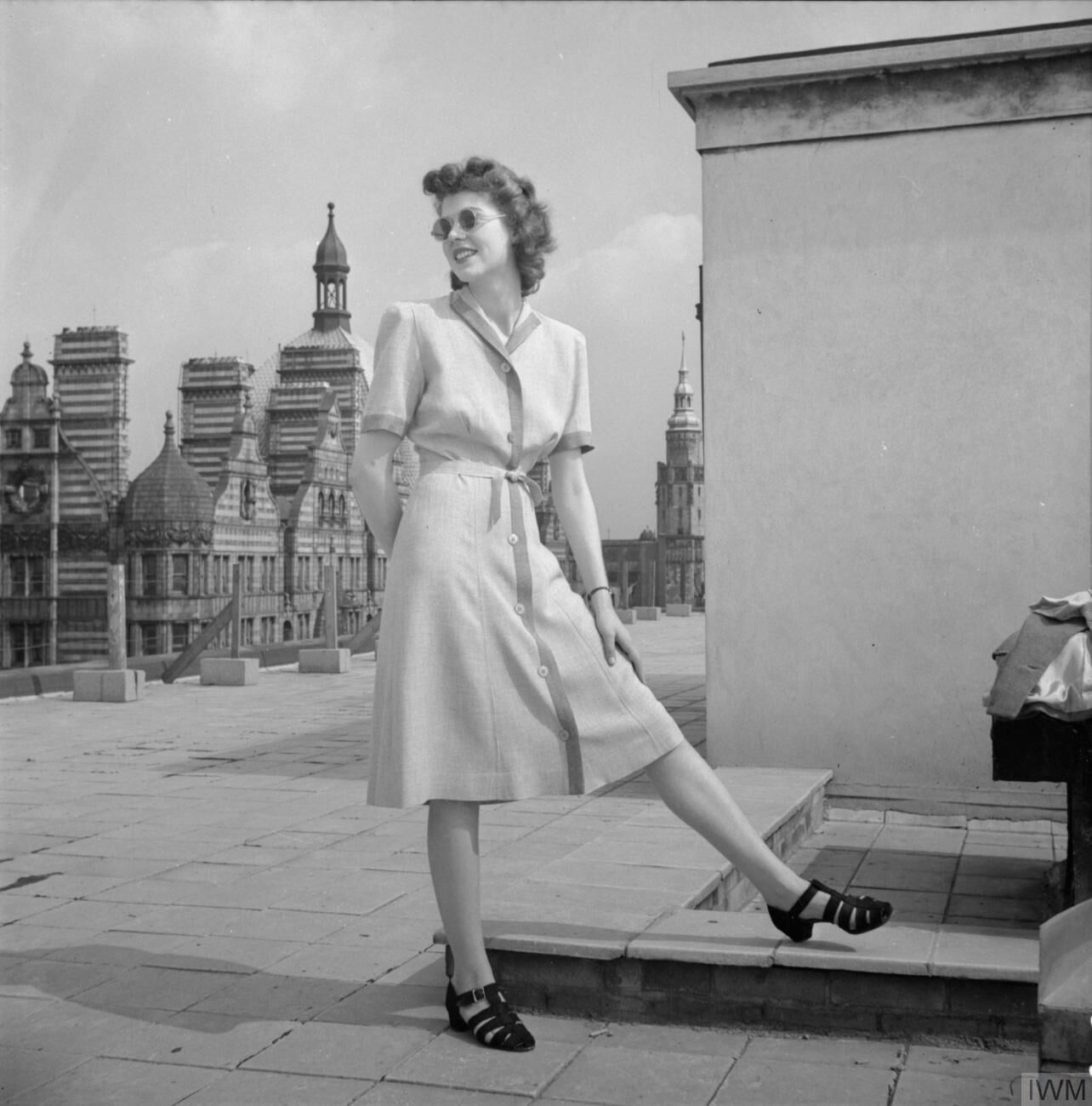
Utility two-tone 'Atrima' dress, costing 7 coupons, photographed 1943.

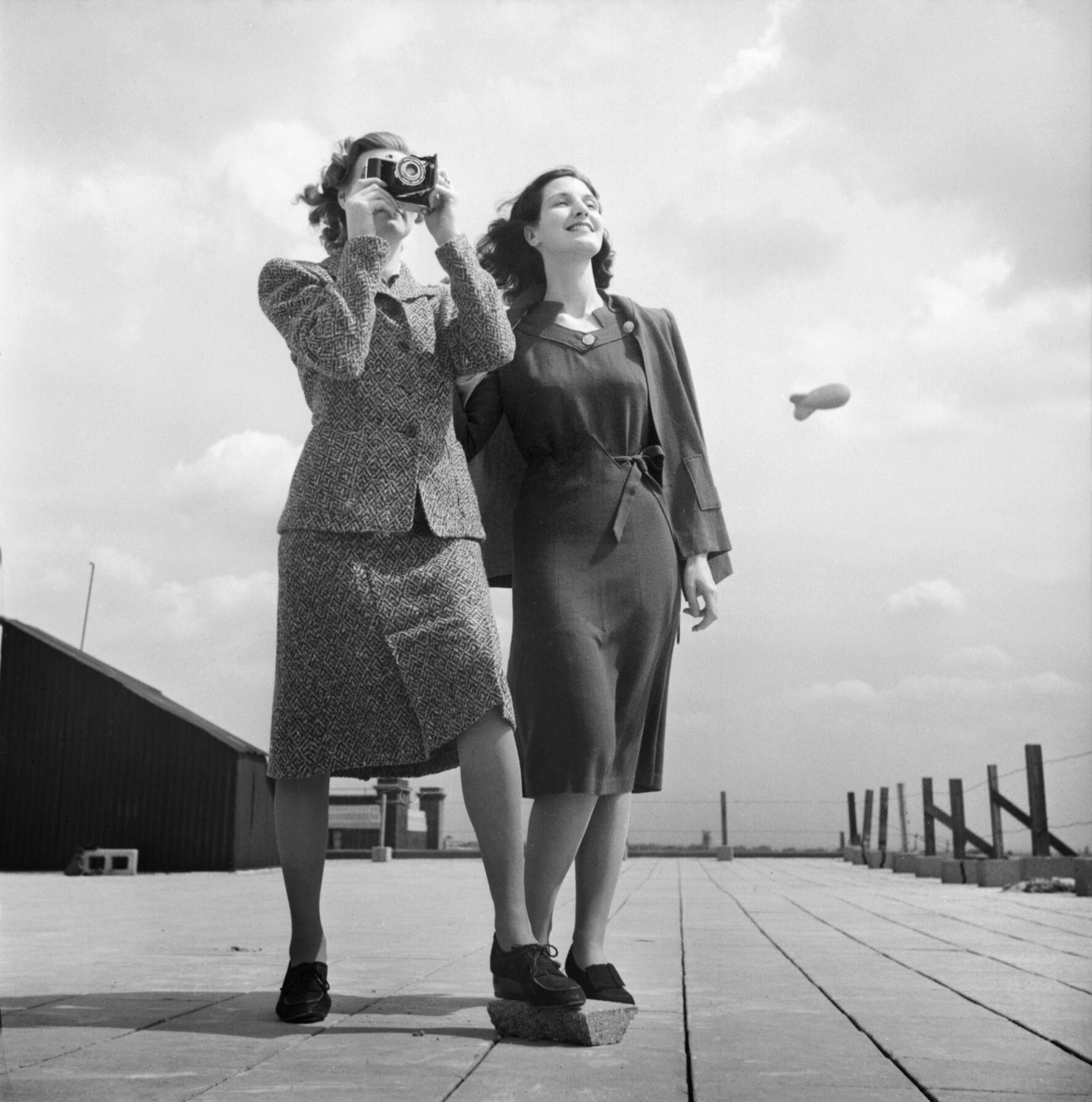
The model on the left is wearing a blue flecked tweed Utility suit from Dereta, whilst her colleague sports an emerald green woollen frock with a matching jacket, designed by Norman Hartnell, costing 22 coupons. (1943)

Raw materials and as a result clothing available for civilian consumption were limited due to the needs of the Second World War. Consequently, prices increased and some materials, such as silk, ceased to be available.

While clothes rationing was put in place in Britain on 1st June 1941, where purchasing clothing required the use of clothing coupons alongside monetary payment, there was still disparity in access to clothing. Rationing sought to limit consumption of clothing by the public, however, ‘trading-up’ by both manufacturers and civilian customers to get the most from clothing coupons had drastically increased the cost of living, with shortages in clothing being experienced across the socioeconomic landscape. In order to counteract this, the Utility Clothing Scheme was implemented.

In September 1941, the Government began to impose regulations that took into consideration the economic condition of the country, stating in the second edition of the Clothing Quiz for 1941-1942 that “Special releases of cloth are made for the production of clothing of general utility. The cloth and clothes which are made from it will bear the official mark CC41 the prices at which they can be sold will be controlled and the public will thus find on sale an adequate of clothing in the lower range of prices.”.

Through the Utility Clothing Scheme, the Government took control of supplies of raw materials for the manufacture of Utility garments. Conserving raw materials such as cotton, wool, and leather was necessary because of limited supplies. Designated manufacturers had a quota to produce Utility clothing, which was set at 85% of total clothing production. The Board of Trade allowed the 15% left for the garment industry to create non-utility clothing which met the requirements of general clothing controls and regulations.

The garment industry was encouraged to produce limited stocks in order to sustain the needs of civilians and reduce the choices available to buyers and to maintain an essential quantity of garments. Utility garments were liable to price control, to be sold at fixed prices so that civilians could afford to purchase clothes of good quality.

The Utility Clothing Scheme therefore aimed to control prices, regulate production and sale, and make durable clothing which was long-lasting, and available for sale throughout Britain.

Despite regulations and the limitation of raw materials, manufacturers and the garment industry were able to create a variety of styles and colours of Utility clothing. Though seeking to control industry production and civilian consumption, efficiency of manufacture, and the regulations which ensured this, meant a range of different garments that met the fashionable styles of the era were able to be produced as part of the Utility Clothing Scheme, through wartime and beyond.

CC41 Mark, designed by Reginald Shipp, 1941. Board of Trade.

== The 'CC41' Mark ==
The CC41 mark was to be affixed to all Utility cloth, clothing, shoes, furniture, and homewares (including home textiles) as either a label, printed, or impressed mark. The symbol, colloquially referred to as ‘cheeses’ was designed by Reginald Shipp, and is understood to represent ‘Civilian Clothing 1941’.

== Utility shoes ==
The Utility Clothing Scheme also included shoes. Utility shoes came in a wide variety of different designs. Though the materials used to make them were controlled, their styling was not standardised, apart from the restriction on heel height, which measured a maximum of 2 1/8 inch (8 cm). The heel was to be made from wood, with Utility shoes having a leather upper. Open-toed shoes were only permitted to be made after 1947.
