= Utility furniture =

World War II furniture

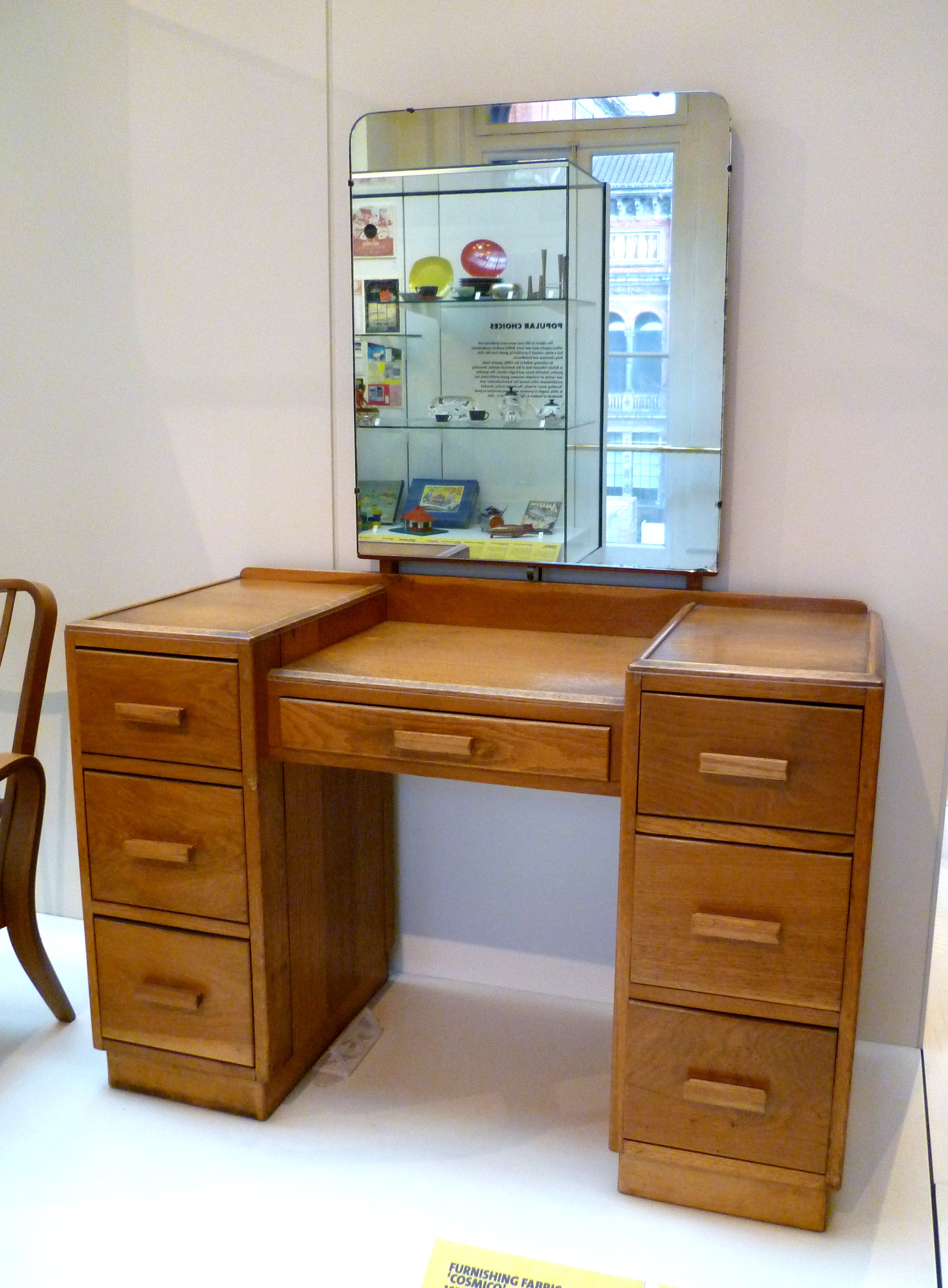
An oak dressing table designed by the Utility Design Panel c. 1943. Made by Heal & Son, 1947.

Utility furniture was furniture produced in the United Kingdom during and directly after World War II. The furniture was produced under a government scheme which was designed to cope with raw material shortages and rationing of their usage. Introduced at the end of 1942, the Utility Furniture Scheme continued into post-war austerity and lasted until its abolition in March 1949.

== Background ==
By 1941, there was a lack of timber suitable for furniture making. This, combined with losses caused by bombing and the establishment of many new households, had created a severe furniture shortage.

== The Utility Furniture Advisory Committee ==
The CC41 mark

The Utility Furniture Advisory Committee was set up in 1942 in order to assure that the available resources were used efficiently. It drew on expertise from Gordon Russell, Edwin Clinch, Herman Lebus and John Gloag. Among the committee's other members was Charles Jenkinson, a Leeds vicar and social reformer.

New furniture was rationed and was restricted to newlyweds and people who had been bombed, under the Domestic Furniture (Control of Manufacture and Supply) (No. 2) Order 1942 (SR&O 1942/2214) operative from 1 November 1942.

The same logo was used for utility furniture as for utility clothing: two capital 'C's and the figure 41.

== Utility Furniture Catalogue ==
The committee produced approved designs that were published in the Utility Furniture Catalogue of 1943. The aim was to ensure the production of strong, well-designed furniture which made efficient use of timber. The Arts and Crafts movement influenced the designs, which were considered to be simplistic due to their lack of decoration (which was contrary to the popular taste of the immediate pre-war period). Furniture based on these designs was constructed by a number of firms around the country - 589 in January 1946, increasing to 1729 in January 1949.

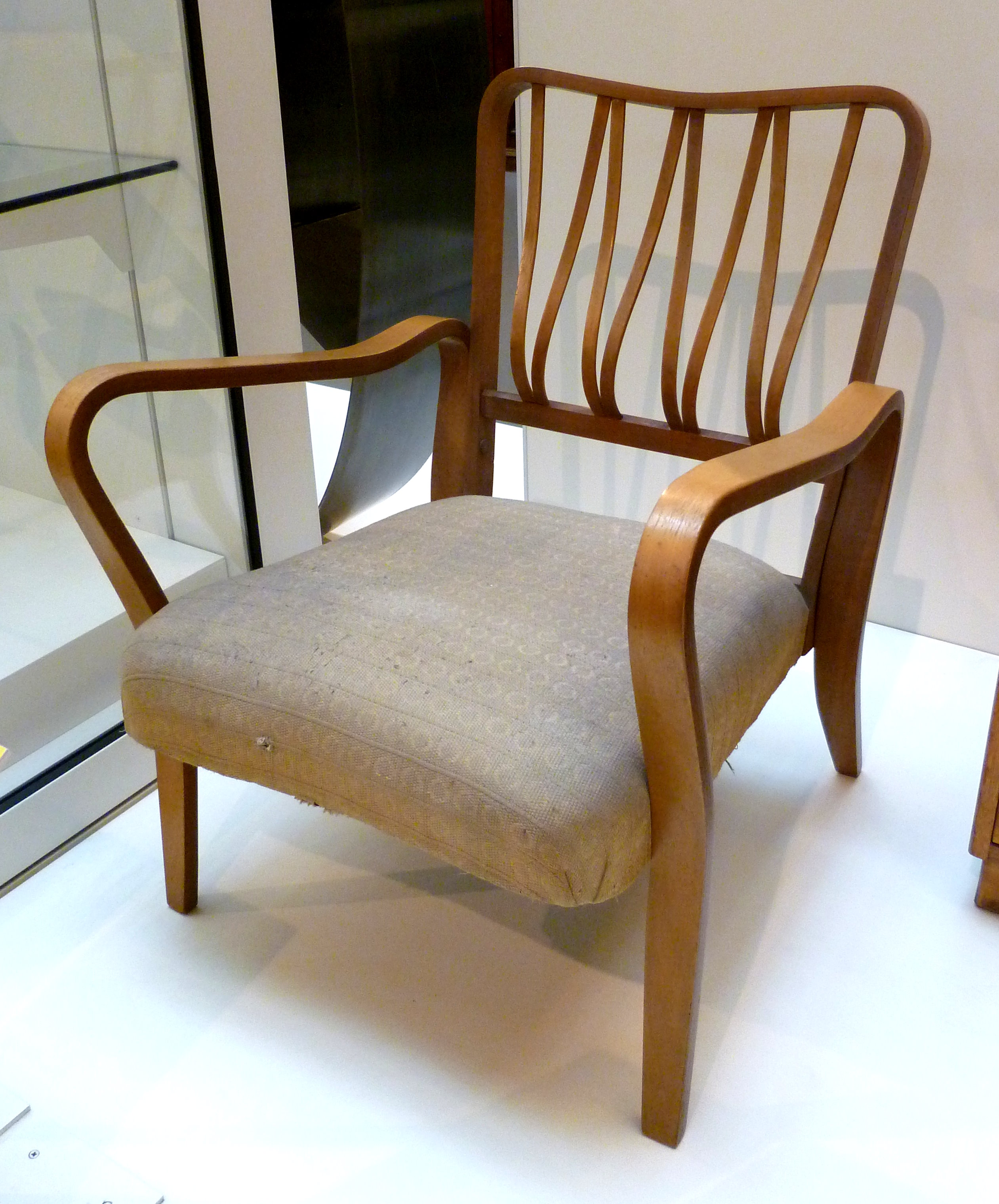
Utility chair in laminated wood, produced after design rules were relaxed in 1948 and showing the growing influence of European styles. Designed by G.A. Jenkins. 1950-52

The committee was reformed as the Utility Design Panel in 1943 with Gordon Russell as chairman. In 1946 the panel unveiled three new furniture ranges (Cotswold, Chiltern and Cockaigne), intending to display their post-war design ethos at the "Britain Can Make It" exhibition.

== Demise ==
The panel were believers in the aesthetic quality of their designs. However, demand for ornamentation arose, and there were instances of black market utility furniture with added decoration. Design rules were relaxed in 1948 and the "Diversified" range, which drew from contemporary Scandinavian designs, was announced. However, the tide of public taste was against it and the panel was wound down. The scheme was officially closed in 1952, the same year that furniture rationing ceased.

== Gallery ==
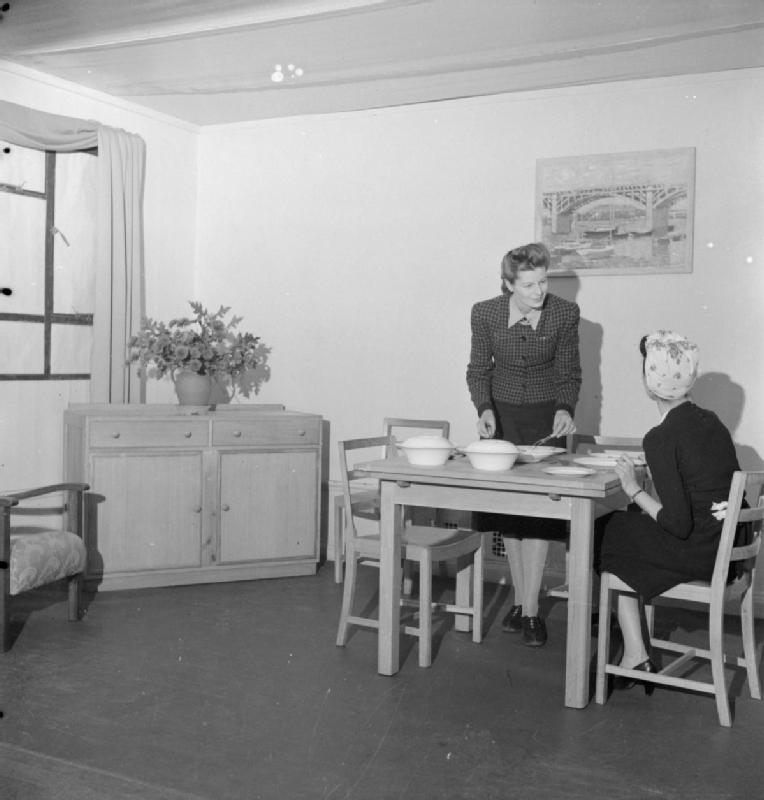
Living room furniture at the Utility Furniture Exhibition, The Building Centre, London, 1942

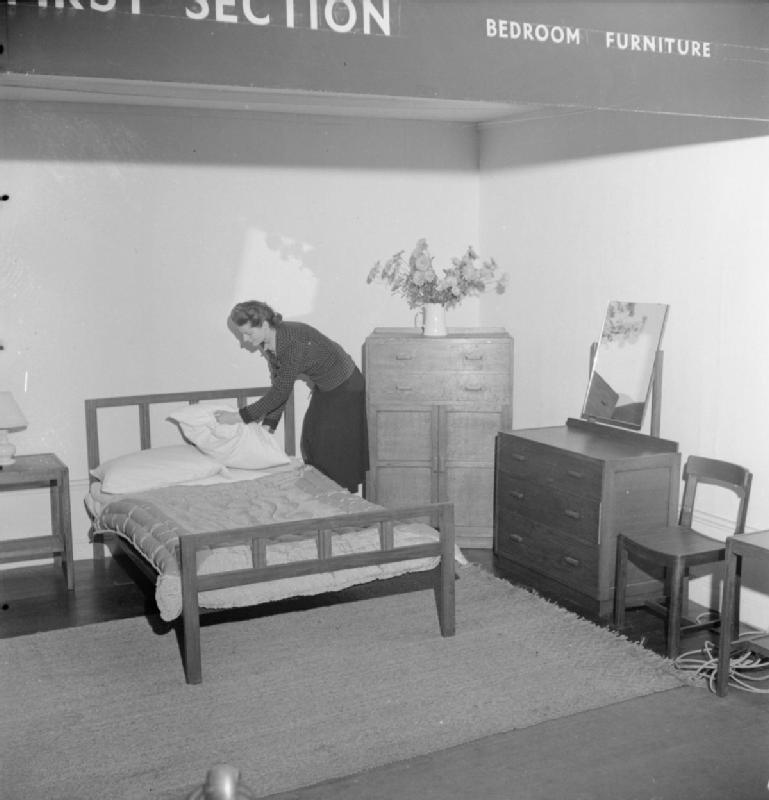
Bedroom furniture at the same exhibition

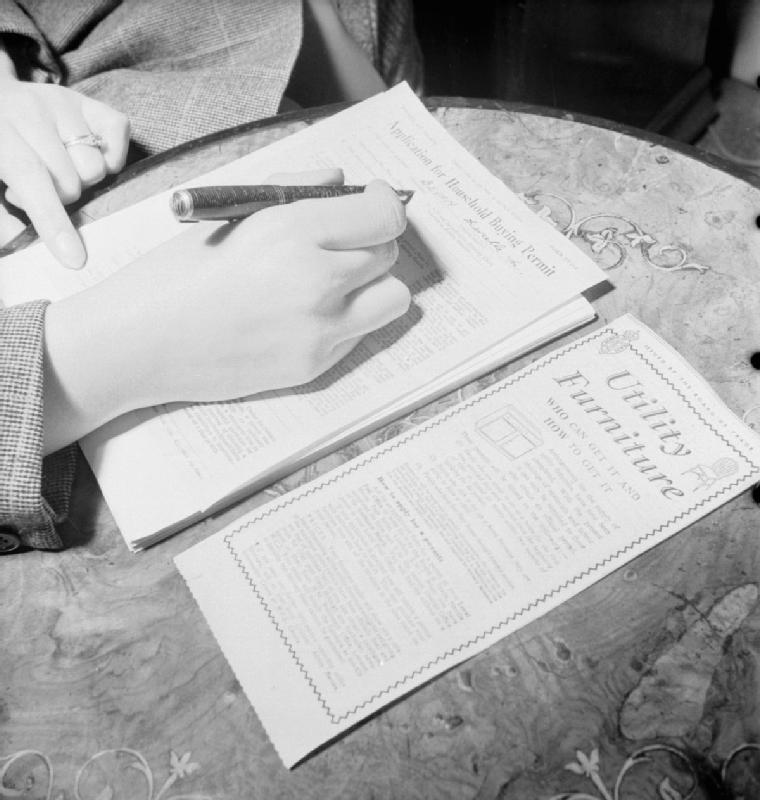
Applying for a "Household Buying Permit"

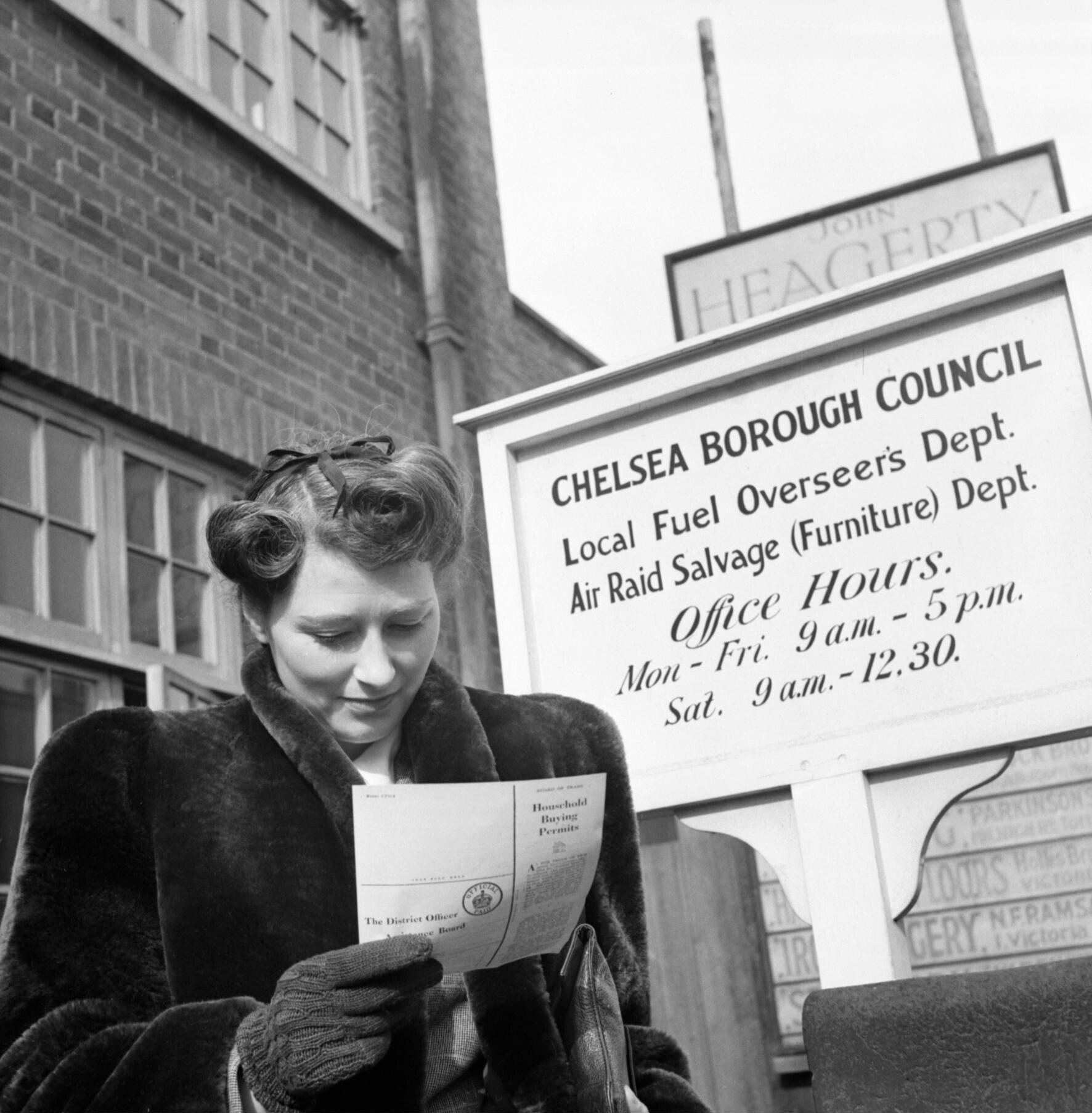
Receiving the permit.

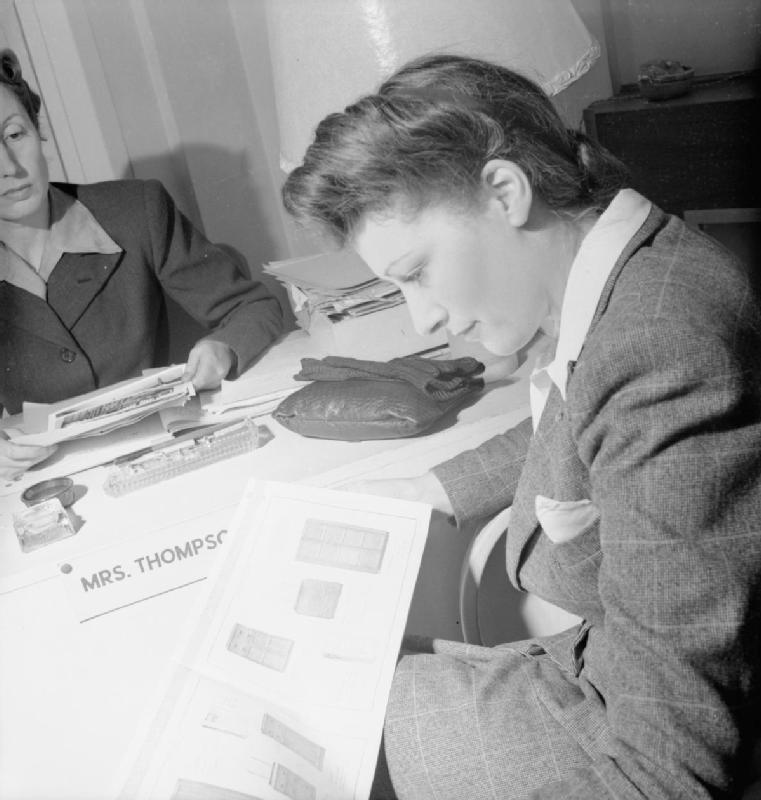
Making the purchase from a catalogue of utility furniture
