= Make Do and Mend =

UK government campaign in World War II

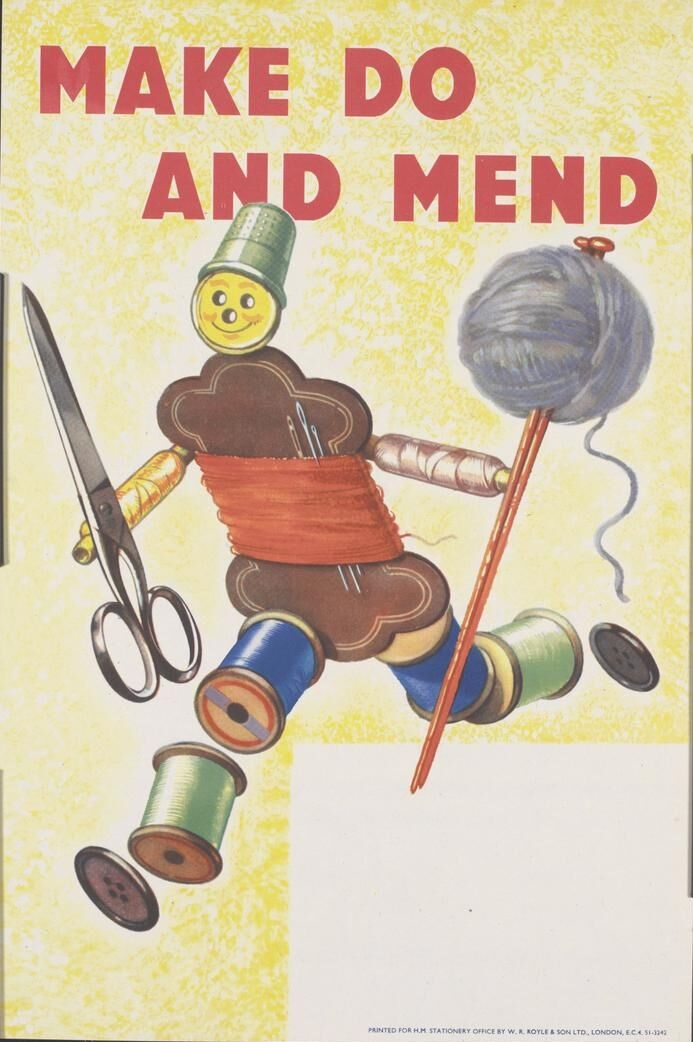
Make Do and Mend promotional advertisement, c. 1943. Imperial War Museum, Board of Trade.

Make Do and Mend was one of several campaigns introduced by the British Government (with the help of voluntary organisations) to reduce clothing consumption and save resources during the Second World War. Offering practical guidance on caring for, altering, and mending clothes, instructional pamphlets were produced. In collaboration with voluntary groups, the scheme also offered classes in fibrecraft techniques, such as dressmaking.

== Second World War ==
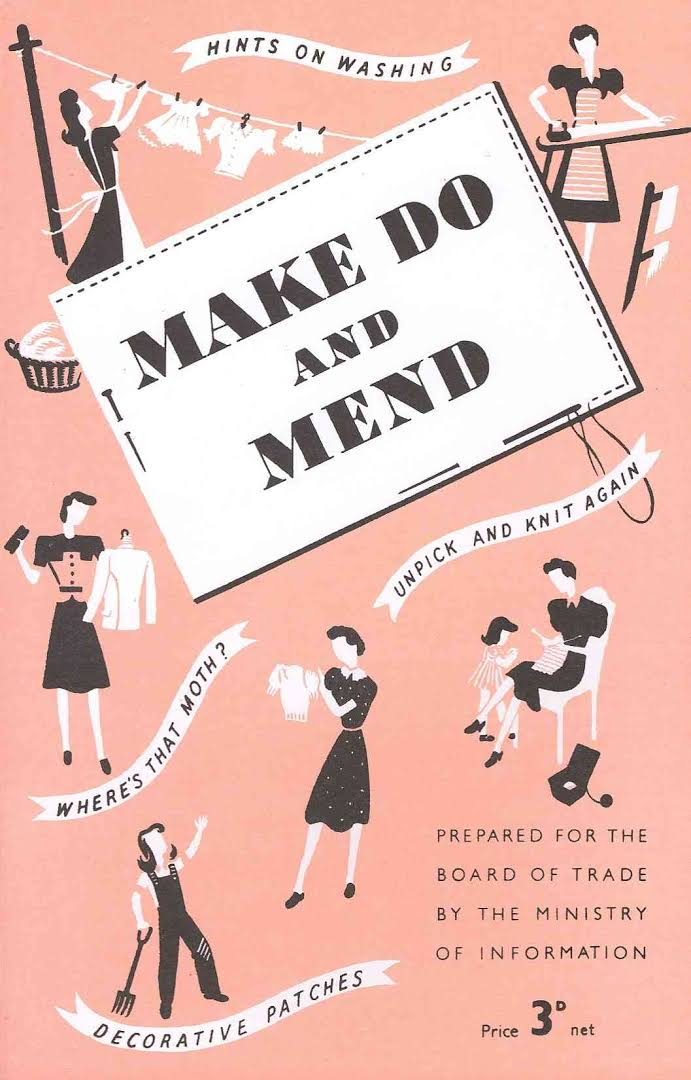
Cover of a Make-Do and Mend pamphlet (1943)

From the outset of the war in 1939, resources had quickly depleted, and people were encouraged to participate in several different means of making the most of the clothing they already had. Where voluntary groups were already providing skills and techniques in making the most of garments, the Board of Trade published the Extension of the Life of Clothing – A Preliminary Investigation on 2 July 1941, a paper which considered how to reduce civilian consumption through prolonging the use of garments.

Launched collaboratively by the Board of Trade in conjunction with voluntary groups (including the Women's Group on Public Welfare and the Women's Institute (WI), alongside the National Council of Social Services, in 1942, the Make-Do and Mend scheme set out to promote education in the techniques of dressmaking and tailoring, clothes mending, needlework, and knitting, and garment care.

With the rise in the cost-of-living index and the implementation of clothes rationing in 1941, savings could be made by creating garments through home sewing, knitting, and crochet, or through mending or altering old clothes, increasing appeal of using or learning new techniques.

Make-Do and Mend cemented frugality through thrift as an important contribution to the war effort, something which many individuals and families were already well practiced in, especially four years into the war.

== Campaign ==
In 1943, the Ministry of Information showcased a newsreel which encouraged the civilian public to repair and alter clothing, and re-use fabrics in order to save valuable resources for the war effort. Following the premiere of the short film, which depicted potential projects for the established home sewer, options for those willing to learn new dressmaking skills, and those short on coupons, Make-Do and Mend was promoted further through several government-created promotional posters, and pamphlets.

The Board of Trade produced the first Make-Do and Mend informational booklet in 1943, which contained further information regarding the scheme, and was circulated amongst the population. Such instructional pamphlets contained advice including different ways to mend, darn, and patch garments, how to protect clothing from moths, and methods of laundering, as well as instruction on re-modelling men's clothes into womenswear pieces. Advisory booklets, along with other promotional materials including films and posters which were used to inform the public of the benefits and methods of mending and making-do, often depicted Mrs Sew and Sew, a character who became very well-known as part of the campaign.

Alongside governmental initiatives, the popular press not only advertised the campaign, but produced several practical guides on caring for and mending clothes as well as dressmaking techniques, alongside articles covering the Make-Do and Mend scheme. Evening classes teaching different skills were held by the Women's Institute and the Women's Voluntary Service (WVS), which also served as a collective space to share solidarity with others. The WVS established clothing exchanges where children’s garments could be swapped once outgrown, a further way to access scarce clothing during wartime.
