= Stretcher railing =

London fences made from WWII stretchers

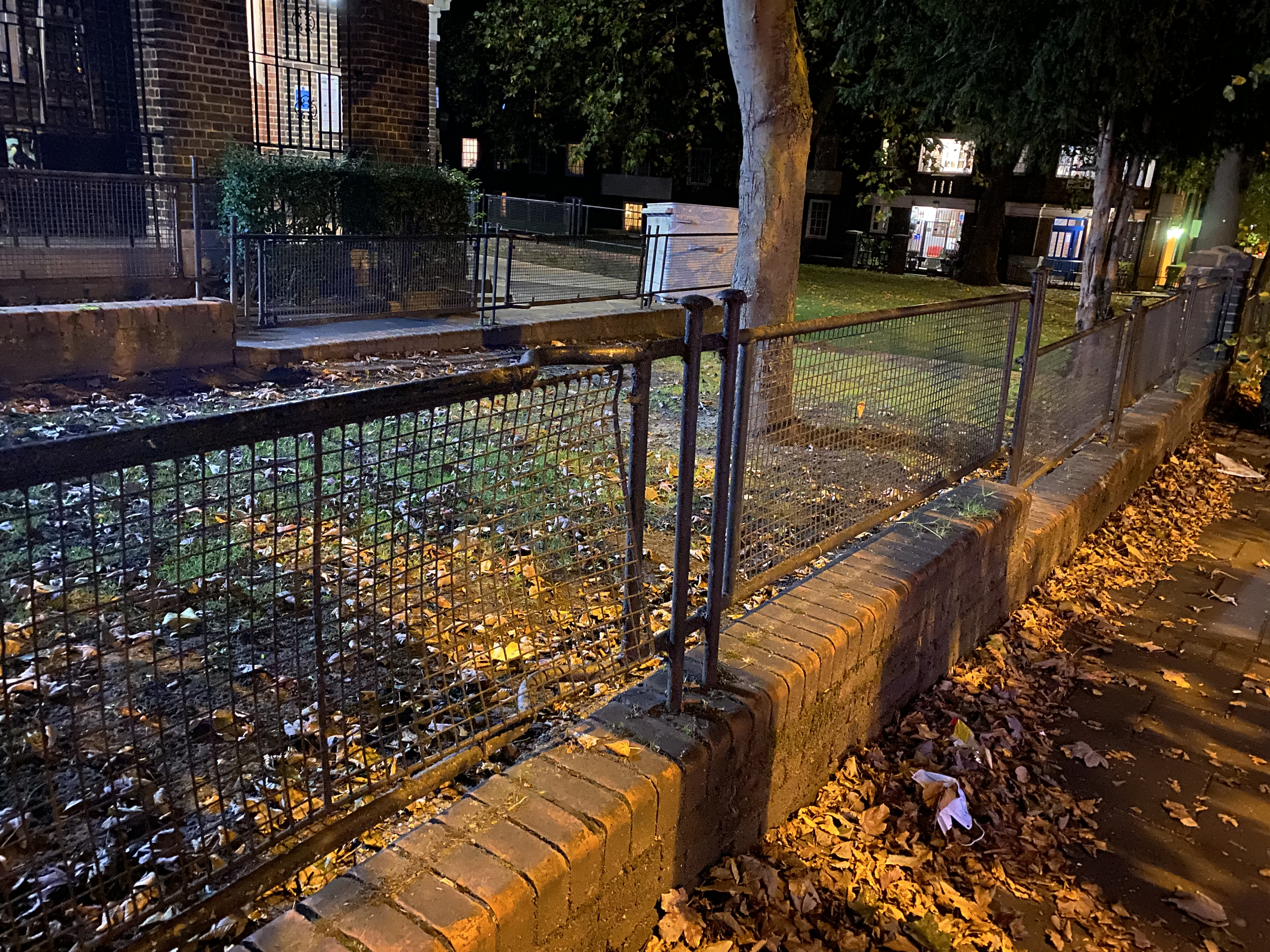
Stretcher railings in Clapham Park

Stretcher railings are railings or fences which enclose some buildings in London, England, that were made of repurposed medical stretchers left over from the Blitz during World War II. The stretchers' original form followed a purpose-built design and had numerous advantages for use during the war, and when they became unnecessary surplus after the war, their design and steel construction proved to be suitable for easy conversions to railings. The Stretcher Railing Society promotes their preservation and upkeep.

== Description ==
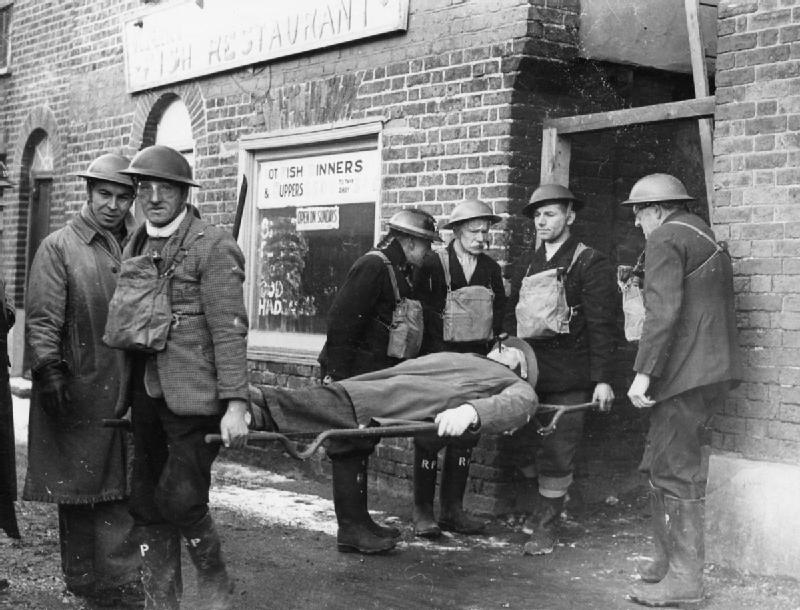
A stretcher in use during training in 1940; stretchers of this type would go on to become railings in London after the end of World War II.

In the years before the Second World War, the British government began to form the Air Raid Precautions (ARP) system in anticipation of high casualties from aerial bombing in a future war. As part of this, a large amount of equipment was procured and stockpiled in 1938–39, including gas-masks, helmets, water pumps and stretchers. The stretchers were mainly produced in manufacturing plants in Hertfordshire and the West Midlands. An initial order of 100,000 was placed in late 1938, as part of the expansion of the ARP system during the Munich Crisis. They were first issued to local authorities in January 1939. By the summer of 1939, 149,000 had been distributed and another 77,000 were on order; a total of over 600,000 would eventually be procured.

The stretchers were made to a simple design and of a single material. The design had kinks on both ends which would elevate the bed from the ground when laid flat, and allowed rescue personnel to easily pick up the stretcher. The simple all-metal design allowed for easy mass production of the stretchers, and for easy decontamination in the event of gas attacks. The bed of the stretcher is composed of a woven metal mesh. Metal was chosen as it was considered easier to clean and disinfect than the wood or fabric materials used in stretchers during World War I.

Following the end of the war, the London County Council used the then-surplus stretchers as railing fixtures. These were used to replace many of the housing-estate fences that were stripped for scrap metal during the war to aid the war effort. The stretchers were converted to railings using simple reconstructions suspending them from vertical supports. Some of the railings have since fallen into a state of disrepair due to extensive rusting.

This deterioration has led to the removal of some railings, with the first instance noted in East Dulwich. At the nearby estate of Badminton House, railings have been preserved and their owners have committed to maintaining them. The Stretcher Railing Society was created to obtain funding and to assist local councils and conservation authorities in implementing the complex restorations needed for some of the deteriorating railings. As of 2017, the society maintained a map of known stretcher railings locations.
