= St Mary's Church, Walberton =

St Mary's Church
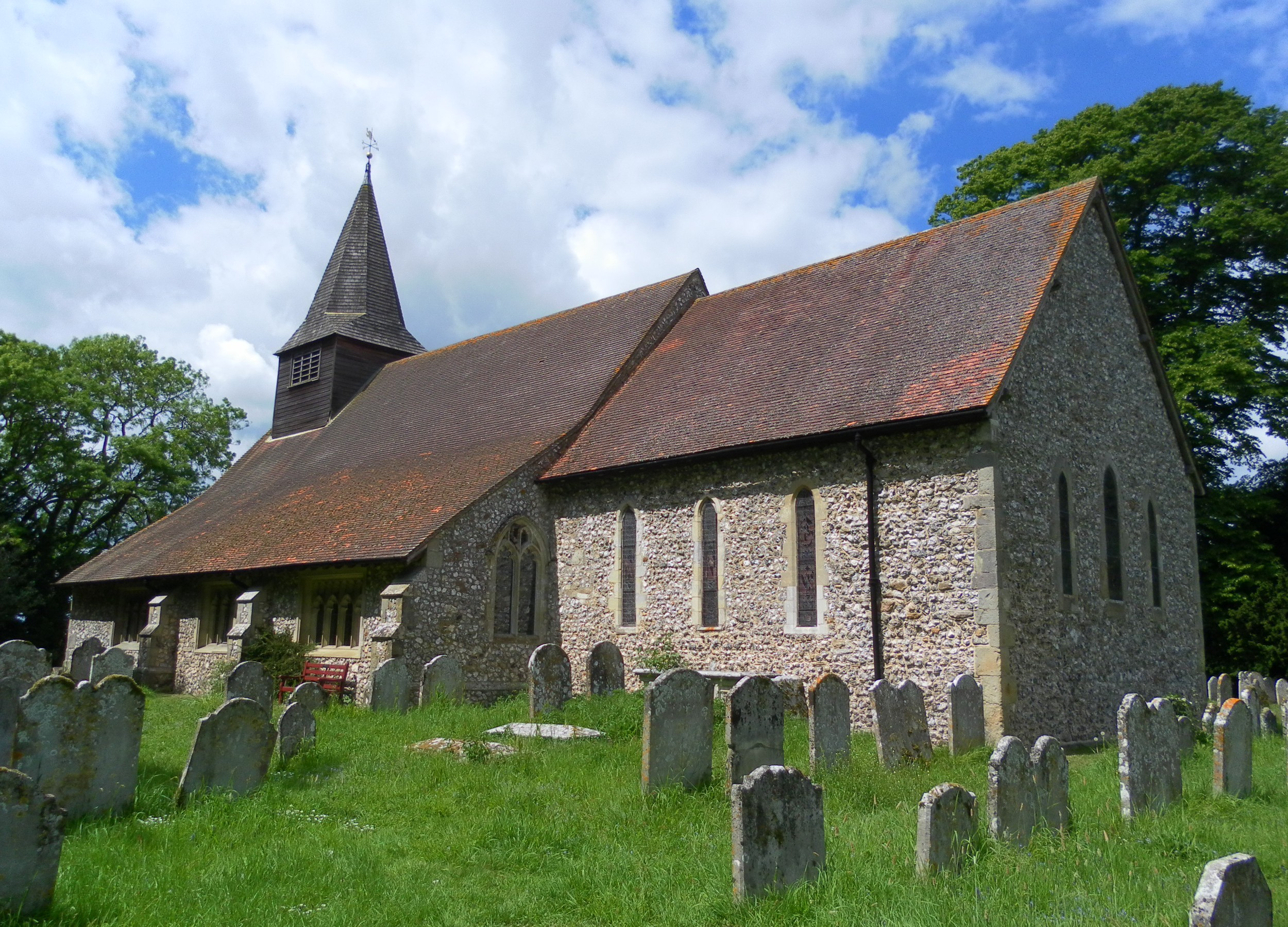
- The church from the north
- St Mary's Church
- 50.8430°N 0.6216°W
- Location: Church Lane, Walberton, West Sussex BN18 0UD
- Country: England
- Denomination: Church of England

History
- Status: Parish church
- Founded: 11th century
- Dedication: Mary, mother of Jesus

Architecture
- Functional status: Active
- Heritage designation: Grade I
- Designated: 5 June 1958
- Style: Late Saxon/Norman

Administration
- Province: Canterbury
- Diocese: Chichester
- Archdeaconry: Chichester
- Deanery: Rural Deanery of Arundel and Bognor
- Parish: Walberton

Clergy
- Vicar: Rev. Tim Ward

St Mary's Church is an Anglican church in the village of Walberton in the district of Arun, one of seven local government districts in the English county of West Sussex. Its 11th-century origins are now mostly hidden behind the results of extensive restoration work undertaken since the 18th century; but some Saxon-era fragments remain, and reused Roman building materials can still be seen in the walls. The extensive collection of 18th-century gravestones in the churchyard includes some especially macabre examples. The church is protected as a Grade I Listed building.

== History ==
The ancient parish of Walberton, which incorporated Fontwell and Avisford, covered more than 1,750 acres (710 ha) of mostly flat, gravelly land about 3 miles (4.8 km) west-southwest of Arundel and 8 miles (13 km) east of the county town of Chichester. The village of Walberton, the largest settlement, developed to the southwest of the main routes through the parish – the east–west Roman road between Brighton and Chichester (now the A27 road) and the north–south route between Madehurst and Yapton.

A church was recorded at the time of the Domesday Book in 1086; it had a permanent priest at that time, indicating its importance. It was a simple two-cell building with a nave and chancel. The west wall of the nave was built almost entirely of rubble and stones salvaged from Roman-era sites nearby, and had brick quoins. The lord of the manor granted the advowson of the church to the abbey at Lessay, France, in 1105. The abbey was associated with the priory at Boxgrove, a few miles from Walberton; the priory controlled it from about 1174 until the Dissolution of the Monasteries in 1536.

The first structural change came in the 12th century, when the east end of the nave was given arcades, each with two bays, on the north and south sides. These aisles are not homogeneous in style – almost every column and arch is a different width or height – suggesting that they were built over a long period of time, possibly even extending into the 13th century. The chancel was rebuilt in the 13th century; this work made it wider than the nave. Lancet windows were added at the same time. A porch was added on the north side at the same time; it also has lancets, and is considered a rare example.

The chancel arch was replaced in the 14th century, and a new roof was added to the nave a century later. It formed an unbroken roofline across the nave and aisles, which was possible because the church lacked a clerestory. A new west window was added at the same time, along with some other windows.

The fortunes of the church declined in the 17th and 18th centuries, and repair work had to be carried out several times, including to the roof and the south aisle (which was completely rebuilt). In the 19th century, the porch, chancel, belfry and the relatively new gallery were all altered, and the Saxon-era west entrance door was blocked. Despite all this work, yet more repairs were needed by the start of the 20th century: the nave was in danger of collapse, possibly because of the earlier work on the belfry, which had some of its supporting timberwork removed. A wholesale restoration was paid for by public donations; the architect Richard Creed was commissioned. His work, which was very extensive and eliminated almost all pre-Norman elements, has been criticised as "clumsy" and even "mulish". The nave and aisles were transformed, buttresses were added to support the west wall of the nave, the belfry was given a new supporting structure, and the chancel and nave roofs were relaid again.

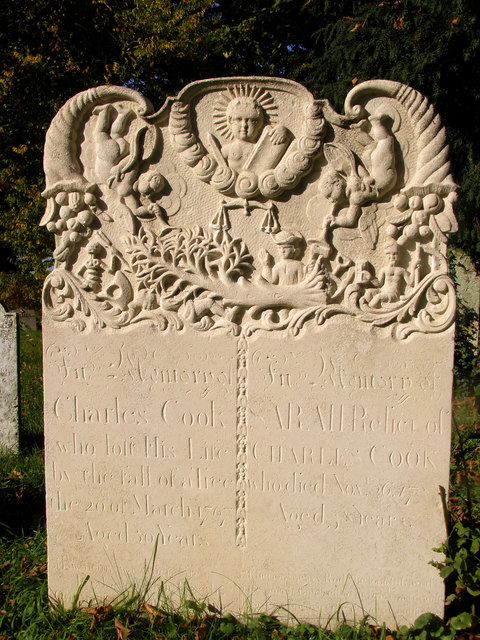
Charles Cook's macabre gravestone, describing and illustrating his fate: "In Memory of Charles Cook who lost His Life by the Fall of a Tree the 20th of March 1767 Aged 30 Years"

The churchyard is large and has a wide variety of gravestones and rarer wooden graveboards from the 18th century onwards. The carvings on gravestones of that era are often gruesome, in Sussex and elsewhere, and at Walberton there are three examples detailing their victims' causes of death. The earliest, commemorating the death in 1767 of Charles Cook, is also the most prominent because of its remarkably good condition. The white slab shows Cook crushed under a fallen tree, watched by a laughing skeleton to the left, a hat-wearing man (who is holding an axe) and Father Time (carrying his traditional scythe and hourglass) to the right, and a company of trumpet-playing angels above. Such imagery was often used on ancient gravestones because not everybody could read.

Elsewhere in the churchyard, the 1st Earl of Woolton, Minister of Food during the Second World War, is buried; the wartime vegetarian Woolton pie was named after him. He lived at Walberton House, the former manor house. A large stone coffin was found in the ground in front of the north porch in 1834; it may be of Saxon origin. It is now displayed inside the church. A lychgate was added at the churchyard entrance in the 20th century to the design of architect Philip Mainwaring Johnston.

St Mary's Church opened a mission hall in Fontwell village in 1930. This closed about 30 years later.

== Architecture ==
The church is a mostly flint structure with some ashlar and brickwork. It has a chancel, nave with north and south aisles, porch, tiled roof, and a shingled spire which sits on top of the weatherboarded belfry. Part of the nave has been converted into a vestry and other rooms. The entrance door at the west end is now the only part of the church where any pre-Norman masonry can be seen. The 13th-century chancel retains its original lancet windows, but other windows elsewhere in the church were renewed in the 15th century. Many have since been replaced. The windows in the north porch have trefoil openings at the top. The nave roof had a Saxon cross-gable until the restorations of 1903.

The belfry and its framework are typical of the Chichester area. It holds six bells, three of which were added in 1903; the others were cast between the 16th and 18th centuries but were remade as part of Creed's restoration. Other interior features include the Saxon stone coffin, which is displayed beneath the west window; an ancient stone font which was discovered in a field; a marble and iron burial vault for a local family; and a memorial stone to a previous vicar, which was carved by Sussex sculptor Eric Gill.

== Clergy ==
=== Vicars ===
1547-1551: Thomas Morlande
1551-1555: James/Jacob Crowe, served as rector of South Stoke simultaneously
1558-1570: William Skelton
1574-1613: Edmund Meadowcrofte
1613-1635: Owen/Eugene Stockton
1635: Thomas James/Jones
1662-1684: Robert Johnson, served as vicar of Binsted simultaneously
1690-1702: William Turner
1702: John Saunders
1724-1732: Phineas Phett, served as vicar of Yapton simultaneously
1732-1750: George Adams, served as vicar of Yapton simultaneously
1750-1802: Michael Dorset, served as vicar of Yapton and Rustington simultaneously, as well as a range of curacies
1802-1815: Robert Hardy, served as vicar of Yapton and Stoughton simultaneously

=== Curates ===
1755: Charles Smith, served as curate of Yapton simultaneously
1826: Charles Hardy, served as curate of Yapton simultaneously

== The church today ==
St Mary's Church was designated a Grade I Listed building on 5 June 1958.

The present ecclesiastical parish of Walberton has slightly different boundaries from the ancient parish. It lies north of the railway line between Ford and Barnham, and extends beyond the A27 road in the north. As well as Walberton village, it covers the smaller settlements of Fontwell, Avisford and Slindon Common. Administratively, the church has been part of a joint benefice with St Mary's Church in neighbouring Binsted since 1929.

== See also ==
- Grade I listed buildings in West Sussex
- List of places of worship in Arun
