= Earl of Woolton =

Earldom in the Peerage of the United Kingdom

Earldom of Woolton
- Arms of the Earl of Woolton
- Creation date: 9 January 1956
- Created by: Queen Elizabeth II
- Peerage: Peerage of the United Kingdom
- First holder: Frederick Marquis, 1st Viscount Woolton
- Present holder: Simon Marquis, 3rd Earl
- Heir apparent: None
- Remainder to: 1st Earl's heirs male of the body lawfully begotten
- Subsidiary titles: Viscount Woolton; Viscount Walberton; Baron Woolton
- Status: Extant

Earl of Woolton is a title in the Peerage of the United Kingdom. It was created on 9 January 1956 for the businessman and Conservative politician Frederick Marquis, 1st Viscount Woolton. He had already been created Baron Woolton, of Liverpool in the County Palatine of Lancaster, on 7 July 1939, and advanced as Viscount Woolton, of Liverpool in the County Palatine of Lancaster, on 2 July 1953. He received the additional title of Viscount Walberton, of Walberton in the County of Sussex, as a subsidiary title to the earldom. These titles are also in the Peerage of the United Kingdom. As of 2024, the titles are held by his grandson, the third Earl, who succeeded his father in 1969.

The 1st Earl of Woolton lived at Walberton House in Arundel, Sussex. The family seat is Auchnacree House, near Forfar in Angus.

== Earls of Woolton ==
=== Baron Woolton (1939) ===
- Frederick James Marquis, 1st Baron Woolton (1883–1964) (created Viscount Woolton in 1953)

=== Viscount Woolton (1953) ===
- Frederick James Marquis, 1st Viscount Woolton (1883–1964) (created Earl of Woolton in 1956)

=== Earls of Woolton (1956) ===
- Frederick James Marquis, 1st Earl of Woolton (1883–1964)
- Roger David Marquis, 2nd Earl of Woolton (1922–1969)
- Simon Frederick Marquis, 3rd Earl of Woolton (born 1958)

There is no heir to the earldom.

== Arms ==
Coat of arms of Earl of Woolton
Arms of the Earl of Woolton	Coronet That of an Earl Crest Suspended from and between the Antlers of a stag a Stirrup and Leather Proper Escutcheon Sable on a Bend engrailed between two Garbs Or a Rose Gules barbed and seeded Proper between two Lions rampant of the Field Supporters On either side a Lion rampant Or gorged with a Riband Azure pendent therefrom by a Chain also Or an Escutcheon Azure charged with a Liver Bird Argent Motto Fortitudine Virtute Dabitur ("By fortitude and courage it shall be given")
