= Walberton =

Village and parish in West Sussex, England

Coordinates: 50.84471°N 0.6198°W

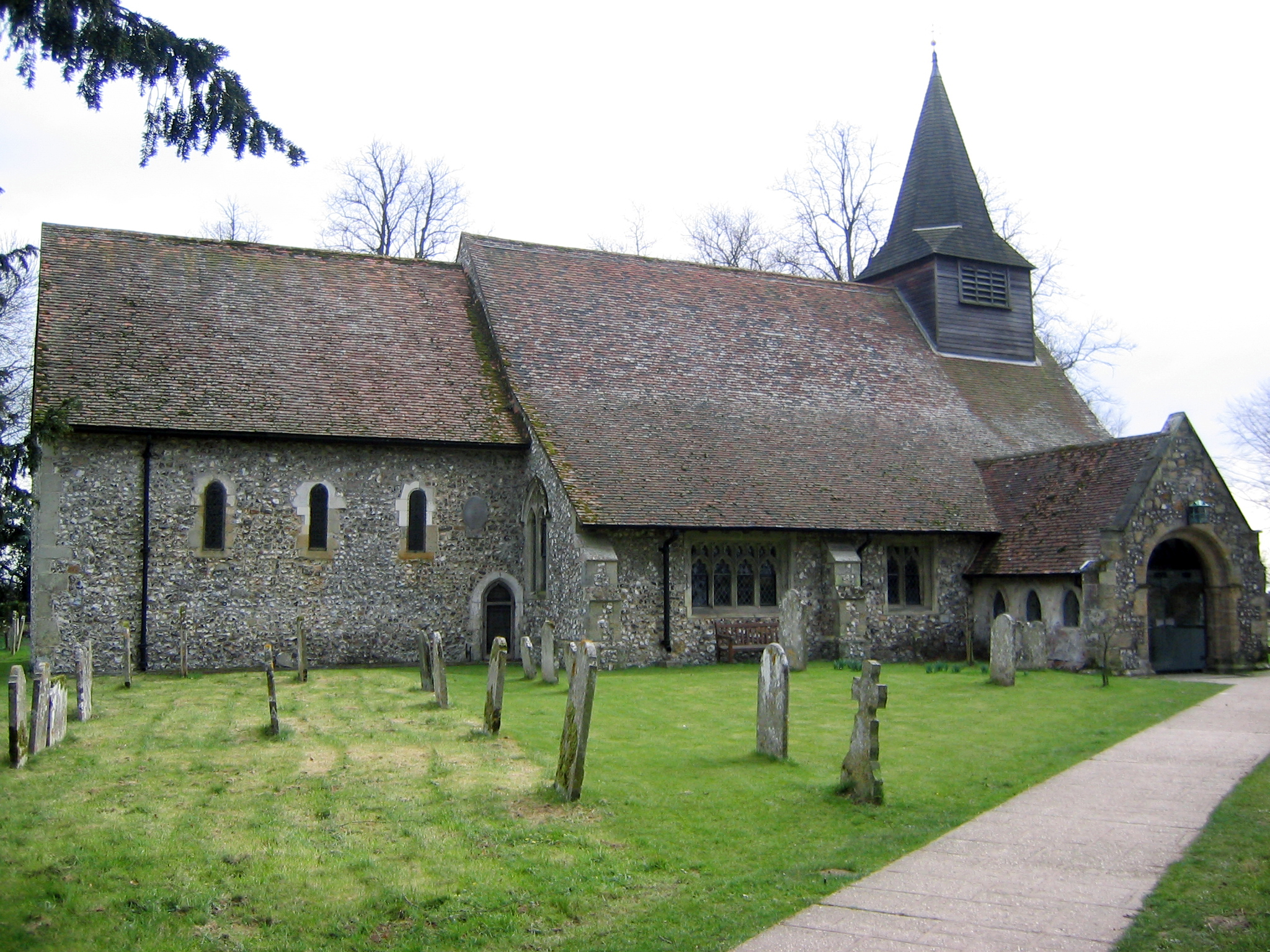
- St Mary's Church, Walberton

- Location within West Sussex
- Area: 10.44 km^{2} (4.03 sq mi)
- Population: 2,174 (Civil Parish.2011)
  - Density: 208/km^{2} (540/sq mi)
- OS grid reference: SU972059
  - London: 50 miles (80 km) NNE
- Civil parish: Walberton
- District: Arun
- Shire county: West Sussex
- Region: South East
- Country: England
- Sovereign state: United Kingdom
- Post town: ARUNDEL
- Postcode district: BN18
- Dialling code: 01243
- Police: Sussex
- Fire: West Sussex
- Ambulance: South East Coast
- UK Parliament: Arundel and South Downs

Walberton is a village and civil parish in the Arun District of West Sussex, England, 5 miles (8 km) north-west of Littlehampton, and south of the A27 road. The land rises from 33–115 feet (10–35 m) above sea level, a quarter of the height of Nore Hill, the nearest foothill of the South Downs, which is to the north of the parish. The parish includes the smaller village of Binsted to the east and the larger neighbourhood of Fontwell, less than two-thirds of a mile (1 km) to the north-west. Walberton has a medieval church next to its clustered centre. Binsted's medieval church retains an original setting of village houses dispersed over farm fields.

== History ==
The two churchyards have yielded archaeological evidence that there was settlement during the Bronze Age, about 3,500 years ago. Some fragments of brick and tile were discovered at Binsted during excavations in 1992.

Walberton is listed in the Domesday Book of 1086 under the Hundred of Binsted (also called Avisford; called Binsted in 1086 but had its later name by 1166). It comprised 22 villagers, 17 cottagers and six slaves, plough land, woodland and meadows, as well as a church. Binsted itself was also listed as having 8 households.

The timber lychgate to the churchyard was installed as a war memorial in 1920.

== Governance ==
The electoral ward named Walberton stretches north-east to Madehurst, with a total population taken at the 2011 census of 2,889.

== Natural history ==
Part of Binsted is within the South Downs National Park. The whole of Binsted's countryside was originally assessed by the Countryside Agency as meeting the criteria for inclusion.

The space above the chancel of Walberton Church contains a colony of pipistrelle bats, which is counted annually. A figure of 300 has been recorded.

== Schooling ==
The local school is Walberton and Binsted CE Primary School. The present building is just over ten years old. There are seven classrooms, each of which has its own piece of garden. The school also offers ample play space, a music room and computer facilities.

The school was graded Good by Ofsted in all the main respects at its last inspection in May 2017. There were 208 pupils at that time and 202 at a Statutory Inspection of Anglican and Methodist Schools (SIAMS) in March 2020, which concentrated on religious education.

== Amenities ==
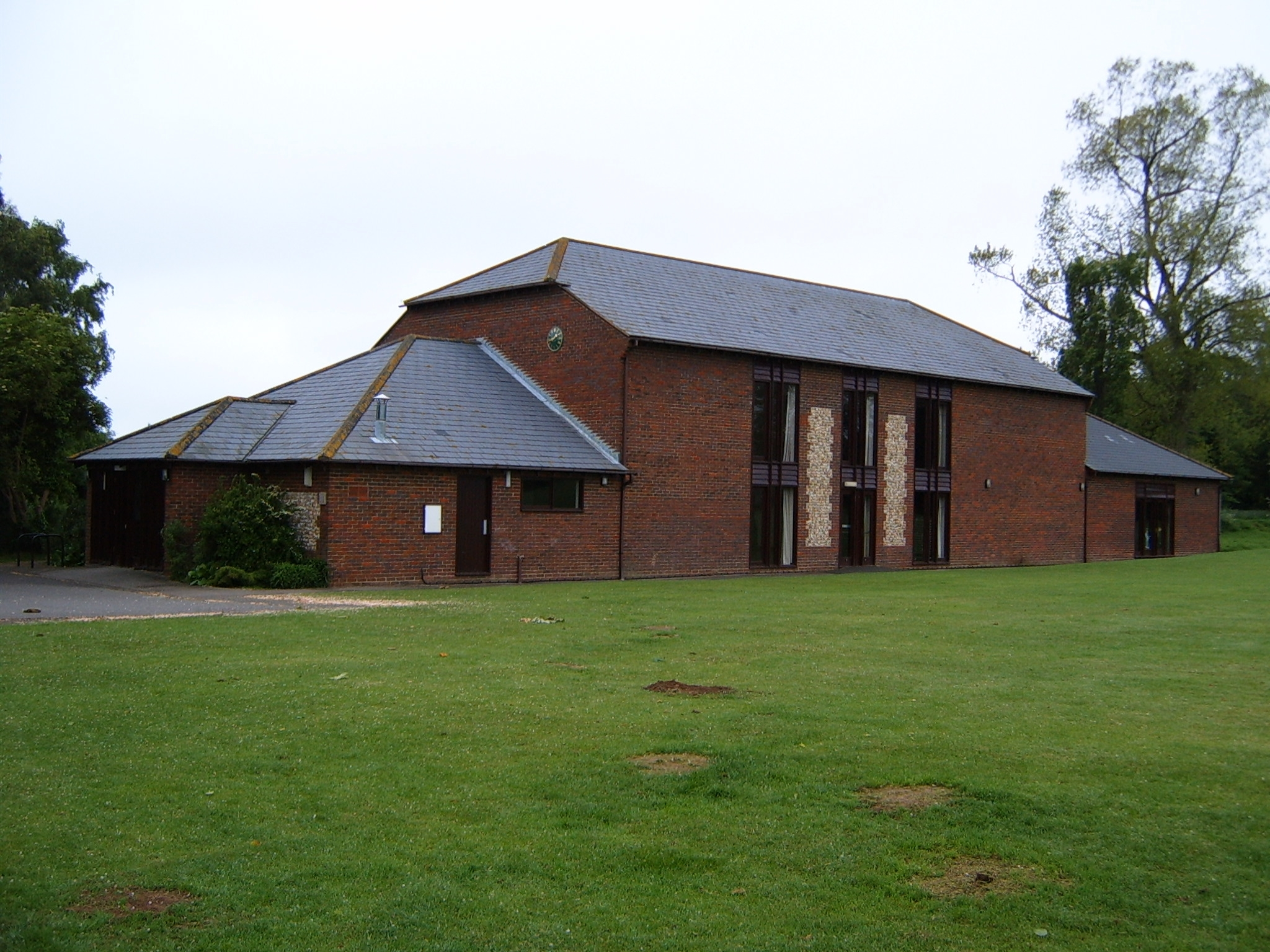
Walberton Village Hall

Walberton's The Holly Tree is recorded as a public house from 1845 and received its present name in 1867. Towards the end of the village, there is a small duck pond. There are a few shops close to the modern village hall.

Binsted has a pub, the Black Horse and a Norman church built in 1140 AD by the monks of Tortington Priory to the immediate east. Roman and medieval pottery and tile kilns have been excavated there. Binsted also has a traditional summer festival, Strawberry Fair, where locally grown produce is sold for charity.

=== Churches ===
St Mary's Church in Walberton was recorded in the Domesday Book of 1086, which it considerably predates, as evidenced by its Saxon font and Roman-era west wall.

In 1846, a small group of parishioners left St Mary's to form a Baptist church. Its present flint building dates from 1886. Since 1973, it has been affiliated to the Fellowship of Independent Evangelical Churches.

Both St Mary's and Walberton Baptist Church normally have services every Sunday and a range of mid-week activities.

== Notable people ==
- Sir William Anson (1843–1914), jurist, academic and politician, was born in Walberton.
- Frederick Marquis, 1st Earl of Woolton (1883–1964), businessman and government minister, is buried in Walberton churchyard.
- Rosemary Sutcliff (1920–1992), children's writer, spent the latter part of her life in Walberton.
- The Avisford Park Hotel, with its golf course between Walberton and Binsted, was formerly Avisford Roman Catholic Preparatory School for Boys (1928–73), where BBC journalist Edward Stourton (born 1957) was head boy and Robert Nairac (1948–1977), an army officer abducted and murdered in Northern Ireland, spent a year teaching before university in the late 1960s.
- Lt Gen Thomas Reynell (1777-1848) is buried in the churchyard.
