= Ministry of Reconstruction =

Defunct United Kingdom government department

The Ministry of Reconstruction was a department of the United Kingdom government which existed after both World War I and World War II in order to provide for the needs of the population in the post war years.

== World War I ==
The Ministry of Reconstruction was originally established by the Lloyd George government of 1917 and covered a wide range of political and social areas, including:

- administrative reform
- the role of women in society
- employment
- industrial relations
- housing

It was led by Christopher Addison and was "charged with overseeing the task of rebuilding 'the national life on a better and more durable foundation' once the Great War was over.

From 1918 the Advisory Council to the Ministry of Reconstruction was chaired by Sir Henry Birchenough.

The Ministry addressed the issues of prolonged strike action by workers, many of whom were demobilised troops. 2.4 million British workers were involved in strike action in 1919, in what the government perceived as a threat to the development of the economy.

== World War II ==
The second Ministry of Reconstruction was established in November 1943 and abolished in July 1945 and for its duration was under the political leadership of Lord Woolton. Its permanent secretary was Norman Brook. It replaced the Reconstruction Secretariat which had been the political responsibility of Arthur Greenwood, minister without portfolio in the War Cabinet. Between 1940 and 1942 the Secretariat was headed by Sir George Chrystal, formerly permanent secretary at the Ministry of Health, and subsequently by Alfred Hurst, formerly undersecretary at the Ministry of Mines.

== See also ==
- Minister of Reconstruction
