= Simon Marquis, 3rd Earl of Woolton =

British peer and businessman (born 1958)

The Right Honourable The Earl of Woolton

Member of the House of Lords
- Lord Temporal
- as a hereditary peer 7 January 1969 (Note: The 3rd Earl was only eligible to take his seat in the House of Lords once he reached 21 years of age on 24 May 1979.) – 11 November 1999
- Preceded by: The 2nd Earl of Woolton
- Succeeded by: Seat abolished (Note: Pursuant to the House of Lords Act 1999.)

Personal details
- Born: Simon Frederick Marquis; 24 May 1958 (age 68)
- Spouses: Hon. Sophie Birdwood (m. 1987; div. 1997) Carol Chapman née Davidson (m. 1999)
- Children: 3 daughters
- Parent(s): Roger Marquis, 2nd Earl of Woolton; Josephine Gordon-Cumming
- Education: Eton College; University of St Andrews (MA)
- Occupation: Businessman, peer

Simon Frederick Marquis, 3rd Earl of Woolton (born 24 May 1958), styled Viscount Walberton between 1964 and 1969, is a British hereditary peer and businessman.

== Early life and education ==
The only son of Roger Marquis, 2nd Earl of Woolton, and his second wife (Cecily) Josephine Gordon-Cumming (1925–2012), later Countess Lloyd-George of Dwyfor, elder daughter of Sir Alexander Penrose Gordon-Cumming, 5th Baronet. He succeeded to the earldom and subsidiary titles at the age of 10 upon the death of his father in 1969.

After attending Eton, he went up to read Economics and Modern History at the University of St Andrews, graduating MA in 1981.

== Career ==
Lord Woolton began his career at S.G. Warburg & Co. Ltd. in 1982. He was a director of New Boathouse Capital and Chief Financial Officer of Quayle Munro. Since 2018, he works for Houlihan Lokey UK as Corporate Chief Operating Officer.

Woolton was introduced to the House of Lords in 1979 (21 being the minimum age at which a peer can take their seat) where he sat until the House of Lords Act 1999, which removed hereditary peers' automatic right to a seat in Parliament.

A Freeman of the City of London, Lord Woolton served as Master of the Worshipful Company of Skinners for 2024/25.

== Marriages and children ==
Woolton married the Hon. Sophie Birdwood, only child of Mark Birdwood, 3rd Baron Birdwood, in 1987. The Earl and Countess of Woolton had three daughters. Woolton and his first wife were divorced on 13 May 1997. He married secondly, on 28 October 1999, Mrs (Mary) Carol Chapman (née Davidson), who has two daughters from a previous marriage.

As Woolton has no sons and as there are no other surviving male-line descendants of the first earl, the earldom and its subsidiary titles will become extinct upon the present earl's death.

Coat of arms of Simon Marquis, 3rd Earl of Woolton
Arms of the Earl of Woolton	Coronet That of an Earl Crest Suspended from and between the Antlers of a stag a Stirrup and Leather Proper Escutcheon Sable on a Bend engrailed between two Garbs Or a Rose Gules barbed and seeded Proper between two Lions rampant of the Field Supporters On either side a Lion rampant Or gorged with a Riband Azure pendent therefrom by a Chain also Or an Escutcheon Azure charged with a Liver Bird Argent Motto Fortitudine Virtute Dabitur (By fortitude and courage it shall be given) Other elements As Master Skinner, Lord Woolton can impale the Skinners' arms (dexter) with his family arms (sinister)

== Notes ==
Peerage of the United Kingdom
Preceded by Roger Marquis; 2nd Earl	Earl of Woolton; 1969–present Member of the House of Lords (1969–1999)	Incumbent; Heir: none
Preceded by Roger Marquis; 2nd Earl	Viscount Woolton; 1969–present	Incumbent; Heir: none
Preceded by Roger Marquis; 2nd Earl	Baron Woolton; 1969–present	Incumbent; Heir: none
