= Minister of Reconstruction =

The Minister of Reconstruction was a British government post that briefly existed during the latter stages of the Second World War, charged with planning for the post-war period. A succession of government committees had failed to make much progress with the problems arising out of reconstruction and so in 1943 Winston Churchill took the bold step of appointing a single minister as a member of the War Cabinet.

== Minister of Reconstruction (1917–1919) ==
Name	Term of office		Political party	Government
Christopher Addison; MP for Hoxton before 1918; MP for Shoreditch after 1918	17 July 1917	10 January 1919	Liberal	Lloyd George
Auckland Geddes; MP for Basingstoke	10 January 1919	August 1919	Conservative	Lloyd George

== Minister of Reconstruction (1943–1945) ==
Colour key (for political parties):
Conservative Independent

Name	Portrait	Term of office		Political party	Government
Frederick Marquis; 1st Baron Woolton		11 November 1943	23 May 1945	Independent	Churchill War

== See also ==
- Ministry of Reconstruction
