= Roger Marquis, 2nd Earl of Woolton =

British earl

The Right Honourable The Earl of Woolton

Member of the House of Lords
- Lord Temporal
- In office 1964 – 7 January 1969 as a hereditary peer
- Preceded by: The 1st Earl of Woolton
- Succeeded by: The 3rd Earl of Woolton

Personal details
- Born: Roger David Marquis; 22 July 1922
- Died: 7 January 1969 (aged 46)
- Spouses: Hon. Lucia Edith Lawson (m. 1946; div. 1953) Cecily Josephine Gordon-Cumming (m. 1957–1969)
- Children: 2
- Parent(s): Frederick Marquis, 1st Earl of Woolton; Maud Smith
- Occupation: Peer

Roger David Marquis, 2nd Earl of Woolton (16 July 1922 – 7 January 1969), styled Viscount Walberton from 1956 to 1964, and the Hon. Roger Marquis from 1939 to 1956, was a British hereditary peer.

== Early life and education ==
Woolton was the son of Frederick Marquis, 1st Earl of Woolton, and his wife Maud (née Smith). He was educated at Rugby School and Trinity College, Cambridge, from which he graduated in 1943 with a BA.

He gained the rank of Flight Lieutenant in the Royal Air Force Volunteer Reserve during the Second World War.

== Marriages and children ==
Woolton married the Hon. Lucia Edith Lawson, daughter of Edward Lawson, 4th Baron Burnham, on 9 November 1946. They had no children and were divorced in 1953.

In 1957 he married (Cecily) Josephine Gordon-Cumming (1925–2012), elder daughter of Major Sir Alexander Penrose Gordon-Cumming of Altyre, 5th Bt. They had two children:

- Simon Frederick Marquis, 3rd Earl of Woolton (born 24 May 1958)
- Lady Alexandra Susan Marquis (born 12 January 1961)

== Death ==
Lord Woolton died in 1969 at the age of 46. He was succeeded in the earldom and other titles by his only son, Simon.

After her husband's death, Lady Woolton married secondly on 22 September 1969 John Archibald Harford Williamson, 3rd Baron Forres. They were divorced in 1974. In 1982 (as his second wife) she married thirdly Owen Lloyd George, 3rd Earl Lloyd-George of Dwyfor (1924–2010).

== Arms ==
Coat of arms of Roger Marquis, 2nd Earl of Woolton
Arms of the Earl of Woolton	Coronet A Coronet of an Earl Crest Suspended from and between the Antlers of a stag a Stirrup and Leather proper Escutcheon Sable on a Bend engrailed between two Garbs Or a Rose Gules barbed and seeded proper between two Lions rampant of the field Supporters On either side a Lion rampant Or gorged with a Riband Azure pendent therefrom by a Chain also Or an Escutcheon Azure charged with a Liver Bird Argent Motto Fortitudine Virtute Dabitur ("By fortitude and courage it shall be given")

Peerage of the United Kingdom
Preceded by Frederick Marquis	Earl of Woolton; 1964–1969	Succeeded by Simon Marquis
Preceded by Frederick Marquis	Viscount Woolton; 1964–1969	Succeeded by Simon Marquis
Preceded by Frederick Marquis	Baron Woolton; 1964–1969	Succeeded by Simon Marquis
