= Worshipful Company of Skinners =

Livery company of the City of London

Coordinates: 51.51111°N 0.09119°W

Skinners' Company
- Skinners' arms: Ermine, on a Chief Gules three Crowns Or with Caps of the Field.
- Motto: To God Only Be All Glory.
- Location: Skinners' Hall, 8 Dowgate Hill, City of London
- Date of formation: 1327; 699 years ago
- Company association: Fur traders
- Order of precedence: 6th or 7th (Note: The Skinners' and Merchant Taylors' Companies alternate their precedence each year.)
- Master of company: The Earl of Woolton
- Website: www.skinners.org.uk

The Worshipful Company of Skinners (also known as the Skinners' Company) is one of the Great Twelve Livery Companies of the City of London. Originally formed as an association of those engaged in the trade of skins and furs, the Company was granted a Royal Charter in 1327.

The Company's motto is To God Only Be All Glory.

The Master Skinner for 2025/26 is Mary Stallebrass. Since 2015, Major-General Andrew Kennett CB CBE has served as Clerk to the Skinners' Company.

== History ==
Under an order issued by the Lord Mayor of London on 10 April 1484 (known as the Billesdon Award), the Company ranks in sixth or seventh place (making it one of the "Great Twelve City Livery Companies") in the order of precedence of City Livery Companies, alternating annually with the Merchant Taylors' Company; these livery companies have borrowed Chaucer's phrase "at sixes and sevens" to describe their rivalry over precedence – specifically which company was entitled to be 6th in order of seniority – being a source of trouble between the Skinners and the Merchant Taylors for some time during the 15th, and perhaps even 14th centuries. Both companies received their first Royal Charters in 1327, but the dispute erupted into lethal violence at the 1484 Lord Mayor's river procession, an occasion which the two guilds treated as their own private boat race. After justice was administered to some of the offenders the then-Lord Mayor, Haberdasher Sir Robert Billesdon, mediated between the two companies at the request of their Masters, and he resolved that each company should have precedence over the other in alternate years and that each company's Master and Wardens should be invited to dine at the other's Hall every year.

The Skinners are normally sixth in the order of precedence in even numbered years, and at seven in odd numbered years, but as the Lord Mayor (Sir David Brewer) for 2005/06 was a member of the Merchant Taylors' Company they kept precedence. The Merchant Taylors retained precedence in 2006/07, their regular turn.

== Education ==
In the present day the Skinners' Company is primarily an educational and charitable institution, supporting the following schools:

- Tonbridge School and The Judd School, Tonbridge;
- The Skinners' School, Skinners' Kent Primary School and The Skinners' Kent Academy, Royal Tunbridge Wells;
- Skinners' Academy, Hackney;
- The Marsh Academy, Romney Marsh;
- The New Beacon Preparatory School, Sevenoaks.

== See also ==
Other leather-related City livery companies:

- Leathersellers' Company
- Cordwainers' Company
- Curriers' Company
- Glovers' Company
- Skinner
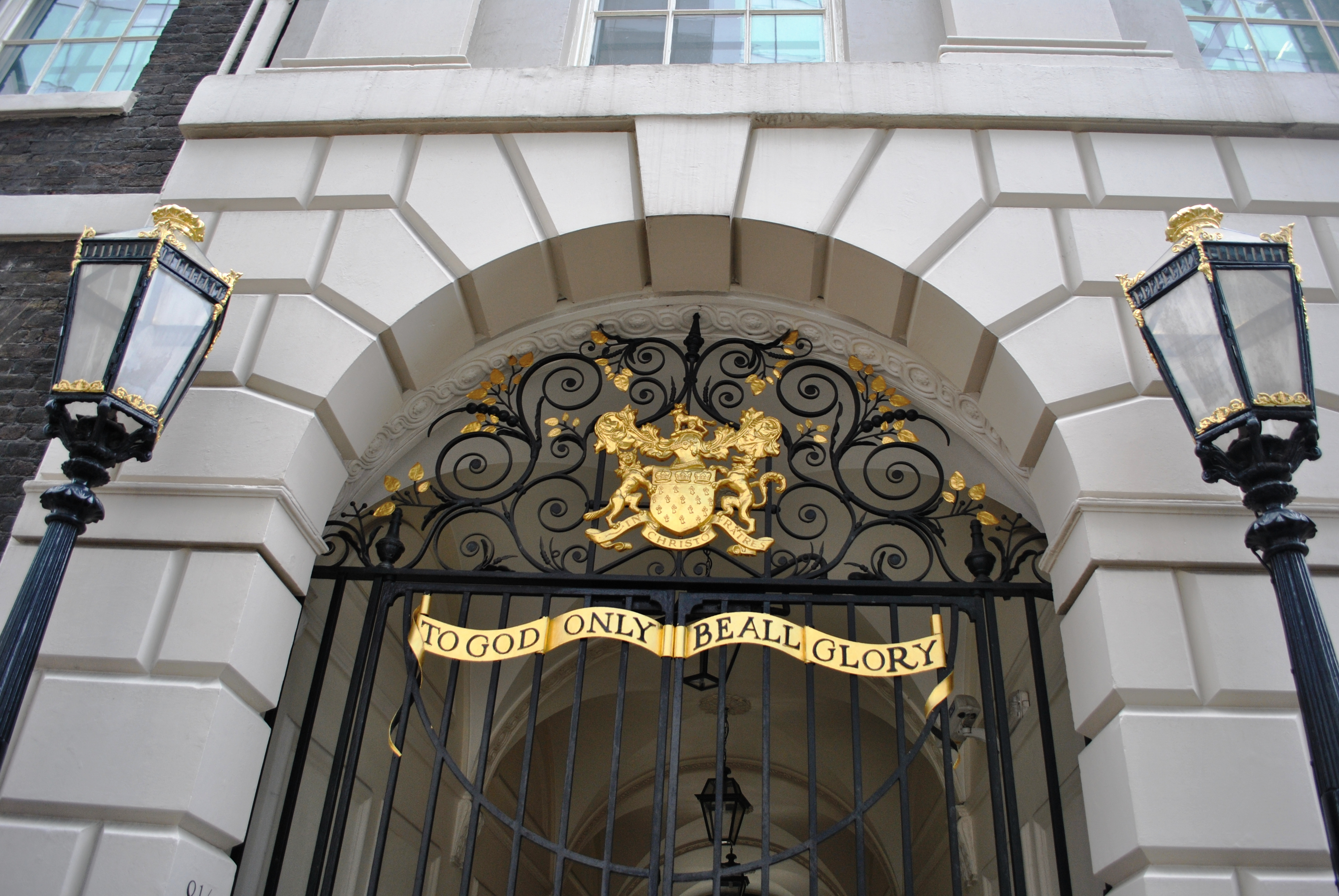
Skinners' Hall entrance

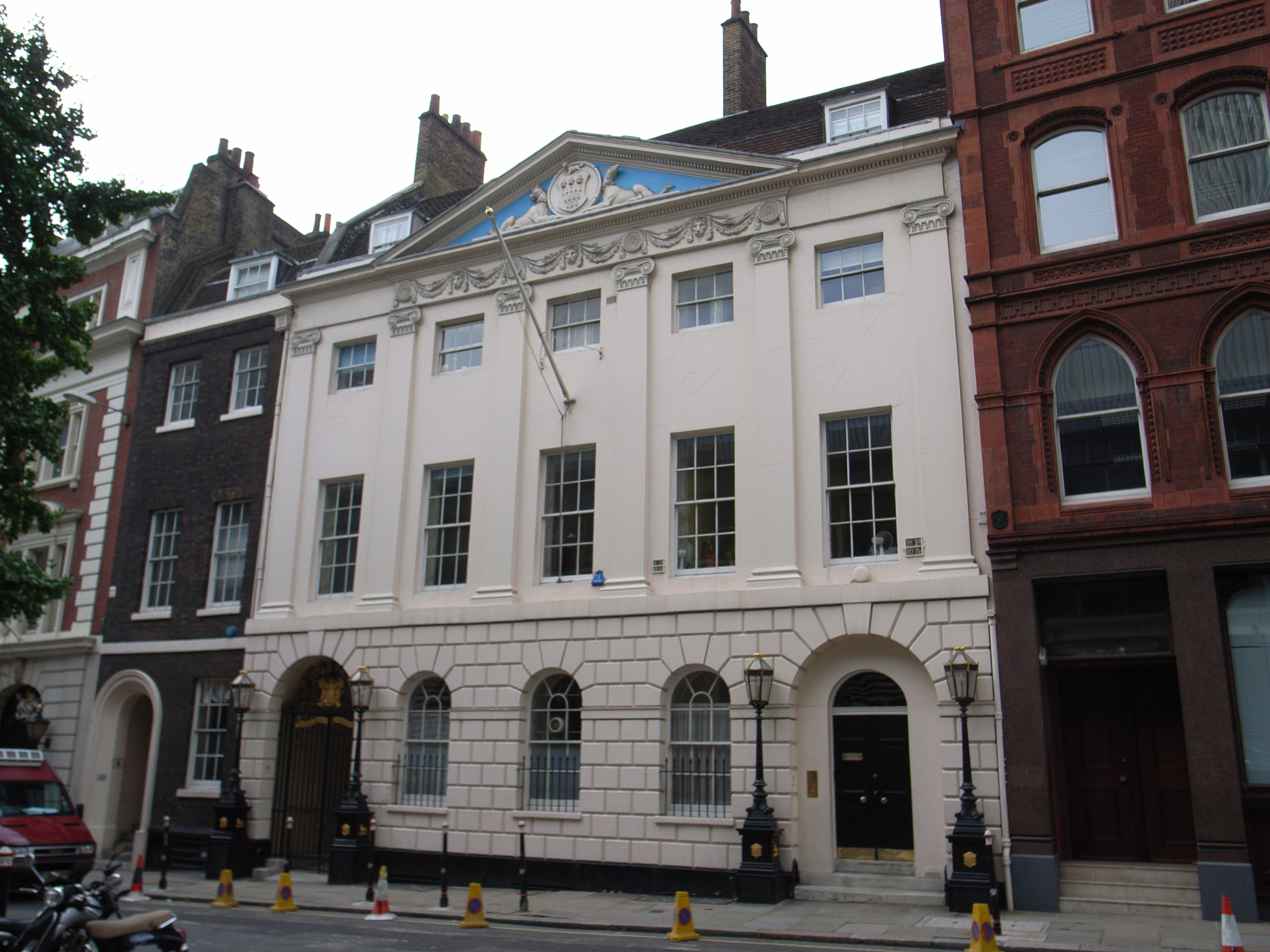
Skinners' Hall, Dowgate Hill, London, built 1770–90 to the design of William Jupp

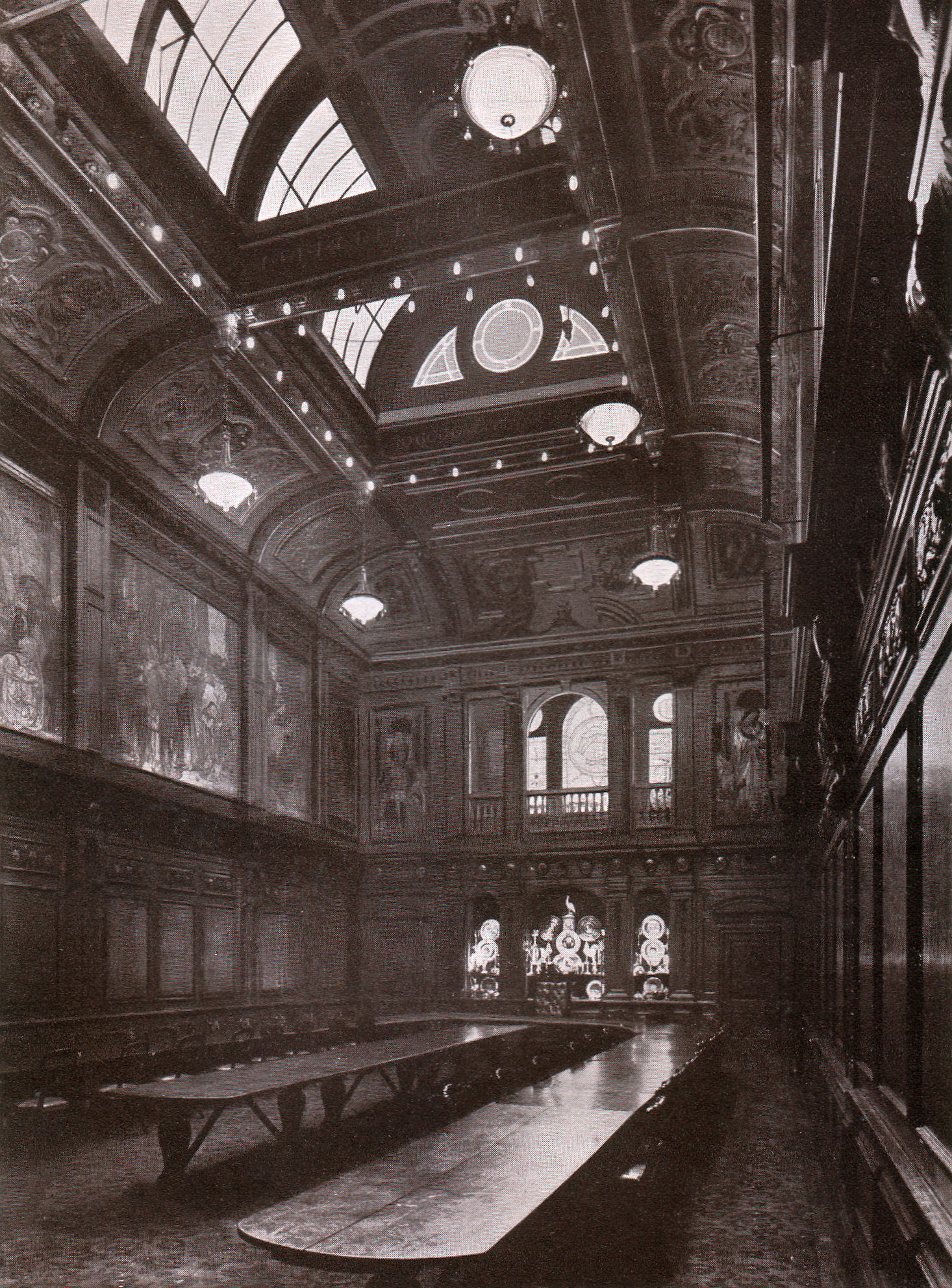
Skinners' livery hall interior (circa 1900)

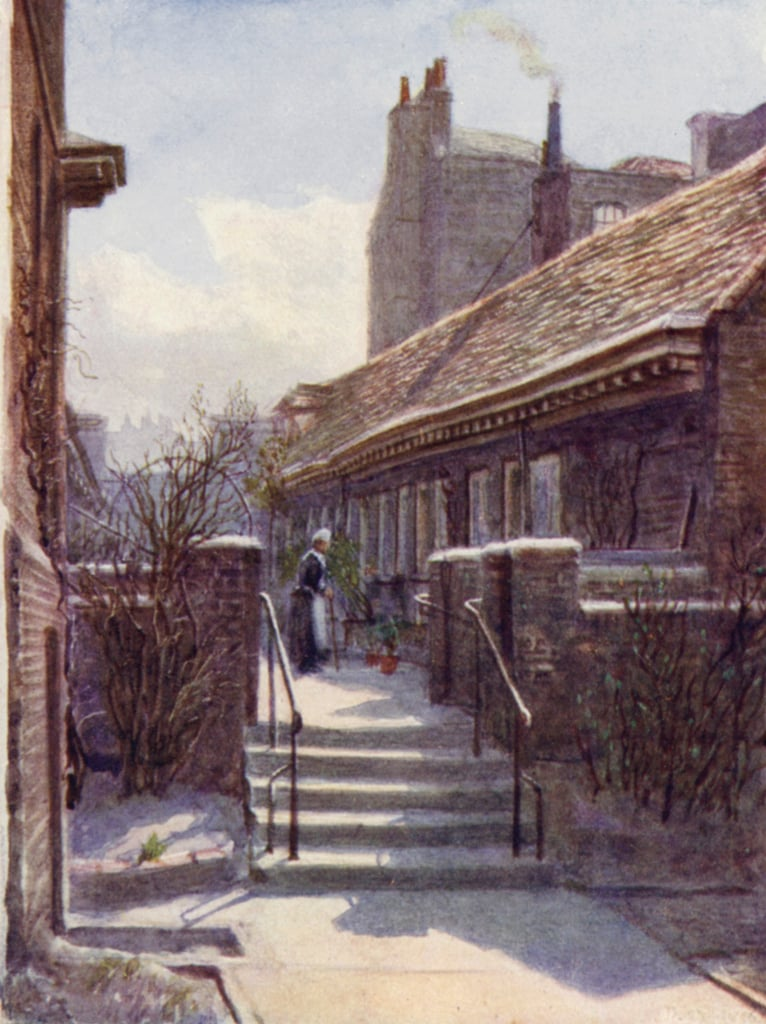
Skinners' Almshouses, Mile End, 1892 by Philip Norman

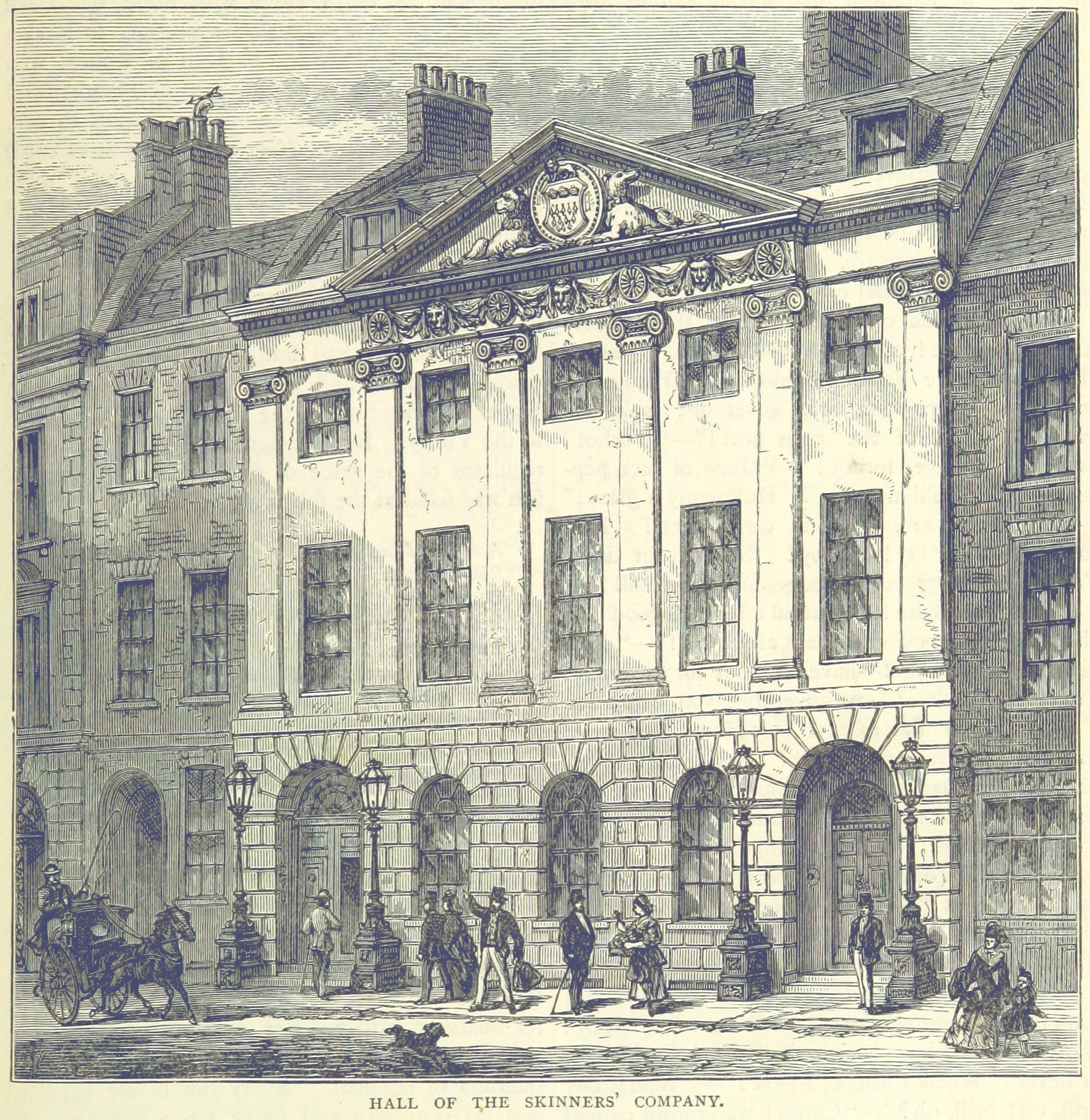
Skinners' Hall in 1873

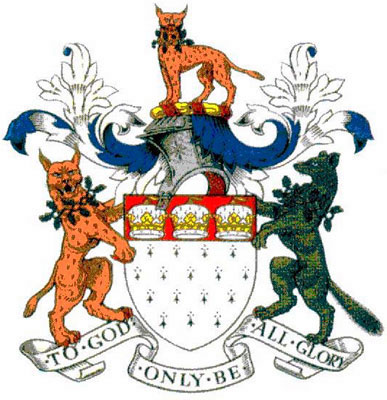
Skinners' Company arms

Arms of Master Skinner
the Earl of Woolton
