= The Skinners' Kent Academy =

Secondary school in Tunbridge Wells, Kent, England

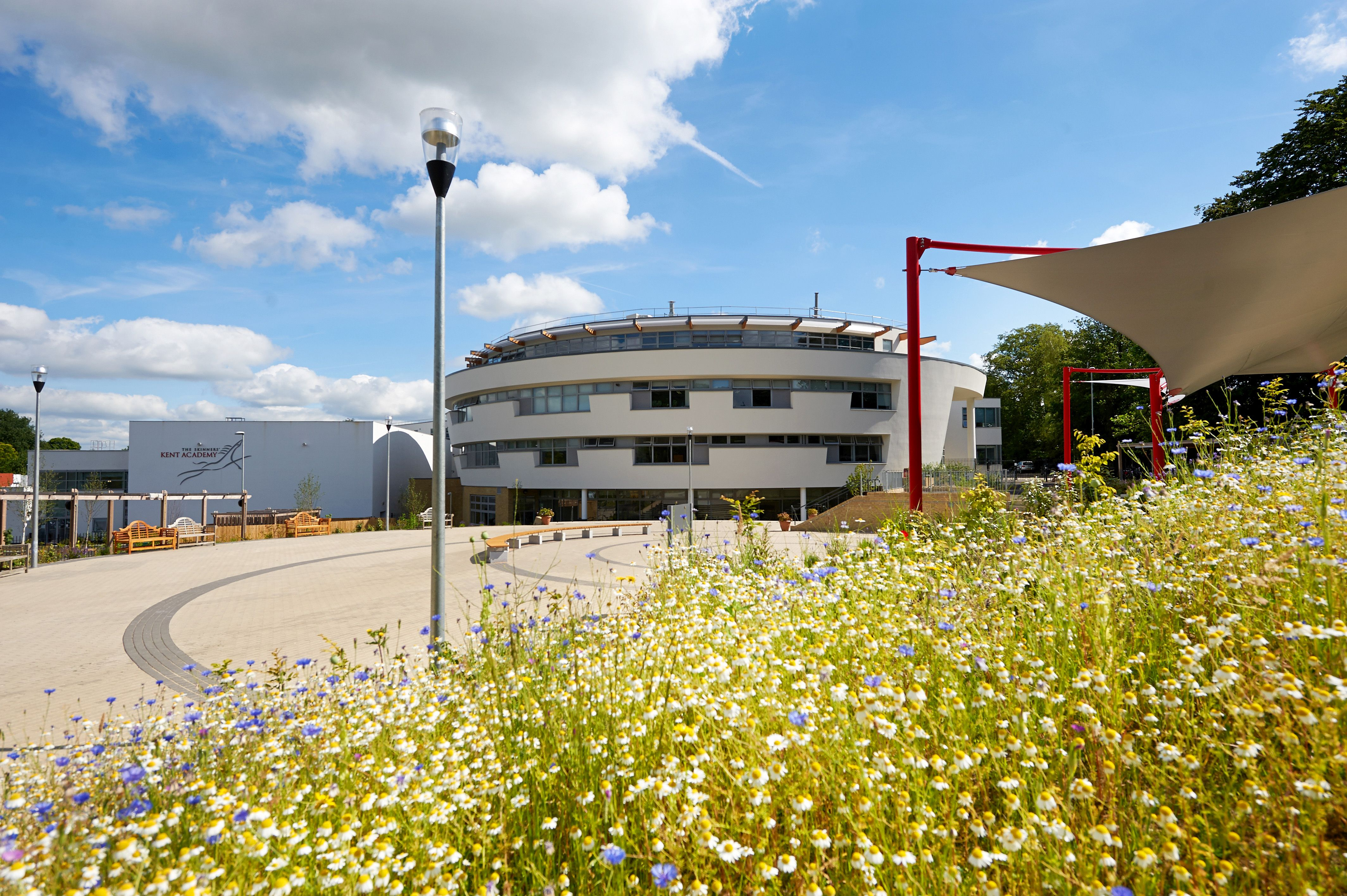

Location
- Sandown park Royal Tunbridge Wells, Kent, TN2 4PY; England; 51°08′28″N 0°17′35″E

Information
- Former name: Tunbridge Wells High School
- Type: Academy
- Established: 2009
- Local authority: Kent County Council
- Trust: sponsor: The Skinners' Company
- Department for Education URN: 135888 Tables
- Ofsted: Reports
- Principal: Hannah Knowles
- Gender: Co-educational
- Age: 11 to 18
- Enrolment: 1084
- Capacity: 1150
- Houses: Attenborough, Hadid, Malala & Obama
- Colours: black & red
- Website: Official website

The Skinners' Kent Academy (formerly Sandown Court then later Tunbridge Wells High School) is a mixed secondary school with academy status in Royal Tunbridge Wells, England.

Tunbridge Wells High School became The Skinners' Kent Academy in September 2009, when the school became an academy, and independent of local authority control. It is non-selective.

== History ==
The original school was called Sandown Court and was built and opened in 1960 It was then renamed Tunbridge Wells High School and was renamed The Skinners' Kent Academy in 2009. The new building was built in 2010.

In September 2010, it was on the shortlist for the 2010 Kent Design Awards.

== Curriculum ==
The school offers the International Baccalaureate Middle Years Programme (Years 7-9) and Career-related Programme (Sixth Form). All maintained schools in England must follow the National Curriculum, and are inspected by Ofsted on how well they succeed in delivering a 'broad and balanced curriculum'. Schools endeavour to get all students to achieve the English Baccalaureate(EBACC) qualification, including core subjects, a modern or ancient foreign language, and either history or geography.

The Skinners' Kent Academy does this within the framework of the IB Middle Years Programme. Up until this year Kent Academy operated a two-year Key Stage 3 where all the core National Curriculum subjects are taught, followed for three years preparing for GCSE exams. This was reversed on the intervention of Ofsted who announced that was not the intention and were restricting the target 'outstanding grade' to schools who followed the traditional path.

In years 10 and 11, that is in Key Stage 4, students study a core of English language, English literature, mathematics, science, core PE, PSHE (sex and relationships education) and religious education. All students study French. History is more popular than geography. Computing/Computer/Science are taken in equal numbers by a third of the year group each.

== Academic performance and inspection by Ofsted ==
In the five years before becoming an academy, the school was consistently ranked in the top 5% nationally for adding value and was the top secondary school in West Kent based on CVA scores.

The English Baccalaureate is achieved by 61% of the students against 40% nationally.

As of 2024, the school's most recent inspection by Ofsted was in 2016, with an outcome of Good.

== Buildings ==
The old buildings were replaced in 2010 with an award-winning design. The contractors were Willmott Dixon. It is based on a four-storey hub building with three three-storey rectangular teaching blocks set at 45’ to each other, and a further large sports block opposite.

The school required extra capacity to host its new one form entry, 3-11 primary school. They worked closely with KCC and the appointed contractors, Baxall Construction. It is a bespoke two-storey timber-framed, sustainable, offsite, factory construction. The building was designed using 3D CAD software, by Willmott Dixon in discussion with the staff. The components which included the floors and the walls with the windows already in place, were all delivered at the same time as flat packs on lorries.
