= Theodora Elizabeth Lynch =

English poet and novelist

- Born: 1812
- Died: 1885 (aged 72–73); St John's Wood, London, England
- Occupation: Novelist
- Writing career
- Genre: Poetry

Theodora Elizabeth Lynch, born Foulks (1812–1885) was an English poet and novelist.

== Biography ==
Theodora Elizabeth Foulks was the daughter of Arthur Foulks and his wife, Mary Ann McKenzie. She born at Dale Park, Madehurst, Sussex, in 1812. Her father was a Jamaica sugar-planter who owned over 400 slaves on his plantation, the Lodge estate, now in the parish of Saint Catherine.

Foulks was married on 28 December 1835 to Henry Mark Lynch, second son of John Lynch of Kingston, Jamaica. Her husband, born in Kingston on 29 October 1814, was admitted a student of the Middle Temple on 31 May 1837, and was called to the bar on 12 June 1840. He practised in Jamaica, and was nominated to be one of the judges there, but died of yellow fever at Kingston on 15 July 1845. He was buried at Halfway Free Church, Saint Andrew Parish, on 16 July.

After her husband's death she returned to England and devoted herself to writing fiction. Her books, often set in the West Indies, are mostly intended for young people. She died in St John's Wood, London, in June 1885, aged 75.

== Works ==
Her published works were:

1. Lays of the Sea, and other Poems. By Personne. i.e. T.E. Lynch, 1846; 2nd edit. 1850.
2. The Cotton Tree, or Emily, the little West Indian, 1847; another edit. 1853.
3. The Family Sepulchre, a Tale of Jamaica, 1848.
4. Maude Effingham, a Tale of Jamaica, 1849.
5. Stories from the Acts of the Apostles, 1850.
6. The Little Teacher, 2nd edit. 1851.
7. The Mountain Pastor, 1852.
8. Millie Howard, or Trust in God, 1864.
9. The Red Brick House, 1866.
10. The Wonders of the West Indies, 1866.
11. The Story of my Girlhood, 1857.
12. The Exodus of the Children of Israel, and their Wanderings in the Desert, 1857.
13. The Story of the Patriarchs, 1860.
14. Son of the Evening Land, and other Poems, 1861.
15. Rose and her Mission, a Tale of the West Indies, 1863.
16. The Sabbaths of the Year, hymns for Children, 1864.
17. Years Ago, a Tale of West Indian Domestic Life of the Eighteenth Century, 1865.
