= Rural Pie Scheme =

WWII British food scheme

The Rural Pie Scheme was organised by the Ministry of Food to provide pies for labourers in the countryside who did not have access to a works canteen or British Restaurant. It started in 1942 and was quite successful so that, in one week of 1944, 1.3 million pies were sold through the scheme.
