= Minister of Food =

British government ministerial posts

The Minister of Food Control (1916–1921) and the Minister of Food (1939–1958) were British government ministerial posts separated from that of the Minister of Agriculture. In the Great War the Ministry sponsored a network of canteens known as National Kitchens. In the Second World War a major task of the Ministry was to oversee rationing in the United Kingdom arising out of World War II. The Minister was assisted by a Parliamentary Secretary. The Parliamentary Under Secretary of State for Food and Animal Welfare (2018–present; vacant since 2019) was appointed at the Department for the Environment, Food and Rural Affairs to ensure the continued supply of sufficient food during the Brexit process.

The ministry's work was transferred in 1921 to the Board of Trade which had a small Food Department between the wars. This became its Food (Defence Plans) Department in 1937 and was then constituted as the Ministry of Food on the outbreak of war in 1939.

Jamie's Ministry of Food was a 2008 UK TV programme featuring celebrity chef Jamie Oliver that aimed to recreate the successes of the Ministry of Food in encouraging healthy eating.

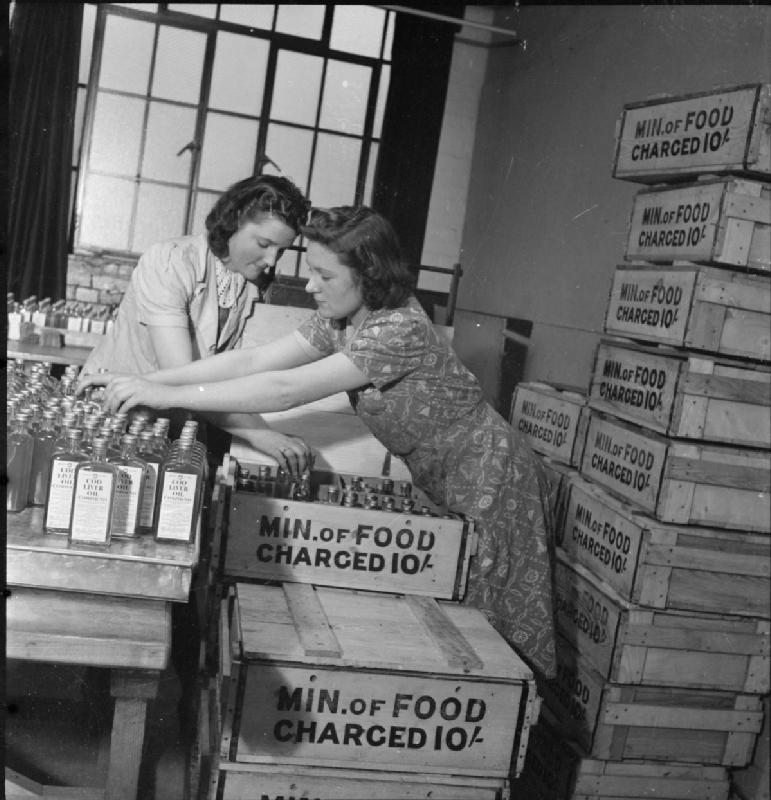
Women packing bottles of cod liver oil into crates stamped with the words "Min. of Food Charged 10 shillings"

== Second World War ==
In April 1940 Lord Woolton, a prominent businessman, was appointed Minister of Food by Neville Chamberlain, one of a number of ministerial appointments from outside politics. Woolton retained this position until 1943. He supervised 50,000 employees and over a thousand local offices where people could obtain ration cards. His ministry had a virtual monopoly of all food sold in Britain, whether imported or local. His mission was to guarantee adequate nutrition for everyone. With food supplies cut sharply because of enemy action and the needs of the services, rationing was essential. Woolton and his advisors had one scheme in mind but economists convinced them to try point rationing. Everyone would have a certain number of points a month that they could allocate any way they wanted. They tried an experiment and it worked very well. Indeed, food rationing was a major success story in Britain's war.

In the dark days of late June 1940, with a German invasion threatened, Woolton reassured the public that emergency food stocks were in place that would last "for weeks and weeks" even if the shipping could not get through. He said "iron rations" were stored for use only in great emergency. Other rations were stored in the outskirts of cities liable to German bombing. When the Blitz began in late summer 1940 he was ready with more than 200 feeding stations in London and other cities under attack.

Woolton was faced with the task of overseeing rationing due to wartime shortages. He took the view that it was insufficient to merely impose restrictions but that a programme of advertising to support it was also required. He warned that meat and cheese, as well as bacon and eggs, were in very short supply and would remain that way. Calling for a simpler diet, he noted that there was plenty of bread, potatoes, vegetable oils, fats and milk. He asked the mathematician Martin Roseveare to design the ration books.

In 1940 Woolton set up Advice Centres throughout the country, with cookery demonstrations and recipe leaflets showing how to make the best use of rations. As imported wheat became scarce, the cartoon character 'Potato Pete' encouraged people to eat more potatoes.

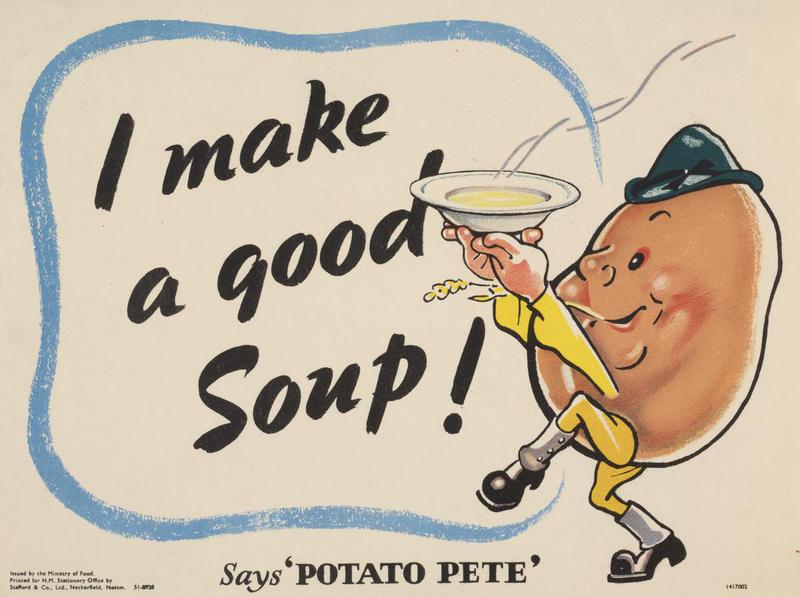
Poster featuring the anthropomorphic cartoon Potato Pete saying "I make a good soup!"

By January 1941 the usual overseas food supply had fallen to half what it had been. However, by 1942 ample food supplies were arriving through Lend Lease from the U.S. and a similar Canadian programme. Lend Lease was a gift and there was no charge. Most food was now rationed. Worried about children, Lord Woolton made sure that by 1942 Britain was providing 650,000 children with free meals at schools; about 3,500,000 children received milk at school, in addition to priority supplies at home. The bad news was that his "national loaf" of mushy grey wholemeal bread replaced the ordinary white variety, to the distaste of most housewives. Children were sad to learn that supplies of sweets were reduced to save shipping space on sugar and chocolate.

Woolton kept food prices down; eggs and other items were subsidised. He promoted recipes that worked well with the rationing system, most famously the meatless "Woolton pie" which consisted of carrots, parsnips, potatoes and turnips in oatmeal, with a pastry or potato crust and served with brown gravy. Woolton's business skills made the Ministry of Food's difficult job a success and he earned a strong personal popularity despite the shortages.

== Post-war efforts ==
In the postwar years, the Ministry of Food expanded its efforts to promote public health through the Welfare Foods Scheme. Originally developed during the war to maintain nutrition among vulnerable groups, the program provided items such as cod liver oil, concentrated orange juice, and vitamin tablets to pregnant women, nursing mothers, and young children. These supplements were distributed through health clinics and local food offices as part of a broader national effort to prevent childhood illnesses such as rickets. The bottles of concentrated orange juice became a recognizable symbol of the growing welfare state in Britain, combining public health goals with the continuing legacy of wartime food policy.

== List of ministers ==
=== Food control (1916–1921) ===
Minister of Food Control
Name	Portrait	Term of office		Political party
Hudson Kearley, 1st Baron Devonport; Hereditary peer		10 December 1916	19 June 1917	Liberal
David Alfred Thomas, 1st Baron Rhondda; Hereditary peer		19 June 1917	3 July 1918	Liberal
J. R. Clynes; MP for Manchester Platting		9 July 1918	10 January 1919	Labour
George Roberts; MP for Norwich		10 January 1919	19 March 1920	Labour
Charles McCurdy; MP for Northampton		19 March 1920	31 March 1921	Liberal

Responsibilities transferred to the Board of Trade 1921–1939.

=== Food (1939–1958) ===
Minister of Food
Name	Portrait	Term of office		Political party
W. S. Morrison; MP for Cirencester and Tewkesbury		4 September 1939	3 April 1940	Conservative
Frederick Marquis, 1st Baron Woolton; Hereditary peer		3 April 1940	11 November 1943	Independent
Colonel J. J. Llewellin; MP for Uxbridge		11 November 1943	26 July 1945	Conservative
Sir Ben Smith; MP for Rotherhithe		3 August 1945	26 May 1946	Labour
John Strachey; MP for Dundee		27 May 1946	28 February 1950	Labour
Maurice Webb; MP for Bradford Central		28 February 1950	26 October 1951	Labour
Major Gwilym Lloyd George; MP for Newcastle upon Tyne North		31 October 1951	18 October 1954	Liberal & Conservative
Derick Heathcoat-Amory; MP for Tiverton		18 October 1954	6 January 1958	Conservative

Heathcoat-Amory jointly held the separate posts of Minister of Agriculture & Fisheries and Minister of Food 1954–55, pending their merger in 1955 when he assumed the post of Minister of Agriculture, Fisheries and Food.

=== Food and animal welfare (2018–present) ===
Parliamentary Under Secretary of State for Food and Animal Welfare
Name	Portrait	Term of office		Political party
David Rutley; MP for Macclesfield		3 September 2018	27 July 2019	Conservative

Vacant since 2019.

== See also ==
- Rural Pie Scheme (1942)
