= Auchnacree =

Village in Angus, Scotland

Coordinates: 56.762703°N 2.878366°W

- Location within Angus
- OS grid reference: NO464638
- Council area: Angus
- Lieutenancy area: Angus
- Country: Scotland
- Sovereign state: United Kingdom
- Police: Scotland
- Fire: Scottish
- Ambulance: Scottish

Auchnacree is an estate in Angus, Scotland, five miles north of Forfar.

In 1921 the estate overseer, Mr Frank Rae, discovered what is now called the Auchnacree Hoard. This comprised two knives, three axeheads and an armlet, all in bronze, which are dated to the early Bronze Age. Some of the objects appear to have been deliberately broken which suggests a ritual deposit rather than a lost cache.
