= Woolton pie =

Vegetable pie

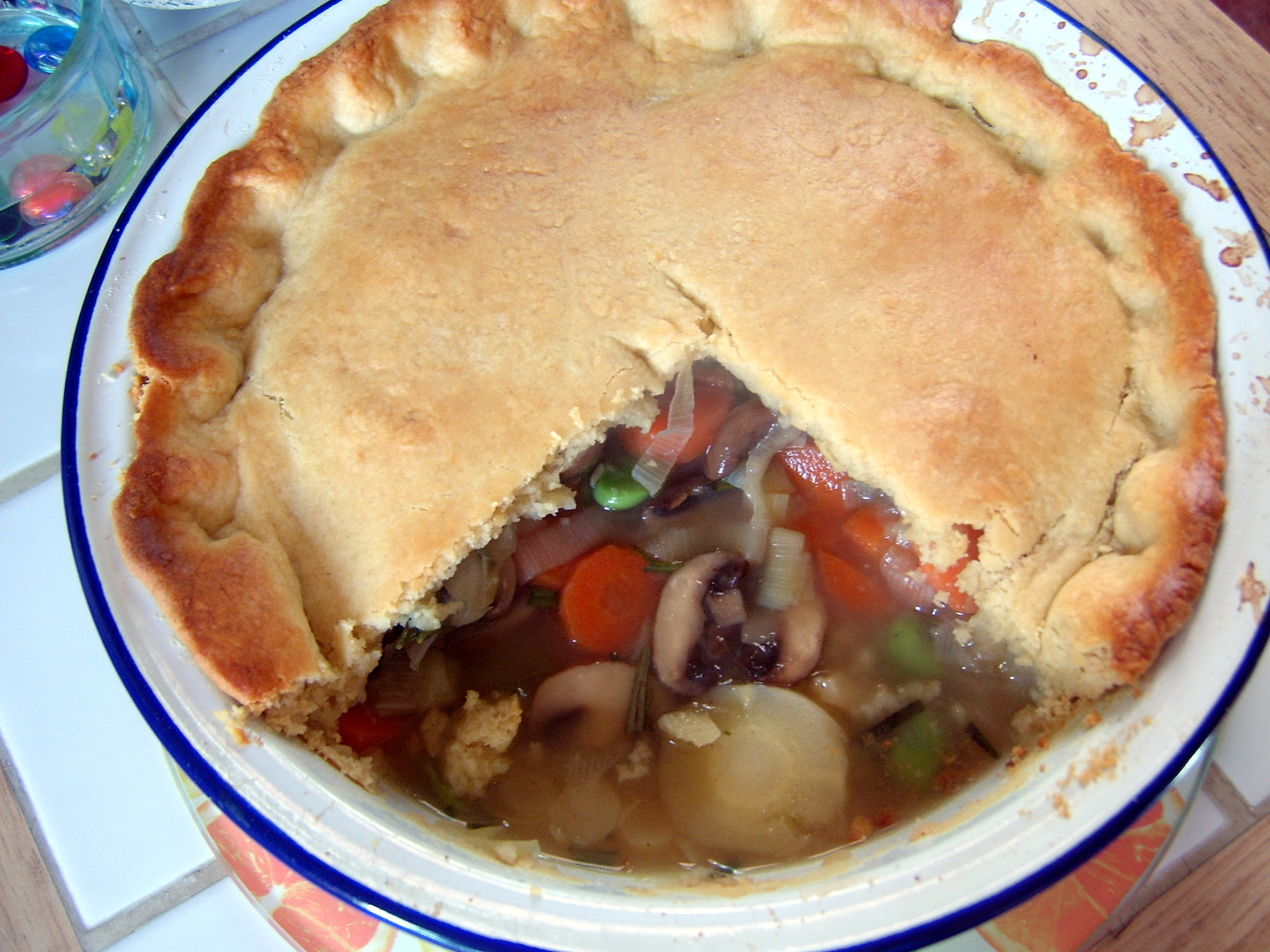
- Type: Savoury pie
- Course: Main
- Place of origin: United Kingdom
- Region or state: London
- Created by: François Latry
- Invented: 1941
- Serving temperature: Hot
- Main ingredients: Vegetables; Pastry lid

Woolton pie is a pastry dish of vegetables, which was widely served in Britain during the Second World War when rationing and shortages made meat scarce. The recipe was created by François Latry, Maître Chef des Cuisines at the Savoy Hotel in London, and appeared on the Savoy menu as "Le Lord Woolton Pie".

It was first publicised in an April 1941 article in The Times that described the dish as economic and wholesome and gave the recipe. It was one of a number of recipes commended to the British public by the Ministry of Food to enable a nutritious diet to be maintained despite shortages and rationing of food, especially meat.

It was named after Frederick Marquis, 1st Earl of Woolton (1883–1964), who became Minister of Food in 1940 and who subsequently promoted the recipe.

== Recipe ==
The recipe involved dicing and cooking potatoes (or parsnips), cauliflower, carrots and possibly turnip. Other vegetables were added where available. Rolled oats and chopped spring onions were added to the thickened vegetable water which was poured over the vegetables. The dish was topped with potato or wheatmeal pastry and served with vegetable gravy. The content of the pie filling could easily be altered to include whatever vegetables were in season at the time.

== Reception ==
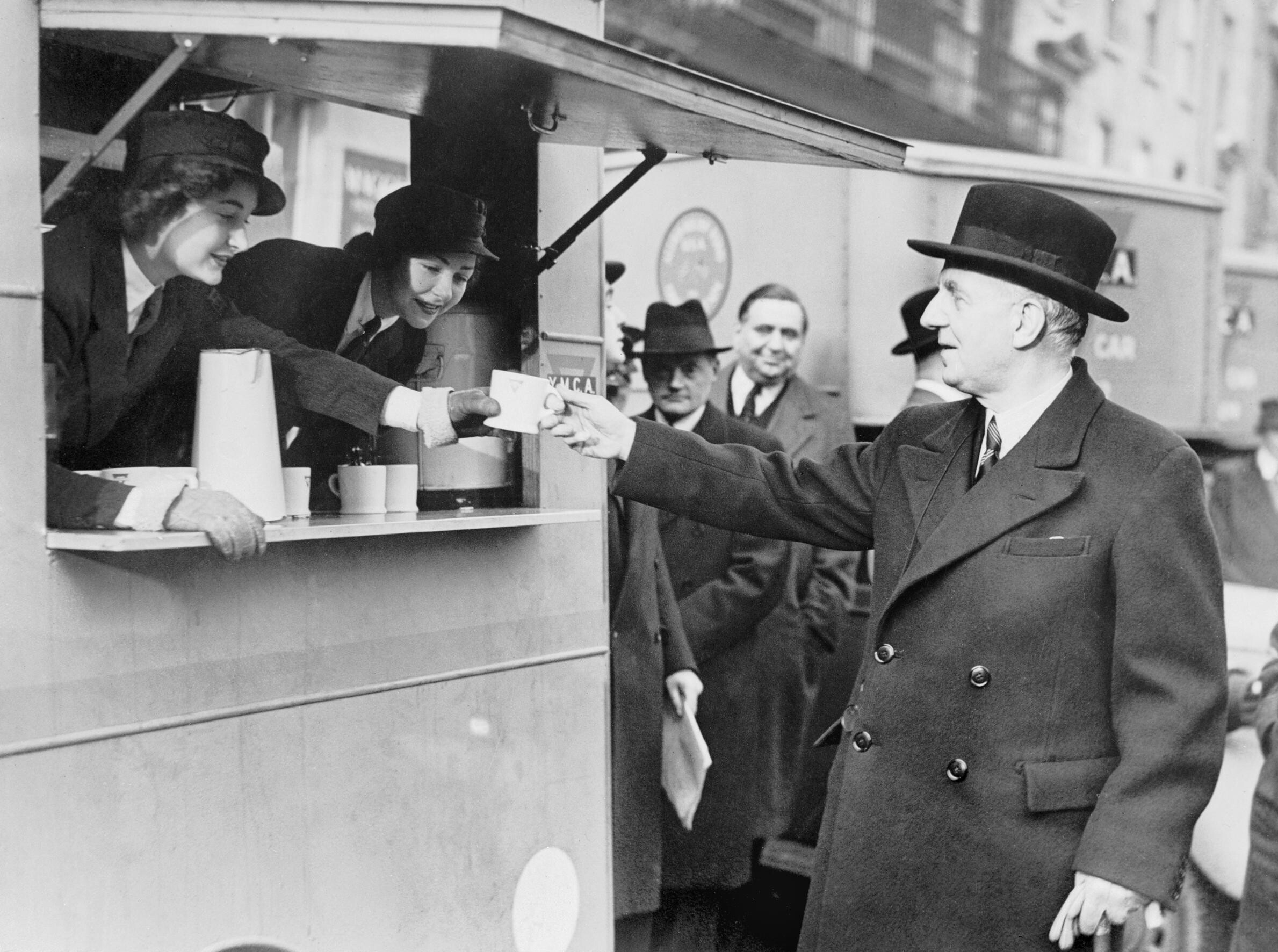
The British Minister for Food between April 1940 and 11 November 1943, Lord Woolton, receiving a cup of tea from a mobile canteen

People realised that meat was in very scarce supply, but that still did not overcome traditions of meat pies. Woolton pie, entirely lacking meat, was not universally well received. An editorial in The Times commented:

When Woolton pie was being forced on somewhat reluctant tables, Lord Woolton performed a valuable service by submitting to the flashlight camera at public luncheons while eating, with every sign of enjoyment, the dish named after him.

Professor John Fuller has noted that Woolton pie and similar wartime austerity dishes "were forgotten as quickly as possible when conditions returned to normal". One notable exception is carrot cake, which, while not invented during the war, was popularised in the United Kingdom then because it used the widely available root vegetable in place of some of the scarce flour, fat and sugar found in other cakes.

== Publication ==
The recipe for Woolton pie has been published on a number of occasions since the war, notably in collections to mark significant anniversaries, e.g. Marguerite Patten's (1985) We'll Eat Again, marking the 40th anniversary of the end of the war in Europe.

== See also ==
- Feeding Britain in World War II
- List of foods named after people
- List of pies, tarts and flans
- Rationing in the United Kingdom
