= Madehurst =

Village and parish in West Sussex, England

Coordinates: 50°53′05″N 0°36′01″W

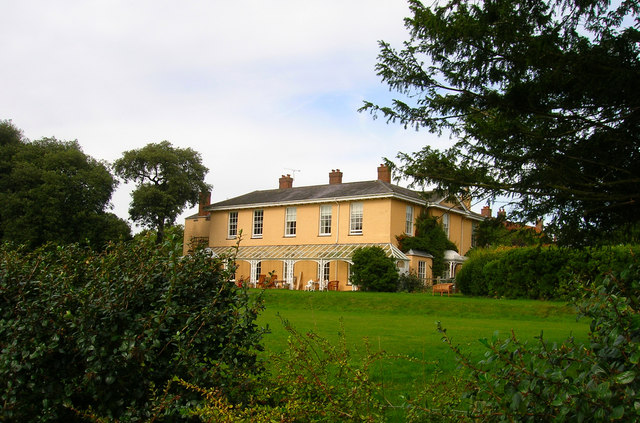
- Madehurst Lodge

- Location within West Sussex
- Area: 7.66 km^{2} (2.96 sq mi)
- Population: 120 (Civil Parish.2011)
  - Density: 16/km^{2} (41/sq mi)
- OS grid reference: SU984100
  - London: 48 miles (77 km) NNE
- Civil parish: Madehurst
- District: Arun
- Shire county: West Sussex
- Region: South East
- Country: England
- Sovereign state: United Kingdom
- Post town: ARUNDEL
- Postcode district: BN18
- Dialling code: 01903
- Police: Sussex
- Fire: West Sussex
- Ambulance: South East Coast
- UK Parliament: Arundel and South Downs

Madehurst is a small village and civil parish in the Arun District of West Sussex, England on the south slopes of the South Downs in the South Downs National Park. It is three miles (5 km) north-west of Arundel, to the west of the A29 road. The village of Madehurst is in two well-wooded valleys, listed in park guides.

== Economy ==
Many of the few inhabitants are farmers, retired, or commute as far afield as London, Portsmouth or Brighton.

== The parish church ==
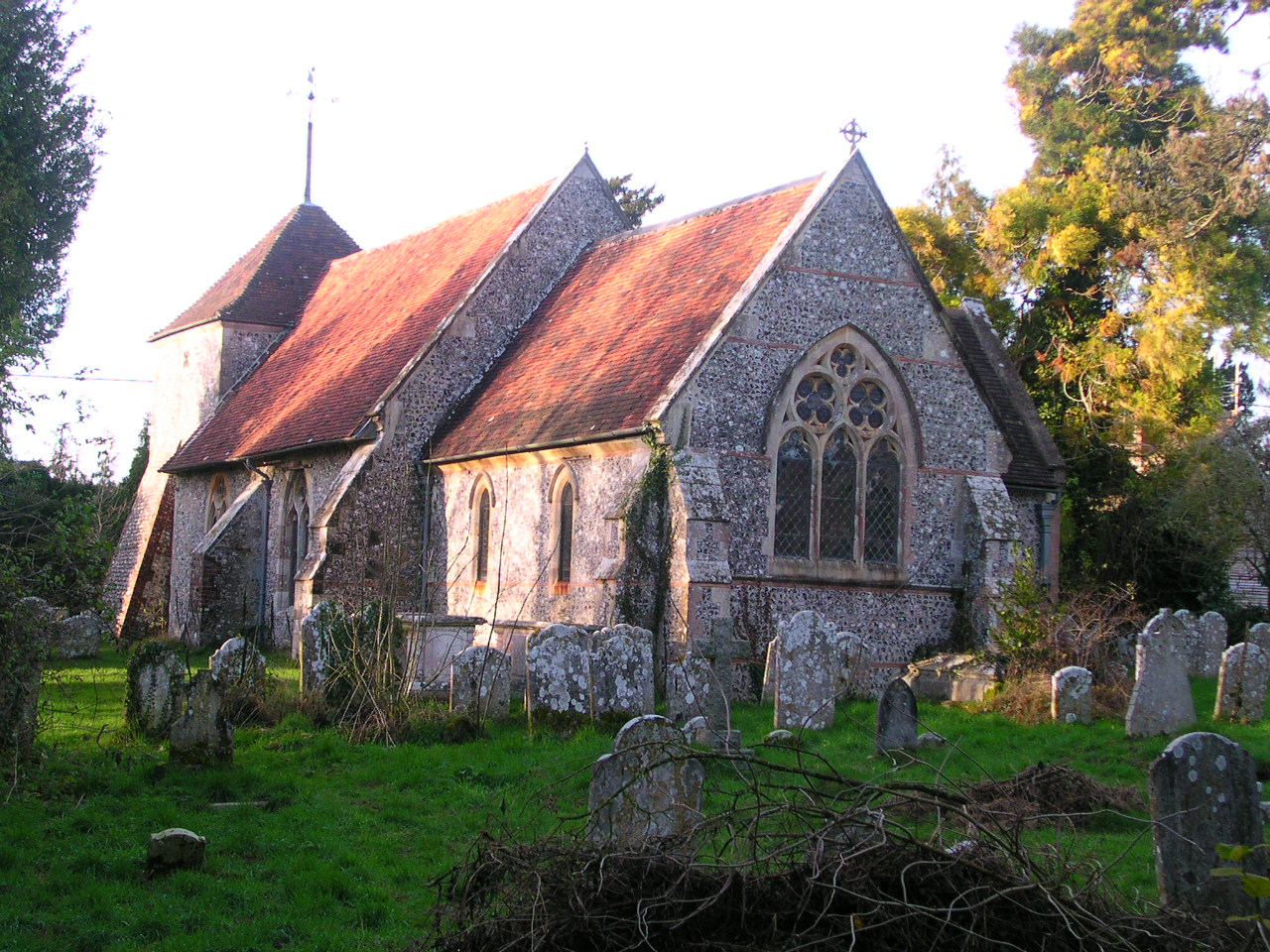
St. Mary Magdalene, Madehurst

The Anglican parish church, dedicated to St. Mary Magdalene, is built of local flint. It was restored and enlarged in 1864, when the north aisle and a new chancel were added.

== Notable residents ==
Theodora Elizabeth Lynch, a novelist, was born here in 1813.

== Recreation ==
For its population, the village has a notable Cricket Club. A new pavilion was completed in 2011 which features luxury showers. The view from near Dale Park Farm over New Barn Farm towards Parletts Farm is elevated stretching for tens of miles and open to public visits. A listed walk and marked path is to the local summit at Bignor Post: this starts from Chichester Lodge (on the A29) in the south-west, proceeds through The Drove, New Barn and Parletts farms and finishes at Stammers Wood in the north-west. Other paths scale the local slopes, including The Denture along part of the northern boundary which nearby joins the Monarch's Way through the hills. The parish aside from its aged cluster has been kept mostly undeveloped; before the creation of the National Park, consistently new buildings, residential or commercial, have proven to be against applicable planning policies since the 1950s.

== Gallery ==
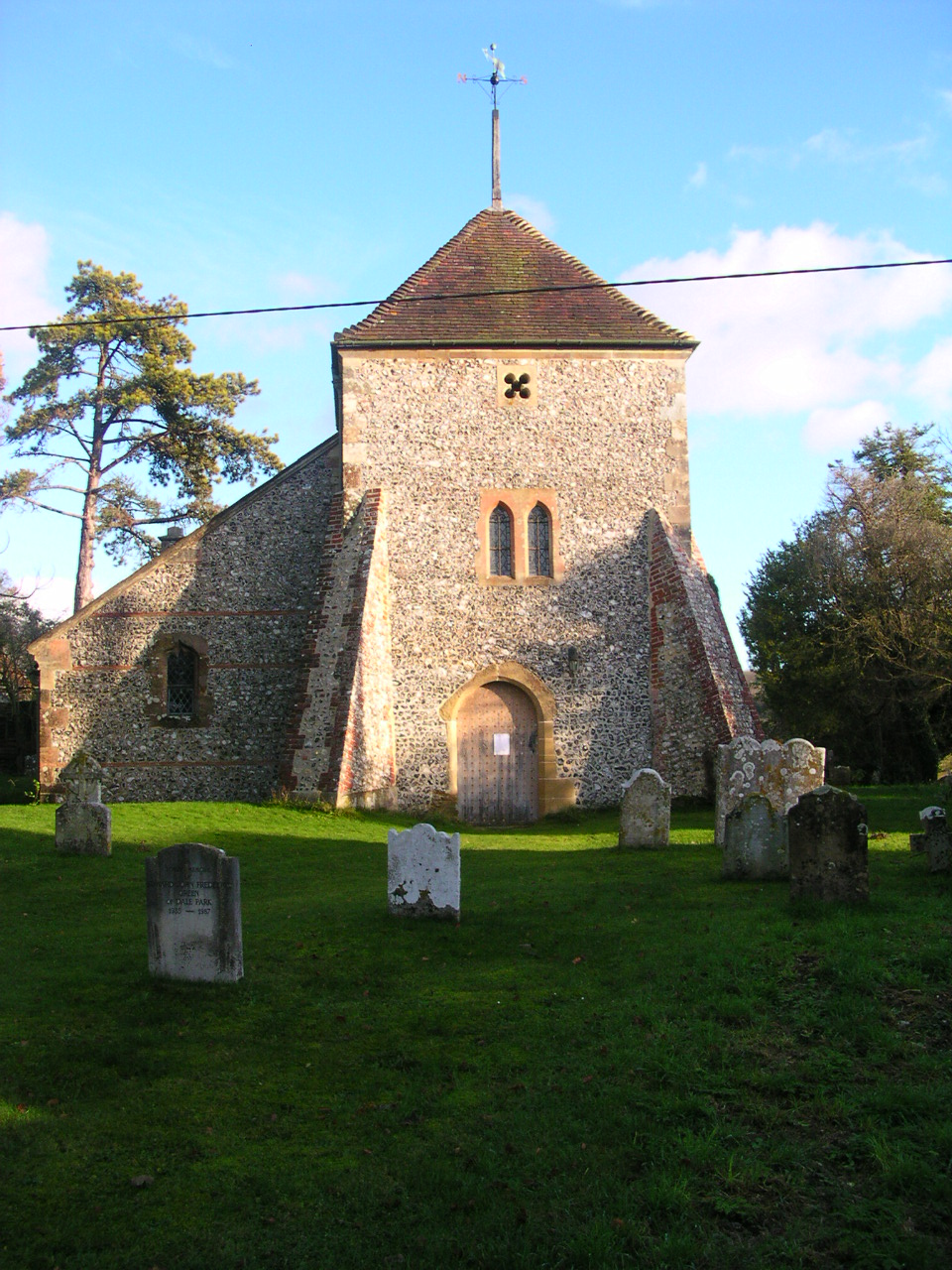
The church seen from the road
