= Frederick Marquis, 1st Earl of Woolton =

English businessman and statesman (1883–1964)

The Right Honourable The Earl of Woolton CH PC DL
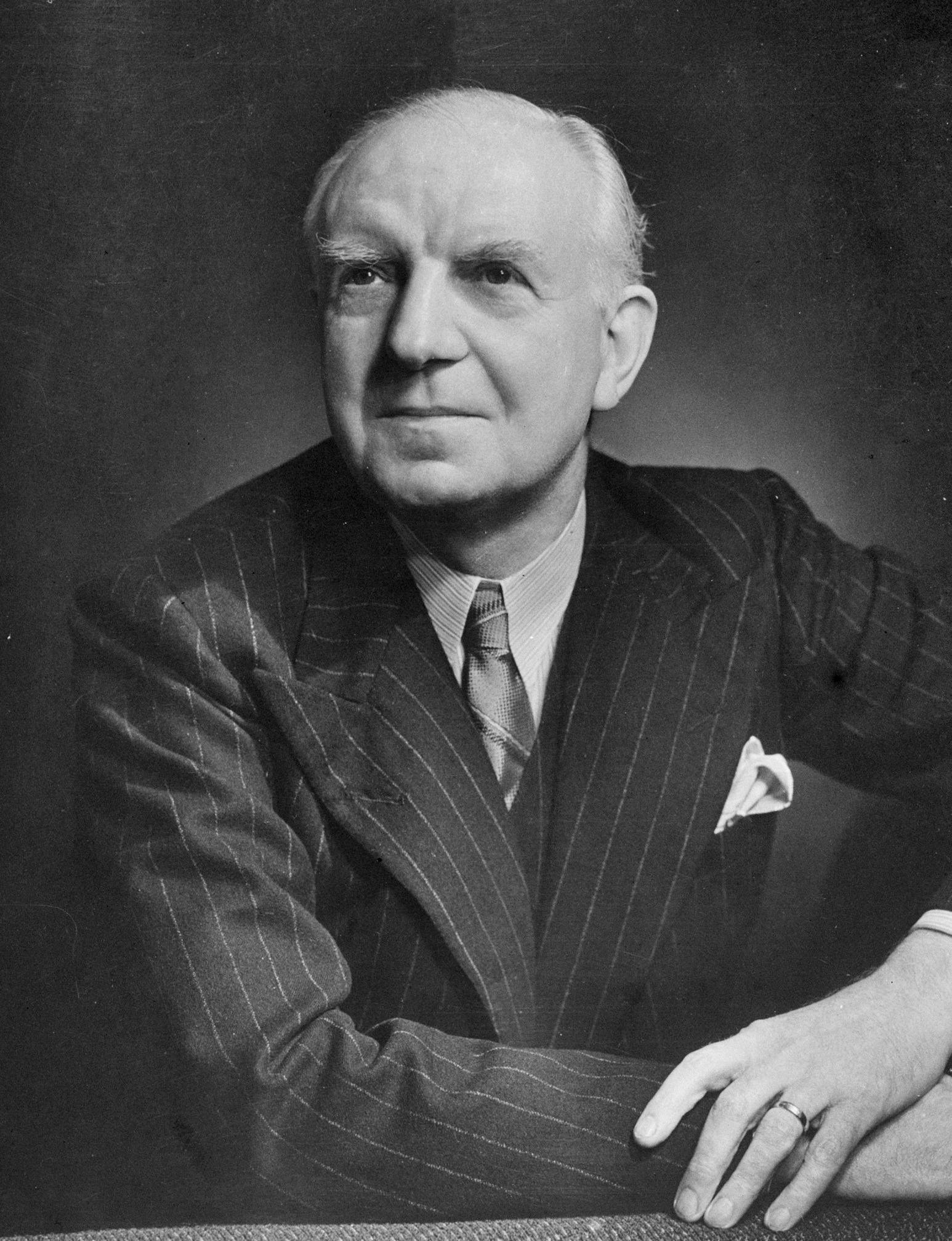
- Portrait by Yousuf Karsh

Minister of Materials
- In office 1 September 1953 – 16 August 1954
- Prime Minister: Winston Churchill
- Preceded by: Arthur Salter
- Succeeded by: Office abolished

Chancellor of the Duchy of Lancaster
- In office 24 November 1952 – 20 December 1955
- Prime Minister: Winston Churchill; Anthony Eden
- Preceded by: The Viscount Swinton
- Succeeded by: The Earl of Selkirk

Lord President of the Council
- In office 28 October 1951 – 24 November 1952
- Prime Minister: Winston Churchill
- Preceded by: The Viscount Addison
- Succeeded by: The Marquess of Salisbury
- In office 28 May 1945 – 27 July 1945
- Prime Minister: Winston Churchill
- Preceded by: Clement Attlee
- Succeeded by: Herbert Morrison

Chairman of the Conservative Party
- In office 1 July 1946 – 1 November 1955
- Leader: Winston Churchill; Anthony Eden
- Preceded by: Ralph Assheton
- Succeeded by: Oliver Poole

Minister of Reconstruction
- In office 11 November 1943 – 23 May 1945
- Prime Minister: Winston Churchill
- Preceded by: Office established
- Succeeded by: Office abolished

Minister of Food
- In office 3 April 1940 – 11 November 1943
- Prime Minister: Winston Churchill
- Preceded by: William Morrison
- Succeeded by: John Llewellin

Member of the House of Lords
- Lord Temporal
- Hereditary peerage 7 July 1939 – 14 December 1964
- Succeeded by: The 2nd Earl of Woolton

Personal details
- Born: Frederick James Marquis; 23 August 1883 Ordsall, Salford, Lancashire, England
- Died: 14 December 1964 (aged 81) Arundel, Sussex, England
- Party: Conservative
- Spouse(s): Maud Smith (m. 1912; died 1961) Margaret Thomas (m. 1962)
- Children: 2
- Education: Victoria University of Manchester
- Occupation: Businessman, politician

Frederick James Marquis, 1st Earl of Woolton, CH, PC (23 August 1883 – 14 December 1964), was an English businessman and politician who served as chairman of the Conservative Party from 1946 to 1955.

In April 1940, he was appointed Minister of Food and established the rationing system. During this time, he maintained food imports from America and organised a programme of free school meals. The vegetarian Woolton pie was named after Woolton, as one of the recipes commended to the British public due to a shortage of meat, fish, and dairy products during the Second World War. In 1943, Woolton was appointed Minister of Reconstruction, planning for post-war Britain.

== Early life and education ==
Woolton was born at 163 West Park Street in Ordsall, Salford, Lancashire, in 1883. He was the only surviving child of a saddler, Thomas Robert Marquis (1857–1944), and his wife, Margaret Marquis, née Ormerod (1854–1923). He was educated at Ardwick Higher Elementary School, at Manchester Grammar School and at the University of Manchester from which he graduated with a BSc in 1906.

Woolton was an active member of the Unitarian Church. He was active in social work in Liverpool (1906–1918).

Woolton hoped to pursue an academic career in the social sciences, but his wish was frustrated by his family's financial circumstances, and he became a mathematics teacher at Burnley Grammar School. He was forced to turn down a research fellowship in Sociology at the University of London but was elected a research fellow in Economics at the University of Manchester in 1910, where he took the degree of MA in 1912.

== Early career ==
Having been judged unfit for military service in the First World War, Woolton became a civil servant, first in the War Office, then at the Leather Control Board, where he served as a civilian boot controller. At the end of the war, he became secretary of the Boot Manufacturers' Federation, joining Lewis's department store in Liverpool, where he was an executive (1928–1951), becoming director in 1928 and chairman in 1936. In 1938, he responded to the Anschluss by announcing that his stores would boycott Nazi German goods. Despite public support, he was reprimanded by Horace Wilson on behalf of Neville Chamberlain's National Government for diverging from its European policy of appeasement.

Woolton was knighted in 1935 and was raised to the peerage in 1939 for his contribution to British industry. Despite his wishes, Garter King of Arms informed him that it was not possible to take the title of Baron Marquis (because "Marquess", or "Marquis", constitutes a rank of British peerages), so he was created Baron Woolton after the Liverpool suburb of Woolton in which he had lived. He subsequently served on several government committees (including the Cadman Committee). He refused to affiliate himself with any political party.

== Second World War ==
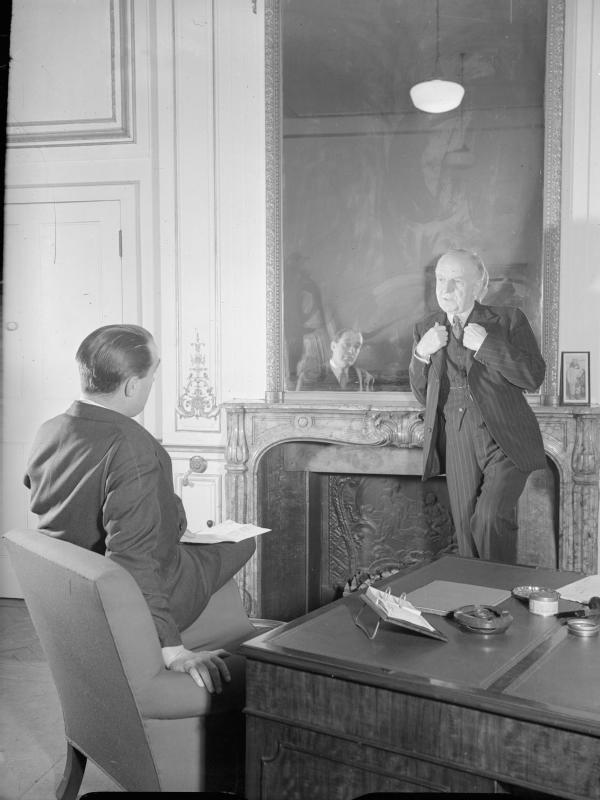
Lord Woolton (right) being interviewed in London in 1944

In April 1940, Woolton was appointed as Minister of Food by Neville Chamberlain, one of several ministerial appointments from outside politics. Woolton retained this position until 1943. He supervised 50,000 employees and over a thousand local offices where people could obtain ration cards. His ministry had a virtual monopoly of all food sold in Britain, whether imported or local. His mission was to guarantee adequate nutrition for everyone. With food supplies cut sharply because of enemy action and the needs of the services, rationing was essential. Woolton and his advisors had one scheme in mind, but economists convinced them to instead try point rationing. Everyone would have a certain number of points a month that they could allocate any way they wanted. The experimental approach to food rationing has been considered successful; indeed, food rationing was a major success story in Britain's war.

In late June 1940, with a German invasion threatened, Woolton reassured the public that emergency food stocks were in place that would last "for weeks and weeks" even if the shipping could not get through. He said "iron rations" were stored for use only in great emergency. Other rations were stored in the outskirts of cities liable to German bombing. When the Blitz began in late summer 1940, he was ready with more than 200 feeding stations in London and other cities under attack.

Woolton had the task of overseeing rationing due to wartime shortages. He took the view that it was insufficient to merely impose restrictions but that a programme of advertising to support it was also required. He warned that meat and cheese, as well as bacon and eggs, were in very short supply and would remain that way. Calling for a simpler diet, he noted that there was plenty of bread, potatoes, vegetable oils, fats, and milk.

By January 1941, the usual overseas food supply had fallen in half. By 1942, however, ample food supplies were arriving through Lend Lease from the U.S. and a similar Canadian programme. Worried about children, he made sure that by 1942 Britain was providing 650,000 children with free school meals; about 3,500,000 children received milk at school, in addition to priority supplies at home. However, his national loaf of wholemeal brown bread replaced the ordinary white variety, to the distaste of most housewives. Children learned that sweets supplies were reduced to save shipping space.

Woolton kept food prices down by subsidizing eggs and other items. He promoted recipes that worked well with the rationing system, including the "Woolton pie," which consisted of carrots, parsnips, potatoes, and turnips in oatmeal, with a pastry or potato crust, and served with brown gravy. Woolton's business skills made the Ministry of Food's job a success, and he earned a strong personal popularity despite the shortages.

Sworn of the Privy Council in 1940, Lord Woolton was appointed a Companion of Honour in 1942. In 1943, Woolton joined the War Cabinet as Minister of Reconstruction, taking charge of the difficult task of planning for post-war Britain and in this role, he appeared on the cover of Time on the issue of 26 March 1945. In May 1945, he was a member of Winston Churchill's "Caretaker" Government as Lord President of the Council.

== Conservative Party Chairman ==
In July 1945, Churchill lost the 1945 general election, and his government fell. The next day, Woolton joined the Conservative Party and was soon appointed party chairman, with the job of improving the party's organisation in the country and revitalising it for future elections. Under Woolton, many sweeping reforms were carried out, and when the Conservatives returned to government in 1951, Woolton served in the Cabinet for the next four years.

Woolton rebuilt the local organisations with an emphasis on membership, money, and a unified national propaganda appeal on critical issues. To broaden the base of potential candidates, the national party provided financial aid to candidates and assisted the local organisations in raising local money. Woolton also proposed changing the name of the party to the Union Party and later emphasised a rhetoric that characterised opponents as "Socialist" rather than "Labour". He was given credit for the Conservative victory in 1951, their first since 1935.

In May 1950, Woolton, with Churchill's approval, called for a form of coalition with the Liberal Party based on nine principles he said they agreed upon:

1. Opposition to "the over-encroaching power of the State over the lives of individuals and of the processes which this commercial nation lives"
2. Opposition to the nationalisation of the means of production, distribution and exchange, "which is the creed of socialism";
3. Opposition to "the centralisation of government in Whitehall and the weakening of the influence of local authorities";
4. Belief in "the establishment, under private enterprise, of partnership in industry, whereby all ranks engaged in it shall … share in the increased yield that comes from greater effort or increased skill";
5. Belief in the maintenance of a high and stable level of employment,
6. Belief that "the best purposes of the State are served when there is economy in public administration and when Government conducted with rigorous avoidance of waste";
7. Belief in high standards of health, housing, and education, coupled with religious freedom;
8. Recognition of the national duty of maintaining sufficient defense forces, of the danger of militant Communism, and of the necessity for close economic and political cooperation with America and Western Europe;
9. "Tolerance, comradeship and unity among all classes."

The Liberal leadership rejected the coalition proposal as one that the Conservatives would control. Labour had recently narrowly won the 1950 general election. The Conservatives without Liberal help won the 1951 general election.

== Lord President of the Council ==
In February 1952 as Lord President of the Council he chaired the Accession Council of Elizabeth II and carried the Sword of State at her Coronation in June 1953.

In the 1953 Coronation Honours, he elevated as Viscount Woolton and, in 1956, he was advanced as Earl of Woolton taking the subsidiary title Viscount Walberton.

== Civic service ==
In November 1945, Woolton gave his inaugural address as President of the Royal Statistical Society.

From 1943 until 1963 he served as Chairman of the Executive Committee of the British Red Cross Society and was appointed a Knight of the Order of St John in 1947.

A Freeman of the City of London, Lord Woolton served as Master of the Worshipful Company of Salters for 1951/52.

== Marriages and children ==
Woolton was married firstly to Maud Smith on 10 October 1912. They had two children:

- Lady Margaret Judith Marquis (21 August 1917 - 4 March 1986)
- Roger David Marquis, 2nd Earl of Woolton (16 July 1922 - 7 January 1969)

The Countess of Woolton died in 1961. Lord Woolton was married secondly to Margaret Eluned Thomas on 19 October 1962. There were no children from this marriage.

== Death ==
Lord Woolton died on 14 December 1964 at his home, Walberton House, Arundel, Sussex at the age of 81. He was succeeded in the earldom and subsidiary titles by his son, Roger.

He is buried at St Mary's Church, Walberton, Sussex.

Woolton Hall at the University of Manchester was named after Lord Woolton, when he was Chancellor of the university, whose arms and coronet appear in architectural details around the hall.

== Arms ==
Coat of arms of Frederick Marquis, 1st Earl of Woolton
Arms of the Earl of Woolton	Coronet A Coronet of an Earl Crest Suspended from and between the Antlers of a stag a Stirrup and Leather proper Escutcheon Sable on a Bend engrailed between two Garbs Or a Rose Gules barbed and seeded proper between two Lions rampant of the field Supporters On either side a Lion rampant Or gorged with a Riband Azure pendent therefrom by a Chain also Or an Escutcheon Azure charged with a Liver Bird Argent Motto Fortitudine Virtute Dabitur (By fortitude and courage it shall be given)

Political offices
Preceded by William Morrison	Minister of Food; 1940–1943	Succeeded by John Llewellin
New office	Minister of Reconstruction; 1943–1945	Office abolished
Preceded by Clement Attlee	Lord President of the Council; 1945	Succeeded by Herbert Morrison
Preceded by The Viscount Addison	Lord President of the Council; 1951–1952	Succeeded by The Marquess of Salisbury
Preceded by The Viscount Swinton	Chancellor of the Duchy of Lancaster; 1952–1955	Succeeded by The Earl of Selkirk
Preceded by Sir Arthur Salter	Minister of Materials; 1953–1954	Office abolished
Party political offices
Preceded by Ralph Assheton	Chairman of the Conservative Party; 1946–1955	Succeeded by Oliver Poole
Peerage of the United Kingdom
New creation	Earl of Woolton; 1956–1964	Succeeded by Roger Marquis
New creation	Viscount Woolton; 1953–1964	Succeeded by Roger Marquis
New creation	Baron Woolton; 1939–1964	Succeeded by Roger Marquis
